= Nyo =

Nyo is a Burmese name. Notable people with this name include:

- Aung Moe Nyo, Burmese politician
- Ba Saw Nyo (1435–1494), Burmese king
- Chit Oo Nyo (born 1947), Burmese writer
- Kale Kye-Taung Nyo, Burmese king
- Khin Nyo
- Min Nyo San
- Mingyi Nyo
- Moe Nyo (born 1973), Burmese painter
- Nyo Min Lu, Burmese writer
- Nyo Min Lwin (born 1979), Burmese film director, scriptwriter and actor
- Nyo Mya, Burmese writer
- Nyo Nyo Thin (born 1967), Burmese lawyer and politician
- Nyo Twan Awng (born 1981)
- Saw Nyo Win, Burmese politician
- Nyo Wai Lwin (born 1995), Burmese CFD broker

== See also ==
- Nyô
- NYO
