= List of villages in Myaungmya Township =

This is a list of villages in Myaungmya Township, Myaungmya District, Ayeyarwady Region, Burma (Myanmar).

Village	Village code	Village tract	Coordinates (links to map & photo sources)	Notes
Ah Htet Nyaung War Kwin	150647	Ba Maw Kun Thee Pin		
Ah Htet Poe Laung	217431	Poe Laung		
Ah Htet Su	163645	Yin Ngan	16.4757°N 94.8897°E	
Ah Lel Su	161191	Taung Dee	16.5208°N 94.852°E	
Ah Nauk Kone	217444	Ta Pin Chaung		
Ah Nauk Let Pan	155134	Kyar Hpu Ngon	16.6239°N 94.9715°E	
Ah Nauk Su	156472	Kywet Nwe Chaung	16.4872°N 94.9077°E	
Ah Nyar Kone	150953	Bu Din Kwin	16.354°N 94.7404°E	
Ah Nyar Kone	157544	Mee Thway Chaung	16.5754°N 95.0237°E	
Ah Nyar Kone	161055	Ta Pin Chaung		
Ah Nyar Su (North)	151323	Da Yei Pauk		
Ah Nyar Su (South)	151317	Da Yei Pauk	16.4689°N 94.9724°E	
Ah Pyin Lay Bet Twar	150240	Ah Pyin Lay Bet Twar	16.5888°N 94.7921°E	
Ah Pyin Pat Lan	152268	Hpa Yar Chaung		
Ah Shey Kone	154769	Kwei Lwei		
Ah Shey Let Pan	153370	Ka Nyin Ge	16.6189°N 94.9694°E	
Ah Su Gyi	152212	Hnget Pyaw Taw	16.5258°N 94.9625°E	
Ah Su GYi	152288	Hpa Yar Chaung Ah Su Gyi	16.5445°N 95.0556°E	
Ah Su Gyi	150324	Ah Su Gyi	16.7355°N 94.9659°E	
Ah Twin Lay Bet Twar	150346	Ah Twin Lay Bet Twar	16.5562°N 94.7824°E	
Ah Twin Pat Lan	152269	Hpa Yar Chaung		
Auk Nyaung War Kwin	150648	Ba Maw Kun Thee Pin		
Auk Poe Laung	217432	Poe Laung		
Aung Chan Mya	157005	Lu Taw		
Aung Thu Kha	152267	Hpa Yar Chaung		
Aung Zay Ya	157756	Moke Soe Kwin		
Aye Ywar	152594	Htan Kone	16.4375°N 94.9025°E	
Aye Ywar	153913	Kan Kwin	16.4316°N 94.9179°E	
Ba Maw	153989	Kan Thar Kone	16.6086°N 94.8947°E	
Ba Maw Kun Thee Pin	150644	Ba Maw Kun Thee Pin		
Ba Maw Thein (South)	161843	Tha Yaw Kwayt	16.4379°N 95.0153°E	
Ba Maw Thone Gwa	150649	Ba Maw Thone Gwa	16.6403°N 94.9087°E	
Ban Maw Su	154641	Kun Chan		
Bar Aing	158749	Ohn Pin	16.4829°N 94.9535°E	
Be Sa Pat Kone	153365	Ka Nyin Ge	16.6202°N 94.9799°E	
Bi Lu Chaung	217438	Ka Nyin Kone		
Boe Hteik Chaung	160689	Sit Kwin Kun Chan		
Boe Khaung Chaung	162911	U Nu Chaung	16.5339°N 94.9887°E	
Boe Kyar Kone	161206	Taung Ka Lay	16.5795°N 94.8177°E	
Boe Pyar Chaung	158332	Ngar Yar Bo	16.4108°N 94.9985°E	
Bone Kyaw Su	155270	Kyat Khoe Su	16.4964°N 95.0361°E	
Bone Soe Chaung	158333	Ngar Yar Bo	16.4158°N 95.0014°E	
Bu Chaung	151588	Ein Ta Lone	16.4672°N 94.9185°E	
Bu Din Kwin	150945	Bu Din Kwin	16.3631°N 94.7298°E	
Byaing Hpyu	153986	Kan Thar Kone	16.6597°N 94.8667°E	
Chan Thar Kone	163131	Wea Ka Lay	16.6122°N 94.8331°E	
Chan Thar Kone	159716	Sa Ka Myar	16.5515°N 95.0359°E	
Chauk Ein Tan	160538	Sin Ku Kone Hteik Pyaung		
Chaung Bye Gyi	217448	Lin Daing Let Pan	16.4962°N 95.0229°E	
Chaung Byea Gyi	156203	Kyun Deik	16.5021°N 95.0228°E	
Chaung Ka Lay	156053	Kyon Thut	16.7022°N 94.897°E	
Chaung Kwe Gyi	151158	Chaung Kwe Gyi	16.3804°N 95.0029°E	
Chaung Pauk	157545	Mee Thway Chaung		
Chaung Phyar	217423	Kyon War		
Chaung Wa	152292	Hpa Yar Chaung Ah Su Gyi		
Chaung Wa Su	161902	Tha Yet Kone		
Chin Kone	217415	Kone Thar		
Chit Tee Kone	150245	Ah Pyin Lay Bet Twar		
Da Gon May	157010	Lu Taw		
Da Ni Hpo	153915	Kan Kwin	16.4162°N 94.9182°E	
Da None Chaung	151281	Da None Chaung	16.6464°N 94.9821°E	
Da None Chaung	156957	Lin Daing Kan Ba Lar	16.5301°N 95.011°E	
Da None Chaung	156248	Kyun Ka Lay	16.4962°N 94.9868°E	
Da None Chaung	151418	Daunt Gyi	16.5314°N 95.0137°E	
Da Yei Pauk	151316	Da Yei Pauk	16.4847°N 94.9695°E	
Dar Mya Chaung	151358	Dar Mya Chaung	16.4756°N 95.0078°E	
Daunt Gyi	217443	Thone Gwa Kun Chan		
Daunt Gyi	151416	Daunt Gyi	16.5302°N 95.0213°E	
Doe Pat	151318	Da Yei Pauk	16.4604°N 94.9683°E	
Ein Ta Lone	151586	Ein Ta Lone	16.4644°N 94.91°E	
Ga Yet Gyi	154411	Khway Lay Gyi	16.5359°N 94.7847°E	
Gant Gaw Kone	157757	Moke Soe Kwin		
Gant Gaw Kone	152863	Htone Bo Mi Chaung Aing	16.3898°N 94.8495°E	
Gant Gaw Kone Ywar Thit	157767	Moke Soe Kwin		
Gant Gaw Su	153376	Ka Nyin Kaing	16.4049°N 94.8368°E	
Gon Nyin Tan	156047	Kyon Thut	16.7244°N 94.9147°E	
Gway Pin Kya	163780	Ywar Thar Gyi	16.5561°N 95.0673°E	
Gway Pin Seik	159531	Pyin	16.4994°N 94.9563°E	
Gyaung Shey	153914	Kan Kwin		
Gyone Gyone Kya Shan Su	152263	Hpa Yar Chaung	16.5788°N 94.928°E	
Hlay Yon	160686	Sit Kwin Kun Chan	16.6013°N 95.0694°E	
Hle Seik	153833	Kan Chaung (Tha Yaw Bone)	16.5853°N 94.9854°E	
Hle Seik	154410	Khway Lay Gyi	16.5224°N 94.797°E	
Hle Seik	217437	Ka Nyin Kone		
Hnget Pyaw Taw	152211	Hnget Pyaw Taw	16.5221°N 94.9618°E	
Hpa Lauk Chaung	151360	Dar Mya Chaung	16.4852°N 95.0119°E	
Hpa Lauk Chaung	217447	Lin Daing Let Pan		
Hpa Yar Chaung	152258	Hpa Yar Chaung		
Hpa Yar Chaung	152290	Hpa Yar Chaung Ah Su Gyi		
Hpa Yar Gyi Kone	163644	Yin Ngan	16.4897°N 94.902°E	
Hpa Yar Kone	163583	Yan Ma Naing	16.461°N 95.0643°E	
Hpa Yar Ngoke To	158331	Ngar Yar Bo	16.4329°N 94.9992°E	
Hpa Yar Ngoke To Shan Su	160210	Shan Su		
Hpyar Pon Su	151319	Da Yei Pauk	16.4536°N 94.9672°E	
Htan Kone	152593	Htan Kone	16.4521°N 94.9007°E	
Htan Pin Chaung	153822	Kan Chaung		
Htan Pin Kone	163127	Wea Ka Lay	16.6056°N 94.849°E	
Htan Pin Kone	156018	Kyon Tar Moke Soe Ma	16.5089°N 95.0649°E	
Htaung Kone	157758	Moke Soe Kwin		
Htaw Ka Loet	152707	Htaw Ka Loet	16.5951°N 95.0131°E	
Htaw Ka Loet Chaung Hpyar	152711	Htaw Ka Loet	16.5866°N 95.0033°E	
Htaw Ka Loet Set Su	152709	Htaw Ka Loet		
Htaw Meit	152860	Htone Bo (Byaing Hpyu)	16.6234°N 94.8416°E	
Htein Pin Kyet shar	153912	Kan Kwin	16.4317°N 94.9445°E	
Htein Pin Su	156051	Kyon Thut	16.7097°N 94.9217°E	
Htin Pon Su	156962	Lin Daing Let Pan	16.4992°N 94.9962°E	
Htone Bo (Byaing Hpyu)	152857	Htone Bo (Byaing Hpyu)	16.6387°N 94.8333°E	
Htone Bo Mi Chaung Aing	152861	Htone Bo Mi Chaung Aing	16.3954°N 94.8631°E	
Inn Ga Tay	158748	Ohn Pin	16.4532°N 94.9533°E	
Ka Chaung	153987	Kan Thar Kone	16.6231°N 94.8698°E	
Ka Det Kwin	153189	Ka Det Kwin	16.469°N 94.9286°E	
Ka Ma Kaing	153279	Ka Ma Kaing		
Ka Nyin Chaung	153343	Ka Nyin Chaung	16.5006°N 94.9041°E	
Ka Nyin Chaung Hpyar	153377	Ka Nyin Kaing	16.4077°N 94.8413°E	
Ka Nyin Chaung Hpyar (East)	153344	Ka Nyin Chaung	16.504°N 94.8977°E	
Ka Nyin Chaung Hpyar (West)	153350	Ka Nyin Chaung	16.4891°N 94.9064°E	
Ka Nyin Chaung Pa Law Nan Mu	150952	Bu Din Kwin	16.3739°N 94.7189°E	
Ka Nyin Ge	153364	Ka Nyin Ge	16.6123°N 94.9588°E	
Ka Nyin Kaing	153375	Ka Nyin Kaing	16.4179°N 94.8447°E	
Ka Nyin Kone	153412	Ka Nyin Kone		
Ka Nyin Kone (North)	157011	Lu Taw	16.3923°N 95.0073°E	
Ka Nyin Kone (South)	157006	Lu Taw	16.385°N 95.0012°E	
Ka Nyin Kwin	157784	Mway Taw Shan Su	16.657°N 94.92°E	
Ka Nyut Kwin	153566	Ka Nyut Kwin	16.5967°N 94.8742°E	
Ka Thit Kone	157764	Moke Soe Kwin		
Ka Wet	153659	Ka Wet	16.5435°N 95.0243°E	
Ka Wet Chaung Hpyar	160861	Ta Khun Taing	16.5624°N 95.0057°E	
Kan	162876	Tu Chaung Kyaung Su	16.496°N 94.9457°E	
Kan Ba Lar	156958	Lin Daing Kan Ba Lar	16.5145°N 95.0102°E	
Kan Ba Lar	161899	Tha Yet Kone	16.5041°N 94.9955°E	
Kan Beit Ka Lay	153781	Kan Beit Ka Lay		
Kan Beit Lay	163781	Ywar Thar Gyi		
Kan Chaung	153830	Kan Chaung (Tha Yaw Bone)	16.5954°N 94.9838°E	
Kan Chaung	153821	Kan Chaung	16.7057°N 94.9698°E	
Kan Gyi	153834	Kan Gyi	16.7331°N 95.0313°E	
Kan Kone	154764	Kwei Lwei	16.611°N 94.9472°E	
Kan Kone	217419	Hnget Pyaw Taw		
Kan Kone	163130	Wea Ka Lay	16.6199°N 94.8529°E	
Kan Kwin	217417	Kan Chaung (Tha Yaw Bone)		
Kan Kwin	152708	Htaw Ka Loet		
Kan Kwin	153911	Kan Kwin	16.4017°N 94.9241°E	
Kan Kwin	159461	Put Kha Yaing	16.4229°N 95.0074°E	
Kan Ni	162414	Thein Lar Gat Su	16.4482°N 94.8153°E	
Kan Nyi Naung	217439	Kywe Chan Pay Kone		
Kan Su	159639	Pyin Ma Kwin		
Kan Su	154951	Kwin Pauk Ka Lay		
Kan Su	159458	Put Kha Yaing	16.4122°N 95.0226°E	
Kan Thar Kone	153984	Kan Thar Kone	16.6038°N 94.8842°E	
Kan Thar Kone	159637	Pyin Ma Kwin		
Kan Thit	217434	Ba Maw Thone Gwa		
Kayin su	153836	Kan Gyi		
Khar Pyat	158335	Ngar Yar Bo	16.399°N 95.0062°E	
Khar Pyat	159462	Put Kha Yaing	16.4009°N 95.0057°E	
Khun Hnit Ein Tan	151322	Da Yei Pauk		
Khway Lay Gyi	154406	Khway Lay Gyi	16.52°N 94.8089°E	
Khway Lay Wa	154421	Khway Lay Gyi	16.528°N 94.7908°E	
Khway Maung Chaung	153823	Kan Chaung	16.686°N 94.9744°E	
Koke Ko Su	154418	Khway Lay Gyi	16.5396°N 94.8275°E	
Kone Gyi	150244	Ah Pyin Lay Bet Twar	16.562°N 94.7955°E	
Kone Hteik Pyaung	160535	Sin Ku Kone Hteik Pyaung	16.5026°N 94.8618°E	
Kone Ka Lay	153990	Kan Thar Kone	16.6088°N 94.8858°E	
Kone Kyat Pyaung	156017	Kyon Tar Moke Soe Ma	16.5212°N 95.0646°E	
Kone Su	158249	Nga Myin Chaung		
Kone Thar	154551	Kone Thar	16.5328°N 94.9096°E	
Ku	156551	La Put Ku Lar		
Ku Lar Kone	152262	Hpa Yar Chaung	16.5892°N 94.9455°E	
Ku Lar Kone	153824	Kan Chaung		
Ku Lar Ma Kwin	217436	Ohn Pin		
Ku Lar Su	153839	Kan Gyi	16.7312°N 95.0444°E	
Kun Chan	154766	Kwei Lwei	16.6022°N 94.9404°E	
Kun Chan	152259	Hpa Yar Chaung	16.5987°N 94.9405°E	
Kun Chan	160688	Sit Kwin Kun Chan	16.58°N 95.0527°E	
Kun Chan (West)	162737	Thone Gwa Kun Chan	16.5367°N 94.9781°E	
Kun Chan Chaung Da None	156202	Kyun Deik		
Kun Chan Gyi	154640	Kun Chan		
Kun Chan Hpyar	153413	Ka Nyin Kone	16.4613°N 94.8719°E	
Kun Chan Kone	161901	Tha Yet Kone		
Kun Chan Kone	157009	Lu Taw	16.4004°N 94.9711°E	
Kun Thee Chaung	160537	Sin Ku Kone Hteik Pyaung		
Kun Thee Chaung	158622	Nyaung Taw Su		
Kun Thee Chaung	158300	Nga Tan Ta Yar	16.495°N 95.0245°E	
Kun Thee Pin Seik	154415	Khway Lay Gyi	16.545°N 94.8373°E	
Kun Thee Taw	217446	Sit Kwin Kun Chan		
Kwei Lwei	154763	Kwei Lwei	16.6077°N 94.9386°E	
Kwet Pyin	153835	Kan Gyi	16.7264°N 94.9942°E	
Kwin Gyi	161209	Taung Ka Lay		
Kwin Ka Lay	152858	Htone Bo (Byaing Hpyu)	16.6317°N 94.8217°E	
Kwin Ka Lay	158246	Nga Myin Chaung	16.5456°N 94.768°E	
Kwin Pauk	153985	Kan Thar Kone	16.641°N 94.8612°E	
Kwin Pauk Gyi	154949	Kwin Pauk Gyi	16.532°N 95.0326°E	
Kwin Pauk Ka Lay	154950	Kwin Pauk Ka Lay	16.4614°N 94.9777°E	
Kyar Beik	153838	Kan Gyi		
Kyar Chaung	153785	Kan Beit Ka Lay	16.4872°N 95.0503°E	
Kyar Hpu Ngon	155131	Kyar Hpu Ngon	16.6266°N 94.9634°E	
Kyar Kwin	160684	Sit Kwin Kun Chan	16.5919°N 95.0493°E	
Kyar Kwin (East)	155228	Kyar Kwin	16.5893°N 95.0571°E	
Kyar Kwin (Middle)	155227	Kyar Kwin		
Kyar Kwin (West)	155229	Kyar Kwin	16.584°N 95.0738°E	
Kyar Ni Kwin	154952	Kwin Pauk Ka Lay	16.4415°N 95.0056°E	
Kyar Taw Kwin	151284	Da None Chaung		
Kyat Khoe Su	155265	Kyat Khoe Su	16.4775°N 95.031°E	
Kyauk Aing	150652	Ba Maw Thone Gwa	16.6165°N 94.8957°E	
Kyauk Ka Bar	150951	Bu Din Kwin	16.3533°N 94.7683°E	
Kyauk Khe Chaung	163776	Ywar Thar Gyi	16.5747°N 95.0832°E	
Kyauk Myet Su	159718	Sa Ka Myar	16.5586°N 95.0533°E	
Kyauk Sa Yit Kone	163129	Wea Ka Lay	16.6084°N 94.8323°E	
Kyaung Su	156106	Kyon War	16.666°N 94.9369°E	
Kyaung Su	217429	Pyin Pon	16.4676°N 94.7859°E	
Kyaung Su	162878	Tu Chaung Kyaung Su	16.5092°N 94.9399°E	
Kyaung Su (Ah Lel Su)	153784	Kan Beit Ka Lay		
Kyaung Thit	157004	Lu Taw	16.3594°N 94.9719°E	
Kyay Thar Taung	153346	Ka Nyin Chaung	16.4987°N 94.8905°E	
Kyet Yoe Chaung	153281	Ka Ma Kaing	16.3822°N 94.8022°E	
Kyi Su	161842	Tha Yaw Kwayt	16.4586°N 95.0383°E	
Kyon Kha Yin	161900	Tha Yet Kone	16.5131°N 94.9855°E	
Kyon Tar Hpa Yar Su	156019	Kyon Tar Moke Soe Ma	16.5152°N 95.052°E	
Kyon Tar Wa	156021	Kyon Tar Moke Soe Ma	16.5056°N 95.059°E	
Kyon Thut	156045	Kyon Thut	16.7048°N 94.915°E	
Kyon Thwei Wa	157046	Ma Dawt Pin		
Kyon Tone Kyun Ka Lay	153369	Ka Nyin Ge	16.5986°N 94.9507°E	
Kyon Tone Wa	153368	Ka Nyin Ge	16.6029°N 94.9519°E	
Kyon War	156105	Kyon War	16.6614°N 94.9605°E	
Kyu Taw Kwin	158336	Ngar Yar Bo	16.4244°N 95.0194°E	
Kyun Deik	156200	Kyun Deik	16.5134°N 95.031°E	
Kyun Ka Lay	156247	Kyun Ka Lay	16.4944°N 94.9791°E	
Kyun Kyar Gyi	153782	Kan Beit Ka Lay	16.4708°N 95.0746°E	
Kyun Taw	152270	Hpa Yar Chaung		
Kyun Taw Ah Shey Kone	152272	Hpa Yar Chaung		
Kyun Taw Ta Dar Gyi	152260	Hpa Yar Chaung		
Kywe Chan	161066	Ta Zin Kone Gyi	16.5446°N 94.9453°E	
Kywe Chan	156352	Kywe Chan Pay Kone	16.4036°N 94.9594°E	
Kywe Chan Wa	153414	Ka Nyin Kone	16.4414°N 94.8721°E	
Kywe Ku	162875	Tu Chaung Kyaung Su		
Kywet Nwe Chaung	156468	Kywet Nwe Chaung	16.4881°N 94.9143°E	
La Put Ku Lar	156548	La Put Ku Lar	16.5115°N 94.98°E	
Lay Ein Su	156550	La Put Ku Lar	16.504°N 94.9662°E	
Lay Ein Tan	156638	Lay Ein Tan	16.7002°N 94.9389°E	
Lay Gyi	158297	Nga Tan Ta Yar	16.4881°N 95.019°E	
Lay Gyi Kyein Kyon	155266	Kyat Khoe Su		
Leik Ka Bar	156016	Kyon Tar Moke Soe Ma	16.5154°N 95.0709°E	
Let Khoke	217416	Kan Gyi	16.7326°N 95.0331°E	
Let Khoke	156046	Kyon Thut	16.7312°N 94.9274°E	
Let Pan	155132	Kyar Hpu Ngon		
Let Pan Chaung	156960	Lin Daing Let Pan	16.492°N 95.0104°E	
Lin Daing	161204	Taung Ka Lay	16.5783°N 94.8562°E	
Lin Daing	161064	Ta Zin Kone Gyi	16.5599°N 94.9536°E	
Lin Daing	156956	Lin Daing Kan Ba Lar	16.5219°N 95.0129°E	
Lin Daing	151417	Daunt Gyi	16.5221°N 95.0101°E	
Lin Daing Lay	154416	Khway Lay Gyi		
Lin Sin Gyi	157443	Me Kyaw	16.4582°N 94.7289°E	
Lu Taw Gyi	157003	Lu Taw	16.3947°N 94.9671°E	
Lu Taw Ka Lay	157007	Lu Taw	16.3846°N 94.9665°E	
Ma Da Ma Yae Kyaw	161062	Ta Zin Kone Gyi	16.5709°N 94.9677°E	
Ma Dawt Chaung	158433	Nyaung Chaung Pway Su	16.5381°N 95.0803°E	
Ma Dawt Kone	152596	Htan Kone	16.4536°N 94.8814°E	
Ma Dawt Pin	157044	Ma Dawt Pin	16.6726°N 95.0058°E	
Ma Gu Chaung	163584	Yan Ma Naing	16.4646°N 95.0452°E	
Ma Gyi Chaung	153831	Kan Chaung (Tha Yaw Bone)	16.5812°N 94.9882°E	
Ma Gyi Chaung	156052	Kyon Thut		
Ma Gyi Kone	163647	Yin Ngan	16.4831°N 94.8981°E	
Ma May Taung Ka Lay	161068	Ta Zin Kone Gyi	16.5664°N 94.9399°E	
Ma Yan Chaung	153366	Ka Nyin Ge	16.6056°N 94.9814°E	
Ma Yan Chaung	157763	Moke Soe Kwin	16.5953°N 94.912°E	
Ma Yan Chaung	150651	Ba Maw Thone Gwa	16.6328°N 94.9056°E	
Ma Yan Kone Ywar Ma	157754	Moke Soe Kwin		
Ma Yan Kone Ywar Thit	157755	Moke Soe Kwin		
Me Kyaw	157440	Me Kyaw	16.4408°N 94.722°E	
Me Za Li San	153570	Ka Nyut Kwin	16.5779°N 94.888°E	
Mee Gu	157446	Me Kyaw	16.4347°N 94.7382°E	
Mee Thway Chaung	157541	Mee Thway Chaung	16.5868°N 95.0232°E	
Mi Chaung Ta Yar	151159	Chaung Kwe Gyi	16.3923°N 95.02°E	
Moe Kyoe Pan	217430	Pyin Pon		
Moke Soe Kwin	157752	Moke Soe Kwin	16.5715°N 94.8994°E	
Moke Soe Ma	156015	Kyon Tar Moke Soe Ma	16.5001°N 95.0375°E	
Mway Taw Shan Su	157780	Mway Taw Shan Su	16.6602°N 94.9277°E	
Mya Sein Yaung	153345	Ka Nyin Chaung	16.5163°N 94.8861°E	
Myay Ni Kone	153660	Ka Wet	16.5485°N 95.026°E	
Myay Ta Dar	160211	Shan Su		
Myin Ka Chaung	156641	Lay Ein Tan	16.6981°N 94.9518°E	
Myin Ka Kwin	157885	Myin Ka Kwin	16.3637°N 94.8009°E	
Myit Kyoe	161844	Tha Yaw Kwayt	16.4314°N 95.0321°E	
Myit Kyoe Gyi	159459	Put Kha Yaing	16.4293°N 95.0323°E	
Myit Kyoe Lay	159460	Put Kha Yaing	16.4176°N 95.0314°E	
Myo Haung	154557	Kone Thar	16.5112°N 94.9069°E	
Nar Nat Taung	153282	Ka Ma Kaing	16.3969°N 94.7869°E	
Nat Sin Chaung	151359	Dar Mya Chaung	16.4538°N 95.0119°E	
Nat Sin Chaung (Auk Su)	161841	Tha Yaw Kwayt	16.4514°N 95.0113°E	
Nat Ywar U Yin Su	153191	Ka Det Kwin	16.471°N 94.9226°E	
Naung Sa Khan	157442	Me Kyaw	16.4227°N 94.7309°E	
Neik Ban Chaung	163582	Yan Ma Naing	16.4573°N 95.0507°E	
Nga Myin Chaung	158245	Nga Myin Chaung	16.5338°N 94.7392°E	
Nga Myin Chaung	156470	Kywet Nwe Chaung	16.5165°N 94.9215°E	
Nga Myin Chaung	151362	Dar Mya Chaung	16.4683°N 95.0059°E	
Nga Tan Ta Yar	158296	Nga Tan Ta Yar	16.4658°N 95.008°E	
Ngar Yar Bo	158330	Ngar Yar Bo	16.4212°N 95.01°E	
Ngar Ywar Su	156471	Kywet Nwe Chaung		
Ngu Aing	163775	Ywar Thar Gyi	16.579°N 95.0871°E	
Ngu Chaung	150646	Ba Maw Kun Thee Pin		
None Chaung	156249	Kyun Ka Lay		
Nyaung Chaung	158248	Nga Myin Chaung	16.5177°N 94.7386°E	
Nyaung Chaung	157045	Ma Dawt Pin	16.6481°N 95.0027°E	
Nyaung Chaung	156639	Lay Ein Tan	16.6955°N 94.9532°E	
Nyaung Chaung	156959	Lin Daing Kan Ba Lar	16.5398°N 95.0079°E	
Nyaung Chaung	158434	Nyaung Chaung Pway Su	16.5329°N 95.0654°E	
Nyaung Chay Htauk	217428	Taung Dee		
Nyaung Kone	152266	Hpa Yar Chaung	16.5854°N 94.9447°E	
Nyaung Kone	161067	Ta Zin Kone Gyi	16.5831°N 94.9488°E	
Nyaung Lay Pin	157769	Moke Soe Kwin		
Nyaung Pin Gyi	153348	Ka Nyin Chaung	16.4922°N 94.889°E	
Nyaung Pin Thar	151587	Ein Ta Lone	16.4564°N 94.9084°E	
Nyaung Taw Su	158619	Nyaung Taw Su	16.5439°N 94.9637°E	
Nyaung Taw Su	158298	Nga Tan Ta Yar	16.4721°N 95.0029°E	
Nyaung Waing	156050	Kyon Thut	16.7126°N 94.9056°E	
Nyaung Waing	156549	La Put Ku Lar	16.5222°N 94.9764°E	
Ohn Pin	158747	Ohn Pin	16.4384°N 94.9481°E	
Ohn Pin Su	151282	Da None Chaung	16.6354°N 94.9775°E	
Ohn Pin Su	158620	Nyaung Taw Su	16.558°N 94.9689°E	
Ohn Pin Su Gyi	157781	Mway Taw Shan Su	16.6688°N 94.9353°E	
Ohn Pin Su Lay	157782	Mway Taw Shan Su		
Oke Kyin	157766	Moke Soe Kwin		
Pa Keik	158920	Pa Keik	16.407°N 94.9645°E	
Pan Hpyu Kwe	158334	Ngar Yar Bo	16.4046°N 95.0004°E	
Pan Hpyu Ywar Thit	151160	Chaung Kwe Gyi		
Par Sa Kei Kone	157761	Moke Soe Kwin		
Pauk Taw Su	155133	Kyar Hpu Ngon	16.6157°N 94.9631°E	
Pauk Tein	161420	Tei Chaung	16.695°N 94.9232°E	
Pauk Tein	156054	Kyon Thut		
Paw Taw Mu	160683	Sit Kwin Kun Chan	16.5683°N 95.0522°E	
Pay Kone	156351	Kywe Chan Pay Kone	16.4352°N 94.9669°E	
Pay Pin	153192	Ka Det Kwin	16.4736°N 94.938°E	
Pay Pin Chon	154642	Kun Chan		
Pay Tha Lar Kone	161069	Ta Zin Kone Gyi	16.5507°N 94.9196°E	
Pay Tha Lat	217414	Kone Thar		
Pein Hne Chaung	153347	Ka Nyin Chaung		
Pein Hne Chaung	161054	Ta Pin Chaung	16.5584°N 95.0189°E	
Pein Hne Kone	161205	Taung Ka Lay	16.5926°N 94.8407°E	
Pi Tauk Kone	155268	Kyat Khoe Su		
Pi Tauk Kone Kan Nyi Naung	155269	Kyat Khoe Su		
Poe Laung (Nyaung Chaung Lay)	159426	Poe Laung	16.5121°N 94.7313°E	
Poe Laung Wa	150954	Bu Din Kwin	16.4103°N 94.7267°E	
Pu La Mu Yae Kyaw	154953	Kwin Pauk Ka Lay	16.4714°N 94.9931°E	
Pu Lu	152710	Htaw Ka Loet	16.6036°N 95.0083°E	
Put Kha Yaing	159457	Put Kha Yaing	16.4053°N 95.0216°E	
Pway Su	158432	Nyaung Chaung Pway Su	16.525°N 95.0764°E	
Pwe Hnyet San	154556	Kone Thar	16.5325°N 94.8907°E	
Pwe Hnyet San	153349	Ka Nyin Chaung	16.5305°N 94.8896°E	
Pyapon Su	154408	Khway Lay Gyi		
Pyin	159530	Pyin	16.4894°N 94.9679°E	
Pyin Ka Doe Kone	153571	Ka Nyut Kwin	16.588°N 94.8721°E	
Pyin Ka Doe Kone	150243	Ah Pyin Lay Bet Twar	16.5633°N 94.7825°E	
Pyin Ka Doe Taung	152862	Htone Bo Mi Chaung Aing	16.4177°N 94.8684°E	
Pyin Ma Chaung	156642	Lay Ein Tan	16.6939°N 94.9416°E	
Pyin Ma Kwin	217433	Pyin Ma Kwin		
Pyin Pon	159665	Pyin Pon	16.4579°N 94.7731°E	
Rakhine Kone	150949	Bu Din Kwin	16.3556°N 94.7319°E	
Sa Ka Myar	159715	Sa Ka Myar	16.5621°N 95.0496°E	
Sa Kawt Paw	150347	Ah Twin Lay Bet Twar	16.5567°N 94.8085°E	
Sa Khan Gyi	157542	Mee Thway Chaung	16.5772°N 95.0282°E	
Sa Lu Chaung	153568	Ka Nyut Kwin	16.5886°N 94.8799°E	
Saik Pyo Chin	157753	Moke Soe Kwin		
San Chauk Gyi	152264	Hpa Yar Chaung	16.5814°N 94.946°E	
San Chauk Ku Lar Kone	152265	Hpa Yar Chaung		
San Chaung Ka Lay	152271	Hpa Yar Chaung		
San Chaung Lay	159427	Poe Laung	16.4738°N 94.7229°E	
San Pya	217445	Sit Kwin Kun Chan		
Sar Hpyu Kone	217474	Nga Myin Chaung		
Sar Hpyu Su	162912	U Nu Chaung		
Sar Kyet Su	154558	Kone Thar		
Sar Ma Lauk	152291	Hpa Yar Chaung Ah Su Gyi		
Sar Ma Lauk	156049	Kyon Thut	16.7387°N 94.9359°E	
Saung Pon	162413	Thein Lar Gat Su	16.4583°N 94.8277°E	
Saw Taw Kone	153832	Kan Chaung (Tha Yaw Bone)	16.5821°N 94.9988°E	
Saw Taw Kone	217441	Mee Thway Chaung		
Set Kaw	154765	Kwei Lwei	16.6051°N 94.9489°E	
Set Kone	152213	Hnget Pyaw Taw	16.5341°N 94.9511°E	
Set Kone	163643	Yin Ngan	16.4729°N 94.9067°E	
Set Kone	151321	Da Yei Pauk	16.4616°N 94.9732°E	
Set Kone Lay	159638	Pyin Ma Kwin		
Shan Chaung	152289	Hpa Yar Chaung Ah Su Gyi		
Shan Chaung Ywar Ma	156353	Kywe Chan Pay Kone	16.3848°N 94.9566°E	
Shan Kwin	217425	Mway Taw Shan Su		
Shan Su	156552	La Put Ku Lar		
Shan Yae Kyaw	160225	Shan Yae Kyaw	16.4135°N 94.8899°E	
Shit Ein Tan	154413	Khway Lay Gyi	16.5027°N 94.7929°E	
Shwe Dar Kone	157759	Moke Soe Kwin		
Shwe Lun Kone	152859	Htone Bo (Byaing Hpyu)	16.6159°N 94.8363°E	
Shwe Yat Taung Kone	150242	Ah Pyin Lay Bet Twar	16.5692°N 94.814°E	
Sin Gyi Lel Pin	154414	Khway Lay Gyi	16.527°N 94.8105°E	
Sin Ku	160536	Sin Ku Kone Hteik Pyaung	16.5027°N 94.8739°E	
Sin Ku Lay	153569	Ka Nyut Kwin		
Sin Kwin Ywar Haung	160543	Sin Kwin		
Sin Kwin Ywar Thit	160544	Sin Kwin	16.4042°N 94.9095°E	
Sit Kwin	160682	Sit Kwin Kun Chan	16.6°N 95.0727°E	
Sit Su	217421	Tha Yaw Bone		
Sit Ta Lin	157762	Moke Soe Kwin		
Sit Ta Pin	151283	Da None Chaung	16.6452°N 94.9633°E	
Ta Dar Gyi	154553	Kone Thar	16.5397°N 94.9118°E	
Ta Dar Gyi (East)	161065	Ta Zin Kone Gyi		
Ta Dar Ku	157783	Mway Taw Shan Su	16.6414°N 94.9336°E	
Ta Khun Taing	153280	Ka Ma Kaing	16.4293°N 94.8256°E	
Ta Khun Taing	160859	Ta Khun Taing	16.5718°N 95.0042°E	
Ta Loke Su	156643	Lay Ein Tan	16.7074°N 94.9338°E	
Ta Pin Chaung	154554	Kone Thar	16.5333°N 94.9021°E	
Ta Pin Chaung	161053	Ta Pin Chaung	16.5588°N 95.0281°E	
Ta Say Ngu	163581	Yan Ma Naing		
Ta Yoke Su	161419	Tei Chaung	16.659°N 94.9213°E	
Ta Zin Kone Gyi	161060	Ta Zin Kone Gyi	16.5762°N 94.9476°E	
Ta Zin Kone Lay	161061	Ta Zin Kone Gyi	16.5699°N 94.9424°E	
Taung Dee	161190	Taung Dee	16.512°N 94.8466°E	
Taung Ka Bar	217426	Sin Ku Kone Hteik Pyaung		
Taung Ka Lay	161202	Taung Ka Lay	16.5883°N 94.8474°E	
Taung Ka Lay	152864	Htone Bo Mi Chaung Aing	16.4132°N 94.8603°E	
Taung Ka Tan	160540	Sin Ku Kone Hteik Pyaung		
Taung Khwe	154552	Kone Thar	16.5443°N 94.9167°E	
Taung Kone	163646	Yin Ngan	16.4851°N 94.8699°E	
Taung Paw Su	153416	Ka Nyin Kone	16.4548°N 94.8596°E	
Taung Poet Ta Yar	152595	Htan Kone	16.4492°N 94.9089°E	
Taung Pu Sar	217435	Yin Ngan		
Taung Taw	217442	Tha Yet Kone		
Taung Tha Le Kone	160539	Sin Ku Kone Hteik Pyaung	16.5176°N 94.8564°E	
Taung Thar Yar	154559	Kone Thar	16.543°N 94.8912°E	
Taung Thone Lone	157441	Me Kyaw	16.4374°N 94.7443°E	
Taw Hla	160541	Sin Ku Kone Hteik Pyaung		
Taw Yi	153837	Kan Gyi	16.7263°N 94.9902°E	
Tei Chaung	161418	Tei Chaung	16.6718°N 94.9265°E	
Teit Teit Ku	161449	Teit Teit Ku	16.5453°N 94.9347°E	
Teit Teit Ku	150947	Bu Din Kwin	16.3985°N 94.7251°E	
Tha Bawt Chaung	161450	Teit Teit Ku	16.5354°N 94.9317°E	
Tha Hmeit Chaung	161421	Tei Chaung	16.6761°N 94.9149°E	
Tha Khut Kwin	161451	Teit Teit Ku	16.5209°N 94.9391°E	
Tha Man Chaung	161845	Tha Yaw Kwayt		
Tha Min Chan	161694	Tha Pyay Chaung	16.6877°N 95.0017°E	
Tha Min Thay	163128	Wea Ka Lay	16.6165°N 94.8599°E	
Tha Pyay Chaung	156640	Lay Ein Tan	16.7016°N 94.9603°E	
Tha Pyay Chaung	161693	Tha Pyay Chaung	16.6924°N 95.0188°E	
Tha Pyu Chaung	217422	Tha Yaw Bone		
Tha Pyu Pin Seik	158621	Nyaung Taw Su	16.5484°N 94.9896°E	
Tha Yaw Bone	161835	Tha Yaw Bone	16.5674°N 94.9753°E	
Tha Yaw Bone (Middle)	161838	Tha Yaw Bone	16.5933°N 94.9638°E	
Tha Yaw Bone Chaung Hpyar	161836	Tha Yaw Bone	16.5671°N 94.9907°E	
Tha Yaw Bone Chaung Phyar	217418	Kan Chaung (Tha Yaw Bone)		
Tha Yaw Bone Thu Gyi Su	161839	Tha Yaw Bone	16.5742°N 94.9677°E	
Tha Yaw Bone Ywar Thit	161837	Tha Yaw Bone		
Tha Yaw Hpone Hpyar	160860	Ta Khun Taing		
Tha Yaw Kwayt	161840	Tha Yaw Kwayt	16.4542°N 95.0312°E	
Tha Yet Chaung Ah Wai Su	154412	Khway Lay Gyi	16.5292°N 94.8055°E	
Tha Yet Chaung Hpar	154419	Khway Lay Gyi		
Tha Yet Chaung Kone Su	154420	Khway Lay Gyi		
Tha Yet Chaung Thin Baw Seik	154417	Khway Lay Gyi		
Tha Yet Kone	159719	Sa Ka Myar	16.5612°N 95.0412°E	
Tha Yet Kone	161898	Tha Yet Kone	16.5077°N 94.9787°E	
Tha Yet Taw	156201	Kyun Deik		
Tha Yet Taw	151320	Da Yei Pauk	16.4715°N 94.9726°E	
Thaing Chaung (Gwa Su)	156107	Kyon War	16.6665°N 94.9461°E	
Than Bar Chine	157765	Moke Soe Kwin	16.5834°N 94.9063°E	
Than Pu Yar Chaung	159717	Sa Ka Myar	16.5555°N 95.0353°E	
Thar Yar Chaung	217420	Ta Zin Kone Gyi		
Thar Yar Kone	152597	Htan Kone	16.4578°N 94.8852°E	
Thar Yar Kone	150241	Ah Pyin Lay Bet Twar	16.5727°N 94.7939°E	
Thaung Khon	161056	Ta Pin Chaung		
Thaung Kone	157543	Mee Thway Chaung	16.5825°N 95.0292°E	
Thein Htaung	-	Thein Htaung Village	16.438341°N 95.013081°E	
Thein Lar Chaung Hpyar	162411	Thein Lar Chaung Hpyar	16.485°N 94.827°E	
Thein Lar Gat Su	162412	Thein Lar Gat Su	16.4424°N 94.8423°E	
Thet Kwin	163580	Yan Ma Naing		
Thin Baw Chaung	163779	Ywar Thar Gyi	16.5639°N 95.0591°E	
Thin Baw Chaung	160685	Sit Kwin Kun Chan	16.565°N 95.056°E	
Thin Baw chaung (West)	161452	Teit Teit Ku		
Thin Gan Kone	163126	Wea Ka Lay	16.5991°N 94.8326°E	
Thin Pan (Ah Lel Su)	156961	Lin Daing Let Pan		
Thin Pan Yae Kyaw	156963	Lin Daing Let Pan	16.5031°N 95.0064°E	
Thit Poke Ka Lay	150950	Bu Din Kwin	16.3377°N 94.7532°E	
Thit Seik Kone	161203	Taung Ka Lay	16.5854°N 94.8581°E	
Thone Gwa	159668	Pyin Pon	16.4753°N 94.7432°E	
Thone Gwa	159532	Pyin	16.4928°N 94.9599°E	
Thone Gwa Kun Chan	162735	Thone Gwa Kun Chan	16.5322°N 94.9769°E	
Thu Htay Kone	156469	Kywet Nwe Chaung		
Tone Hle chaung	152261	Hpa Yar Chaung		
Tone Hle Chaung	153988	Kan Thar Kone	16.6413°N 94.89°E	
Tu Chaung	162874	Tu Chaung Kyaung Su	16.4807°N 94.9418°E	
U Htoke Kwin	153415	Ka Nyin Kone	16.4328°N 94.86°E	
U Nu Chaung	162909	U Nu Chaung	16.5438°N 94.991°E	
U To Chaung	151361	Dar Mya Chaung	16.4608°N 95.0022°E	
U To Wa	150348	Ah Twin Lay Bet Twar	16.5592°N 94.8124°E	
U Yin Kone	157444	Me Kyaw	16.4326°N 94.7333°E	
War Boe Taung	217440	Ka Ma Kaing		
War Chaung	159666	Pyin Pon	16.464°N 94.8135°E	
War Kyeik Lein	154409	Khway Lay Gyi	16.5318°N 94.8158°E	
War Net Chaung	163778	Ywar Thar Gyi	16.5876°N 95.0741°E	
War Net Chaung Kan Chaung	160687	Sit Kwin Kun Chan	16.5903°N 95.0681°E	
War Net Kone	160542	Sin Ku Kone Hteik Pyaung		
War Nwe Chaung	154407	Khway Lay Gyi	16.5387°N 94.8213°E	
War Nwe Chaung	159667	Pyin Pon	16.4294°N 94.7918°E	
Wea Chaung	153367	Ka Nyin Ge	16.6059°N 94.9696°E	
Wea Chaung	163585	Yan Ma Naing	16.4613°N 95.0372°E	
Wea Chaung	158299	Nga Tan Ta Yar	16.462°N 95.0107°E	
Wea Chaung	158436	Nyaung Chaung Pway Su	16.5451°N 95.0688°E	
Wea Chaung	150325	Ah Su Gyi		
Wea Chaung Hpyar	155267	Kyat Khoe Su	16.4859°N 95.0409°E	
Wea Daunt	152598	Htan Kone	16.4501°N 94.8818°E	
Wea Daunt	150645	Ba Maw Kun Thee Pin	16.6161°N 94.9122°E	
Wea Daunt	157445	Me Kyaw	16.4062°N 94.7205°E	
Wea Daunt	162736	Thone Gwa Kun Chan	16.5196°N 94.9833°E	
Wea Daunt	162877	Tu Chaung Kyaung Su		
Wea Daunt (East)	150654	Ba Maw Thone Gwa	16.6176°N 94.917°E	
Wea Daunt (West)	150653	Ba Maw Thone Gwa	16.6107°N 94.9023°E	
Wea Ka Lay	163125	Wea Ka Lay	16.5978°N 94.8472°E	
Wea Su (Ma Gu Chaung Hpyar)	153783	Kan Beit Ka Lay	16.4707°N 95.0288°E	
Yae Hlyan	163777	Ywar Thar Gyi	16.5712°N 95.0798°E	
Yae Kyaw	150948	Bu Din Kwin	16.3613°N 94.7442°E	
Yae Kyaw Kone	161208	Taung Ka Lay	16.5641°N 94.8324°E	
Yae Kyaw Kwin	217424	Kyon War		
Yae Kyaw Toe	150946	Bu Din Kwin	16.3946°N 94.7541°E	
Yae Pyar San	154555	Kone Thar	16.5549°N 94.887°E	
Yae Twin Yae Kan	161063	Ta Zin Kone Gyi	16.5585°N 94.9247°E	
Yan Ma Naing	163579	Yan Ma Naing	16.4663°N 95.029°E	
Yin Ngan	163642	Yin Ngan	16.4781°N 94.9016°E	
Yoe Da Yar Kone	156020	Kyon Tar Moke Soe Ma		
Yoe Ku	157760	Moke Soe Kwin		
Yoe Seik	154768	Kwei Lwei		
Ywar Soe Kyaung	161207	Taung Ka Lay	16.5846°N 94.8329°E	
Ywar Thar Gyi	163774	Ywar Thar Gyi	16.566°N 95.0755°E	
Ywar Thit	153190	Ka Det Kwin		
Ywar Thit	161192	Taung Dee	16.5223°N 94.8542°E	
Ywar Thit	151285	Da None Chaung	16.6348°N 94.9731°E	
Ywar Thit	150650	Ba Maw Thone Gwa	16.6426°N 94.9°E	
Ywar Thit	162910	U Nu Chaung	16.5271°N 94.993°E	
Ywar Thit	158435	Nyaung Chaung Pway Su	16.5256°N 95.0522°E	
Ywar Thit	157008	Lu Taw	16.3866°N 94.9794°E	
Ywar Thit Ka Lay	156048	Kyon Thut	16.7373°N 94.9286°E	
Ywar Thit Ka Lay	158247	Nga Myin Chaung	16.5275°N 94.7403°E	
Za Lat Kwin	217427	Taung Dee		
Zaung Yar Pin Seik	157768	Moke Soe Kwin		
Zee Hpyu Chaung	154767	Kwei Lwei		
Zee Hpyu Kone	217475	Nga Myin Chaung		
Zee Hpyu Kone	162913	U Nu Chaung	16.5236°N 94.9886°E	
Zee Pin Kone	155135	Kyar Hpu Ngon	16.634°N 94.9446°E	
Zin Pyun Kone	153567	Ka Nyut Kwin	16.6036°N 94.8681°E	
