= Saw Nyo Win =

Dr Saw Nyo Win
- စောညိုဝင်း

Minister for Natural Resources, Forest and Environmental Conservation for Bago Region
- Incumbent
- Assumed office 29 January 2018

Member of the Bago Region Hluttaw
- Incumbent
- Assumed office 1 February 2016
- Constituency: Thanatpin Township №.1
- Majority: 18,628 votes

Personal details
- Born: 15 August 1972 (age 54) Thanatpin, Bago Region, Myanmar
- Party: National League for Democracy
- Parent: Kyaw Win (father)
- Education: University of Dental Medicine, Yangon
- Occupation: Politician
- Cabinet: Bago Region Government

Saw Nyo Win (Burmese: စောညိုဝင်း) is a Burmese politician who currently serves as the Bago Region Minister for Natural Resources, Forest and Environmental Conservation, and Region Parliament MP for Thanatpin Township №.1.

== Early life and career ==
Saw Nyo Win was born on 15 August 1972 in Thanatpin, Bago Region, Myanmar. He graduated with B.D.S from University of Dental Medicine, Yangon in 1999, F.I.C.D. (USA) in 2013 and F.I.C.C.D.E in 2014. His previous job is Dental and Oral specialist doctor. He had served for a public service as intern at Thingangyun Sanpya Hospital from 1998 to 1999, school health work at Bago from 2000 to 2006, People's Hospital, Gangaw from 2007 to 2009 and People's Hospital, Waw from 2010 to 2011. After he resigned from doctor work, he became an active member of National League for Democracy in 2012 and served as the chairman of NLD Bago District.

== Political career ==
Win is a member of the National League for Democracy. In the 2015 Myanmar general election, he was elected as a Bago Region Hluttaw MP, winning a majority of 18,628 votes, from Thanatpin Township №1 parliamentary constituency.

He is also serving as a Regional Minister of Bago Region Minister for Natural Resources, Forest and Environmental Conservation.
