= Gwa Village =

Gwa
- Location within Myanmar
- Coordinates: 17°05′48″N 96°31′48″E
- Country: Myanmar
- Region: Bago Region
- District: Bago District
- Township: Kawa Township

Gwa (Burmese: ဂွ) is a village in Kawa Township of Bago Region, Myanmar.
