= Ziphyugon =

Zee Hpyu Kone
- Location within Myanmar
- Coordinates: 16°59′26″N 96°31′36″E
- Country: Myanmar
- Region: Bago Region
- District: Bago District
- Township: Kawa Township

Zee Hpyu Kone (Burmese: ဇီးဖြူကုန်း) Village is a village in Kawa Township, Bago Region, Myanmar.
