= Kha Mun Village =

Kha Mun
- Location within Myanmar
- Coordinates: 16°59′41″N 96°34′29″E
- Country: Myanmar
- Region: Bago Region
- District: Bago District
- Township: Kawa Township

Kha Mun (Burmese: ခမွန်) is a village in Kawa Township, Bago Region, Myanmar.
