= San Maung Maung =

Burmese politician

Member of the Amyotha Hluttaw
- Incumbent
- Assumed office 3 February 2016
- Constituency: Bago Region № 1

Personal details
- Born: 24 May 1958 (age 67) Nyaunglebin, Myanmar
- Party: National League for Democracy
- Spouse: Myat Mon
- Children: 2
- Parent(s): Htun Hla (father); Hla Po(mother)
- Education: M.B.B.S

San Maung Maung also San Mg Mg (Burmese: စန်းမောင်, born 24 May 1958) is a Burmese politician who serves as an Amyotha Hluttaw MP for Bago Region No.1 Constituency. He is a member of the National League for Democracy.

== Early life and education ==
San Maung Maung was born in Nyaunglebin Township, Bago Region, Myanmar . He graduated M.B.B.S from University of Medicine 1, Yangon. He previously worked as a Medical Doctor.

== Political career ==
He is a member of the National League for Democracy. In the 2015 Myanmar general election, he was elected as an Amyotha Hluttaw MP and elected representative from Bago Region No. 1 parliamentary constituency. He also serves as a Secretary of Amyotha Hluttaw Health, Sports and Culture Committee.
