= Kyaukkyi =

Kyaukkyi may refer to:

- Kyaukkyi Township, a township in Taungoo District, Bago Region, Myanmar
  - Kyaukkyi, Bago, a town in Kyaukkyi Township
- Kyaukkyi, Bhamo, a village in Shwegu Township, Bhamo District, Kachin State, Myanmar
