= Kawa, Myanmar =

Kawa ကဝမြို့
- Town
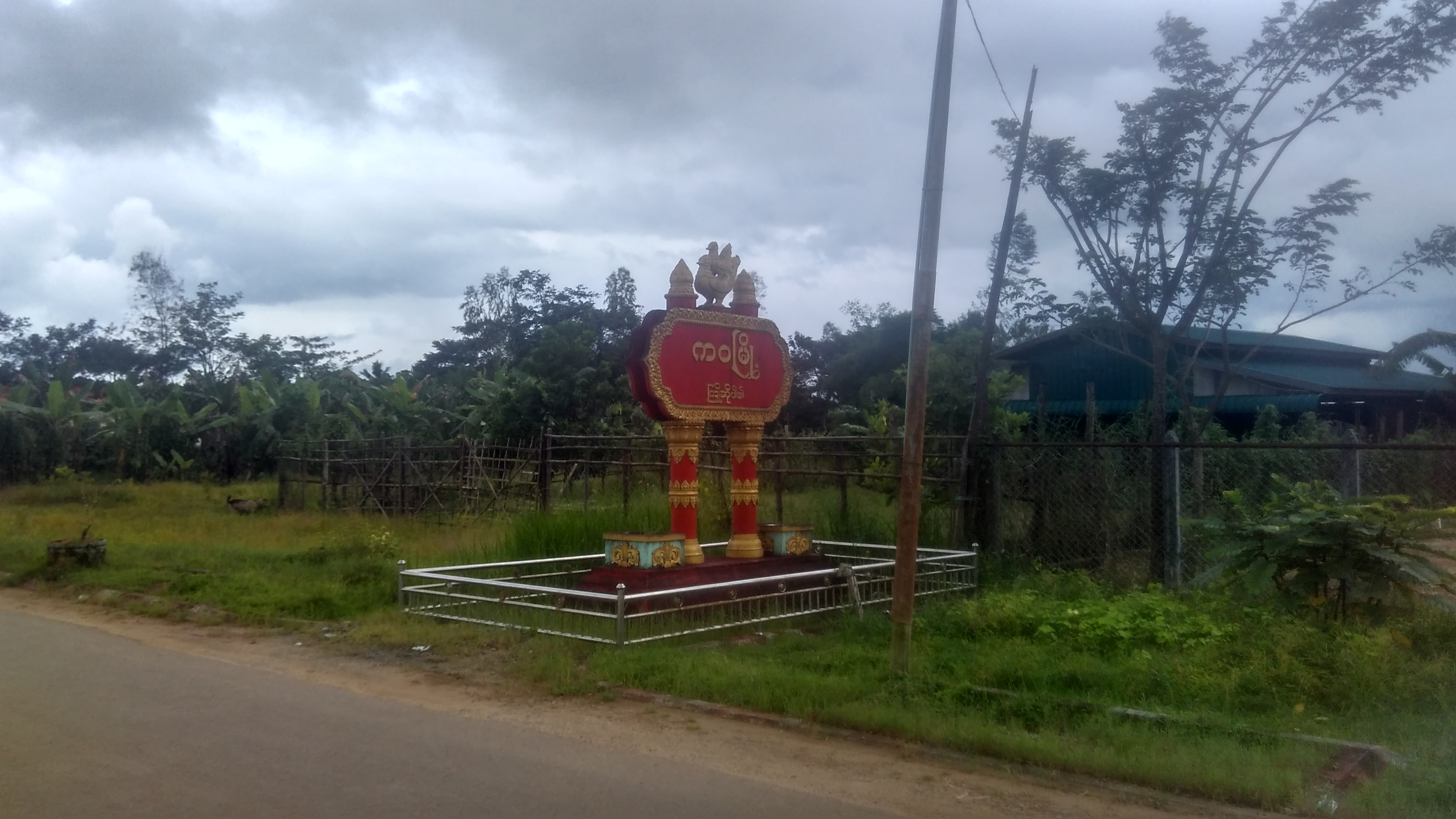

- Location within Myanmar
- Coordinates: 17°05′23″N 96°27′59″E
- Country: Myanmar
- Region: Bago Region
- District: Bago District
- Township: Kawa Township

Population (2014)
  - Total: 17,396
- Time zone: UTC+7 (Myanmar Standard Time)

Kawa (Burmese: ကဝမြို့; Mon: ဍုင်ကဝ) is a town located in the Bago Region of Myanmar (previously known as Burma). It is part of the Bago District and is located on the eastern bank of the Bago River south of Bago. Kawa is the administrative seat of the Kawa Township.

== Etymology ==
Kawa is a place name of Mon origin; Kawa (ကဝ) means "Lin Myee Swe" bird (Greater racket-tailed drongo). The village was formed near the region where the bird lived, and the village soon became known as Kawa.

== Transportation ==
Htone Gyi Station, which is on the Yangon-Bago Railway, is about 1 mile (1.6 km) from Kawa, and is reached by an asphalt road that crosses the Bago River over the Bago River Crossing Bridge (Kawa). Kawa is also accessible by road, on the Intagaw-Htone Gyi-Kawa Road or the Yangon-Bago Highway.

=== Bago River Crossing Bridge ===
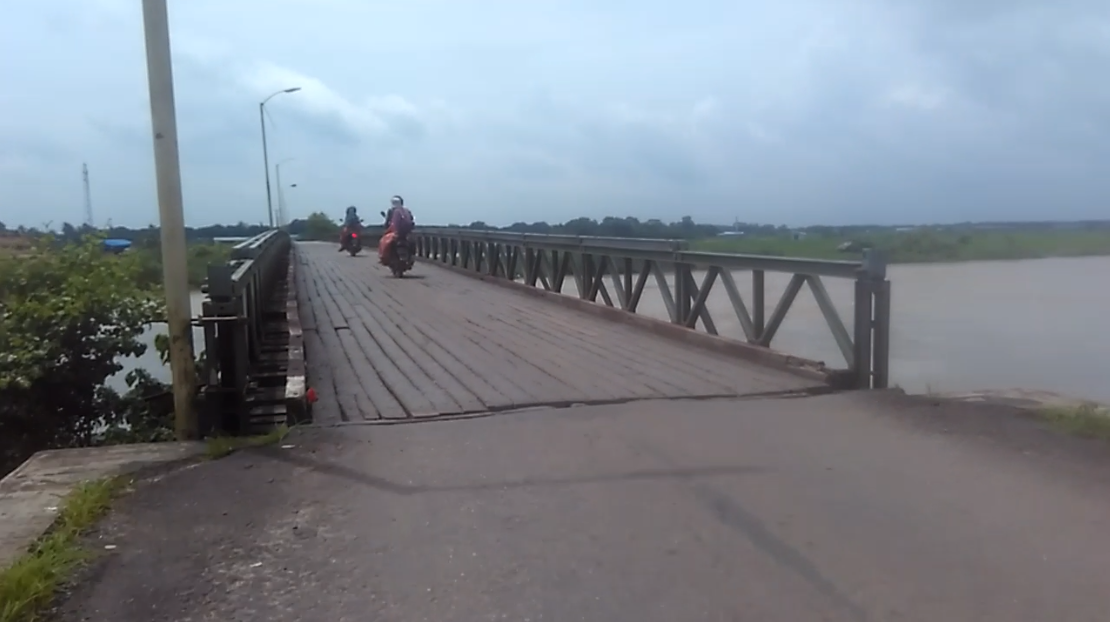
The Bago River Crossing Bridge (Kawa)

The Bago River Crossing Bridge (Kawa) is a bridge that crosses the Bago River. Kawa was formerly adjacent to Yangon but was difficult to access by road. Formerly, to get to Yangon from Kawa, the Bago River needed to be crossed by boat. Now, the Bago River Crossing Bridge (Kawa) has been completed. The bridge connects Htone Gyi village with the Kawa Township.

== Population ==
According to the 2014 census, the population of the town is 17,396. The town had a population of 2,336 in 1953.

== Economy ==
In Kawa, crops are grown on large paddy fields. Being located between the Sittaung River and the Bago River, there are salt marshes that have formed near the coasts. Kawa is also well known for its production of bags and cotton.
