= Tha Meit Chaung Village =

Coordinates: 16°58′52″N 96°25′41″E

Tha Meit Chaung (Burmese: သမဲ့ချောင်း) Village is a village in Kawa Township, Bago Region, Myanmar.
