= Nchumbulu language =

Guang language of Ghana

Nchummuru
- Nchumbulu
- Native to: Ghana
- Native speakers: 1,800 (2003)
- Language family: Niger–Congo?: Atlantic–Congo; Volta-Congo; Kwa; Nyo; Potou–Tano; Tano; Guang; North; Nchummuru

Language codes
- ISO 639-3: nlu
- Glottolog: nchu1238
- ELP: Nchumbulu

Nchumbulu or Nchummuru is a Guang language of Ghana. It is spoken in parts of Bono East, Oti, Northern and Savannah regions.

== Resources ==
- Batibo, H. (2004). The role of minority languages in education and development in Africa. The language web: Essays in honour of Victor Webb, 26-33.
- Blench, R. (2007). Endangered languages in West Africa. Language diversity endangered
- Goody, Jack R. (1963). Ethnological Notes on the distribution of the Guang Languages. Journal of African Languages 2. 173-189.
- Edu-Buandoh, Dora Francisca. Multilingualism in Ghana: An ethnographic study of college students at the University of Cape Coast. ProQuest, 2006.
