= Ohn Hne Village =

Village in Myanmar

Coordinates: 17°06′18″N 96°35′05″E

Ohn Hne (Burmese: အုန်းနှဲ) Village is a village in Kawa Township, Bago Region, Myanmar.
