= Alegon =

- Location in Burma
- Coordinates: 18°33′0″N 96°38′0″E
- Country: Burma
- Division: Bago Region
- Township: Kyaukkyi Township

Population (2005)
  - Religions: Buddhism
- Time zone: UTC+6.30 (MST)

Alegon is a village in the Bago Region of north-west Myanmar. It lies in Kyaukkyi Township in the Taungoo District.

== See also ==
- List of cities, towns and villages in Burma: A
