= Moe Nyo U Ko Ko Gyi =

Burmese politician during the time of 1940-1960

- Born: January 26, 1912; Moe Nyo Myo, Pegu (Bago Division), Burma (Myanmar)
- Died: December 21, 2006 (aged 94); Rangoon (Yangon), Burma (Myanmar)
- Education: I.A., Rangoon University
- Occupation: Parliamentary Secretary of the Government of the Union of Burma
- Known for: Politician
- Political party: AFPFL (Anti-Fascist Peoples' Federation League)
- Spouse(s): Daw Ahmar Kyi (First) & Daw Sein Yin (Second after the death of Daw Ahmar Kyi)
- Children: Khin Maung Oo, Awba Thein Tun, Geneva Myo Tun, Sonny Kyi Wynn & Tommy Ye Win
- Parent(s): 'Myo-thu-gyi' U Thaung Pe & Daw Ohn

Moe Nyo Ko Ko Gyi (Burmese: မိုးညိုဦးကိုကိုကြီး) was a Burmese politician who served as Parliamentary Secretary in the Union of Burma (present-day Myanmar) during the mid-20th century. He was known for his contributions to housing and urban development initiatives across the country, including overseeing the construction of schools, hospitals, and residential complexes.

One of his most notable projects was the development of Yankin, a suburb in the outskirts of Yangon (then Rangoon), Burma's former capital. Yankin became the earliest and most significant urban development project under his leadership, transforming it into a modern residential and civic hub.

== Early life and education ==
Moe Nyo U Ko Ko Gyi was born on January 26, 1912, in Moe Nyo, Tharrawaddy District Pegu Division (now Bago Region), British Burma. He was the eldest son of Thaung Pe, a myothugyi (town chief administrator), and Daw Ohn.

In 1933, he enrolled at Rangoon University (now the University of Yangon). However, he did not complete his degree, reportedly due to his reluctance to remain apart from his family. Some sources suggest his studies were further disrupted by growing political unrest and nationalist movements at the university during this period.

== Resistance against British and Japanese rule ==
Moe Nyo U Ko Ko Gyi joined the Burma Independence Army (BIA) in 1941 and participated in anti-colonial resistance activities during the Japanese-backed campaign against British rule. After the Japanese occupation of Burma began in 1942, he shifted focus to resisting Japanese forces, becoming part of the broader underground resistance movement. Though his formal service with the BIA ended in 1942, he continued covert operations in Tharrawaddy District, organizing local resistance networks during the occupation.

He was also an active member of the nationalist organization Dobama Asiayone ("Our Burma Association") in his hometown of Moe Nyo, advocating for Burmese self-rule.

== Political career ==
Moe Nyo U Ko Ko Gyi held multiple leadership roles in Burmese political and labor organizations during the mid-20th century. From 1946 to 1948, he served as General Secretary of the All Burma Ministerial Services Union. He later led the Rangoon District Socialist Party (1950–1957) and became Secretary of the Trade Union Congress (Burma) in 1950. Elected to parliament twice, he represented his hometown of Moe Nyo in 1951 and 1956. Concurrently, he served as vice-chairman of the Rangoon District Anti-Fascist People's Freedom League (AFPFL) (1950–1957) and Divisional Secretary of the Pegu Division AFPFL from 1958 onward.

His political career was interrupted in March 1962 when General Ne Win's Revolutionary Council seized power in a coup. During the subsequent socialist regime, Ko Ko Gyi was periodically consulted by Ne Win's government as an advisor on national reconstruction efforts. Though never a member of the ruling Burma Socialist Program Party (BSPP), he held several state-affiliated roles, including:

- Council member of the Kyauk-ta-da Township Peoples’ Council and member of its judicial committee.
- Vice-chair of the Kyauk-ta-da Township Cooperatives Society, a state-managed entity overseeing local commerce.
- Board member of the Central Cooperatives Society, a government-mandated body responsible for managing food and household commodity distribution during Burma's socialist era (1962–1988).

== Public services ==
Moe Nyo U Ko Ko Gyi held several key administrative roles in post-independence Burma. From 1954 to 1958, he served as Parliamentary Secretary for Public Works and Housing, overseeing infrastructure and urban development policies. His earlier public service included:

- Membership on the Inland Water Transport Board (1951–1953).
- Participation in the Port Inquiry Commission, which investigated maritime infrastructure needs.
- Vice-chairmanship of the National Housing, Town, and Country Development Board (1952–1957), where he contributed to nationwide urban planning initiatives.

Following the 1962 coup led by General Ne Win, Ko Ko Gyi was retained by the socialist regime as an Officer on Special Duty (OSD) at the Ministry of Transport and Communications. He served under Minister Colonel Than Sein from 1968 until his retirement in 1972, assisting in the ministry's operations during Burma's transition to a centralized socialist economy.

== Notable international award ==
In 1956, Moe Nyo U Ko Ko Gyi was awarded the Order of Menelik II by Ethiopia, one of the country's highest honors for distinguished public service.

== International engagements ==
Moe Nyo U Ko Ko Gyi participated in numerous diplomatic and political missions abroad between 1948 and 1957. Key activities included:

- Official visits to India and Pakistan (1948–1957) to strengthen regional ties.
- Membership in Burma's delegation to the International Labour Organization (ILO) Conference in Geneva (1951).
- Service on the ILO Asian Advisory Committee in Geneva (1951–1953).
- Participation in a Burmese Trade Union Mission to China, the Soviet Union, Poland, and Czechoslovakia (1953).
- Leadership of a House Delegation to Thailand (1954).
- Representation at the Asian Socialist Conference in Bombay (now Mumbai, India) (1956).
- Delegation to the United Nations General Assembly (UNGA) in New York (1957).

He also joined political delegations to Western Europe and the United Kingdom during this period, advocating for Burma's post-independence interests on the global stage.

== Publications ==
Moe Nyo U Ko Ko Gyi authored two influential Burmese-language political works:

- India Today (1948), analyzing post-colonial transitions in South Asia.
- New Democracy (1949), advocating for socialist reforms in Burma's nascent democratic framework.

== Marriage and residences ==
Moe Nyo U Ko Ko Gyi married twice. His first wife was Ahmar Kyi, and after her death, he wed Sein Yin, a Bachelor of Commerce graduate and registered accountant (B.Com., RA). He fathered five children across these marriages.

The family resided in several locations:

- Thayetaw Lane, Thingangyun, Rangoon (now Yangon).
- 39th Street, Kyauktada Township, Rangoon (Yangon).
- Thuwunna (Myintha) and Minhla Town, Pegu Division (now Bago Region).
- Thuwunna Myo, Rangoon (Yangon), where he spent his final years.
