= Ngachin =

Fermented fish product used in Burmese cuisine

- Alternative names: sour fish, pickled fish
- Place of origin: Myanmar (Burma)
- Associated cuisine: Burmese cuisine
- Main ingredients: fish, boiled rice, salt
- Similar dishes: Ngapi

Ngachin (Burmese: ငါးချဉ်; lit. 'sour fish'), also called pickled fish, is a traditional fermented fish product used in Burmese cuisine. Ngachin consists of raw freshwater fish, which is pressed with a mixture of cooked rice gruel and salt as it ferments, and is traditionally packed in taungzun leaves. Bronze featherback is typically used for ngachin, although other freshwater varieties like rohu can be substituted. The version using shrimp is called bazunchin (ပုစွန်ချဉ်, lit. 'sour shrimp').

Ngachin is popularly served in a Burmese salad, mixed with garlic, shallots, fresh chillies, coriander and served with rice. In Madauk, ngachin is commonly served in mohinga, a rice noodle soup.

== In popular culture ==
Ngachin is the subject of a popular Burmese proverb, "homemade ngachin tastes better" (ကိုယ့်ငါးချဉ် ကိုယ်ချဉ်), reflecting the shortcomings of personal biases.

== See also ==
- Burmese cuisine
- Shrimp paste
- Fermented fish
