= Kyauktaga =

Kyauktaga ကျောက်တံခါး
- Town
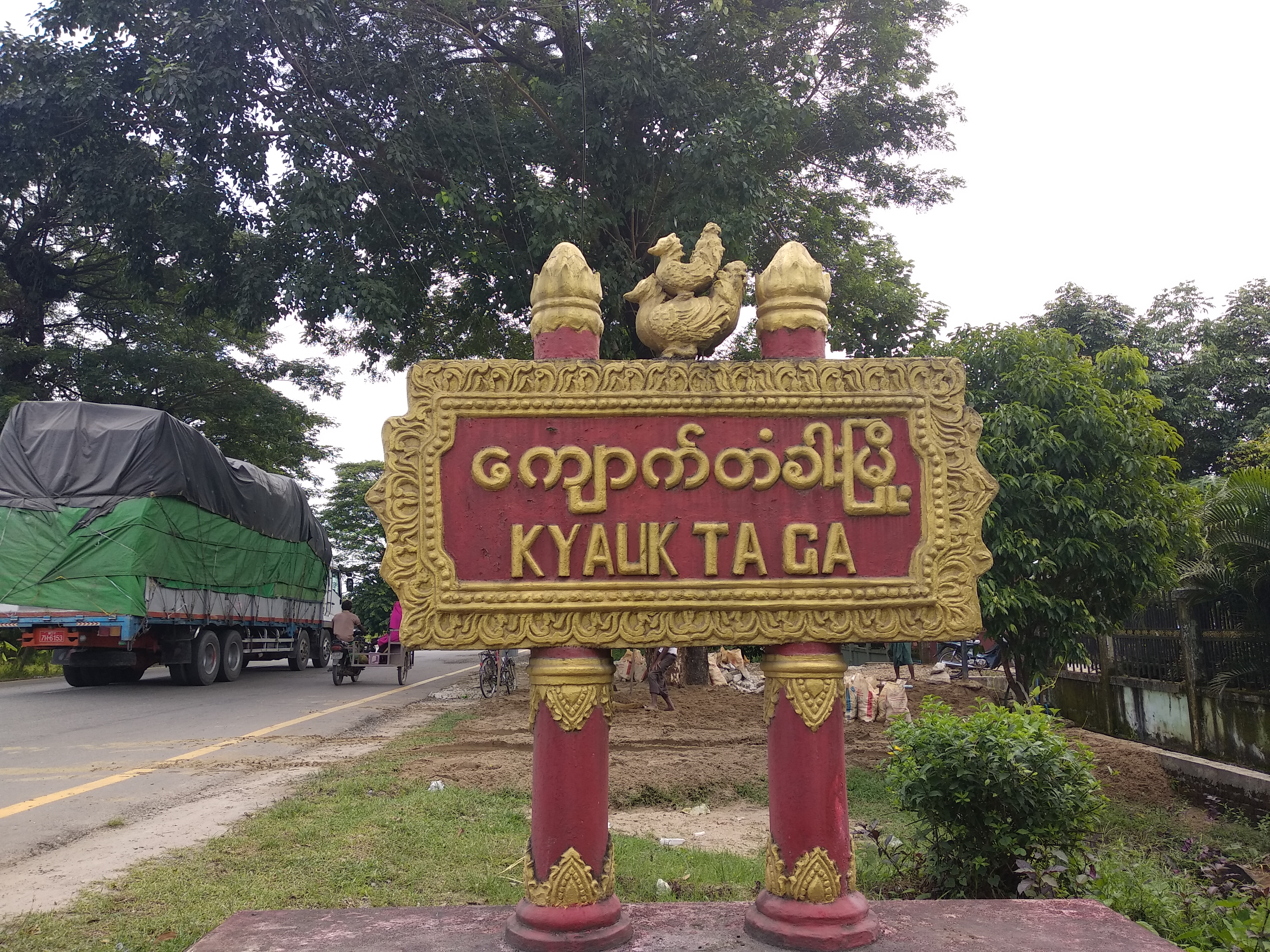

- Location in Myanmar
- Coordinates: 18°9′22″N 96°36′47″E
- Country: Myanmar
- Region: Bago Region
- District: Nyaunglebin
- Township: Kyauktaga
- Time zone: UTC+6.30 (MST)

Kyauktaga (Burmese: ကျောက်တံခါး) is a town in Kyauktaga Township, Nyaunglebin District, Bago Region in Myanmar. It is the administrative seat of Kyauktaga Township. The old Yangon-Mandalay highway passes through Kyauktaga Township. The Yangon-Mandalay railway also runs through Kyauktaga Township.
