= Madauk =

Madauk မဒေါက်မြို့
- Town
- Location within Myanmar
- Coordinates: 17°54′39″N 96°50′40″E
- Country: Myanmar
- Region: Bago Region
- District: Bago District
- Township: Nyaunglebin Township
- Time zone: UTC+6.30 (Myanmar Standard Time)

Madauk (Mon: ကမာဍိုတ်; Burmese: မဒေါက်) is a town located in Nyaunglebin Township, Bago Region of Myanmar. Madauk is an ancient city that has been famous since the time of the ancient Mon kings.

== Etymology ==
The town's name is of Mon origin. Pronounced Kamadauk, it literally translates to "brick reservoir" in Mon. Although Madauk and Shwegyin are separate towns, they are often referred to as Shwegyin Magadauk. Shwegyin and Madawk are only 2.5 miles (4.0 km) apart, but the Sittaung River separates the two towns. Nyaunglebin and Madauk are connected by a 11.25 mi (18.11 km) railway.
