= Zwe Tun Village =

Coordinates: 16°59′09″N 96°35′17″E

Zwe Tun (Burmese: ဇွဲတွန်) Village is a village in Kawa Township, Bago Region, Myanmar.
