= Kyauk Ka Lay Village =

Myanmar village

Coordinates: 17°02′33″N 96°24′23″E

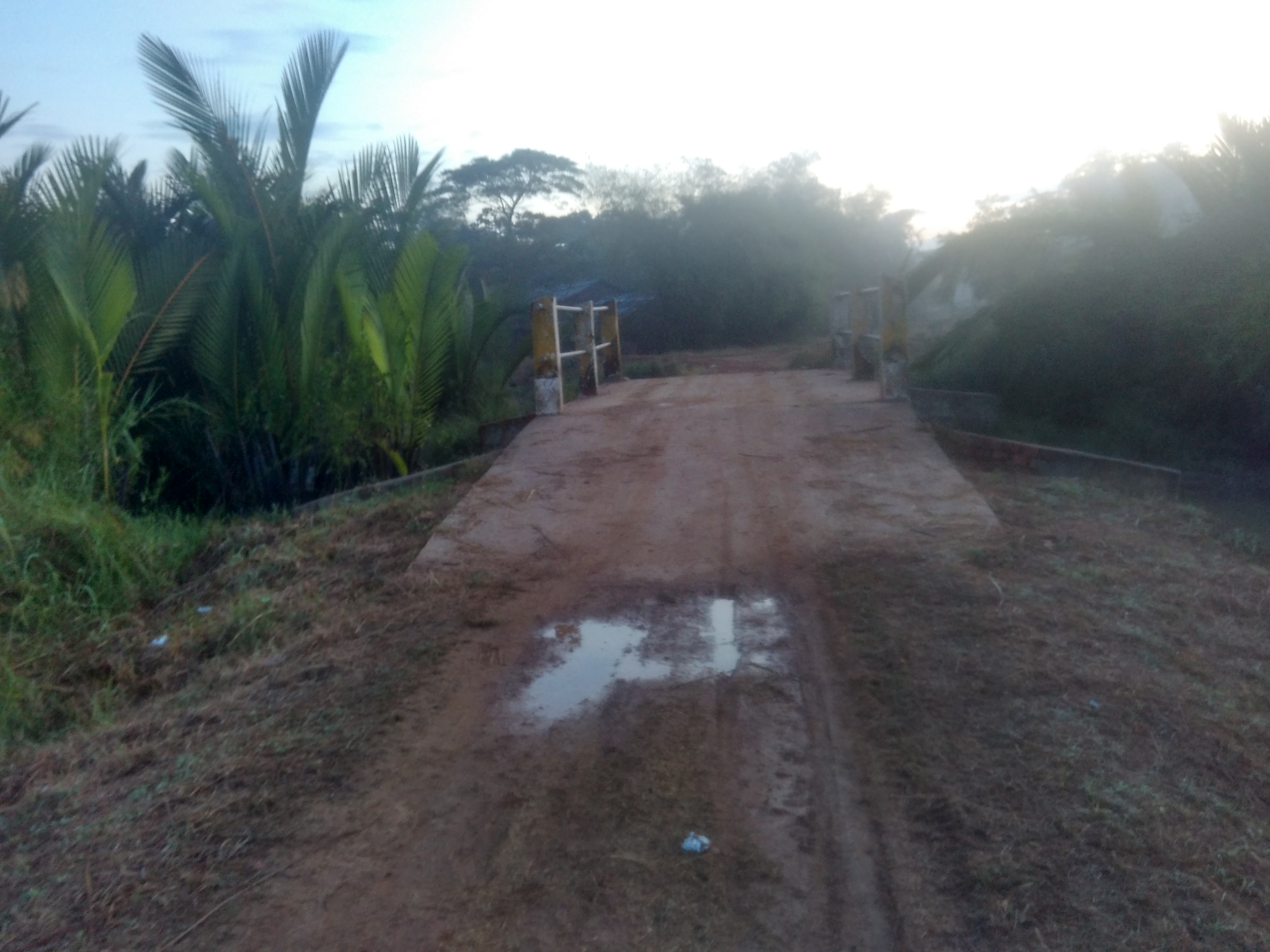
Kyauk Ka Lay Village

Kyauk Ka Lay (Burmese: ကျောက်ကလေး) Village is a village in Kawa Township, Bago Region, Myanmar.
