= Kan Pyaung Village =

Coordinates: 16°58′27″N 96°29′01″E

Kan Pyaung (Burmese: ကမ်းပြောင်ရွာ) Village is a village in Kawa Township, Bago Region, Myanmar.
