= Ta Man Gyi Village =

Coordinates: 17°01′31″N 96°24′04″E

Ta Man Gyi (Burmese: တမံကြီး) Village is a village in Kawa Township, Bago Region, Myanmar.
