= Thanatpin =

Thanatpin သနပ္ပင် or သနပ်ပင် Thanatbyin
- Town
- Location in Burma
- Coordinates: 17°17′39″N 96°34′48″E
- Country: Myanmar
- Region: Bago Region
- District: Bago District
- Township: Thanatpin Township

Population
  - Total: 145,287
- Time zone: UTC+6.30 (MST)

Thanatpin is a town in Thanatpin Township, Bago District, Bago Region in Myanmar. It is the administrative seat of Thanatpin Township.
