= Pyuntaza =

Pyuntaza ပြွန်တန်ဆာမြို့
- Town
- Location in Burma
- Coordinates: 17°52′N 96°44′E
- Country: Myanmar
- Region: Bago Region
- District: Bago District
- Township: Nyaunglebin Township
- Time zone: UTC+6.30 (MST)

Pyuntaza (Burmese: ပြွန်တန်ဆာမြို့, MLCTS: pywan ti cha mrui.; also spelt Pyuntasa) is a small town located in Nyaunglebin Township, Bago District, Bago Region, Myanmar. It is about 70 kilometres (43 mi) from Bago (formerly Pegu).

The dominant ethnic group is Bamar, although there is a substantial number of Karen. The town's main economy consists of rice cultivation and distribution.

== Etymology ==
The name Pyuntaza comes from the Mon language term plaem sotchaek (ပလီုသစ္စ, Mon pronunciation: [pəlɜ̀m sɔtcɛˀ]), which means "to break vows."

== History ==
Historical population
Year	Pop.	±%
1891	23,132	—
1901	52,952	+128.9%

In the colonial era, Pyuntaza was administered as a township of Pegu District in Lower Burma, covering an area of 1,443 square miles (3,740 km^{2}) and consisting of 232 villages. The township's population in 1901 was 52,952 persons, having more than doubled since 1891 (23,132). The western flank of the former Pyuntaza Township is hilly, while the eastern half is a flat rice-producing area.

From 1920 to 1931, with the emergence of a national railway system extending north–south, Pyuntaza emerged as a railway center town, along with neighbouring Daik-U. By rail, Pyuntaza was 88 miles (142 km) from Rangoon (now Yangon).

During World War II, prominent Burmese barrister U Chan Htoon retreated to Pyuntaza as his place of retirement.
