= Kyauktaga Township =

Kyauktaga Township ကျောက်တံခါး မြို့နယ် Kyaukdaga Township
- Township
- Location in Nyaunglebin district
- Coordinates: 18°11′N 96°21′E
- Country: Myanmar
- Region: Bago Region
- District: Nyaunglebin District
- Capital: Kyauktaga

Area
  - Total: 2,831 km^{2} (1,093 sq mi)
- Time zone: UTC+6.30 (MST)

Kyauktaga Township (Burmese: ကျောက်တံခါးမြို့နယ်) is a township in Nyaunglebin District in the Bago Region of Burma (Myanmar). The principal town is Kyauktaga, and Penwegon (or Penwegone) is the other major town. Both are located on the Bago–Taungoo highway and rail line.

== History ==
From Myanmar's independence in 1948 to 1975, Kyauktaga Township was a stronghold for two separate groups: the Communist Party of Burma and Karen resistance forces.

=== Myanmar civil war (2021–present) ===
On 7 June 2023, Major Nay Lin Oo, a member of the township military council, and Thura, a village administrator, were riding a motorcycle together when they were gunned down by the People's Defence Force of Bago Region.

In August 2023, the township became a site of fierce fighting between the military junta and anti-junta forces. By late December, resistance groups began attacking the headquarters of the Light Infantry Battalion 308 near Penwegon town.

== Towns in Kyauktaga Township ==
Kyauktaga Township contains the following Towns:

- Kyauktaga
- Penwegon
- Hpa Do
- Taw Kywe Inn

== Communities ==
Kyauktaga Township is subdivided into 13 wards and 47 Village Tracts which consist of 283 villages.

== Notable resident ==
- Bo Hmu Aung (1910-2004), a member of the Thirty Comrades
