= Tha Pyay Kan =

Coordinates: 17°03′46″N 96°26′21″E

Tha Pyay Kan (Burmese: သပြေကန်ရွာ) Village is a village in Kawa Township, Bago Region, Myanmar. Almost all of the people are Burmese. It has a primary school for education. It is located near the Bago river. There are two Buddhist monasteries: East Tha Pyay Kan Monastery (သပြေကန်အရှေ့ကျောင်း) and West Buddhist Monastery (သပြေကန်အနောက်ကျောင်း). As of the 2014 census data, the population of the village was 1039.

== Gallery ==
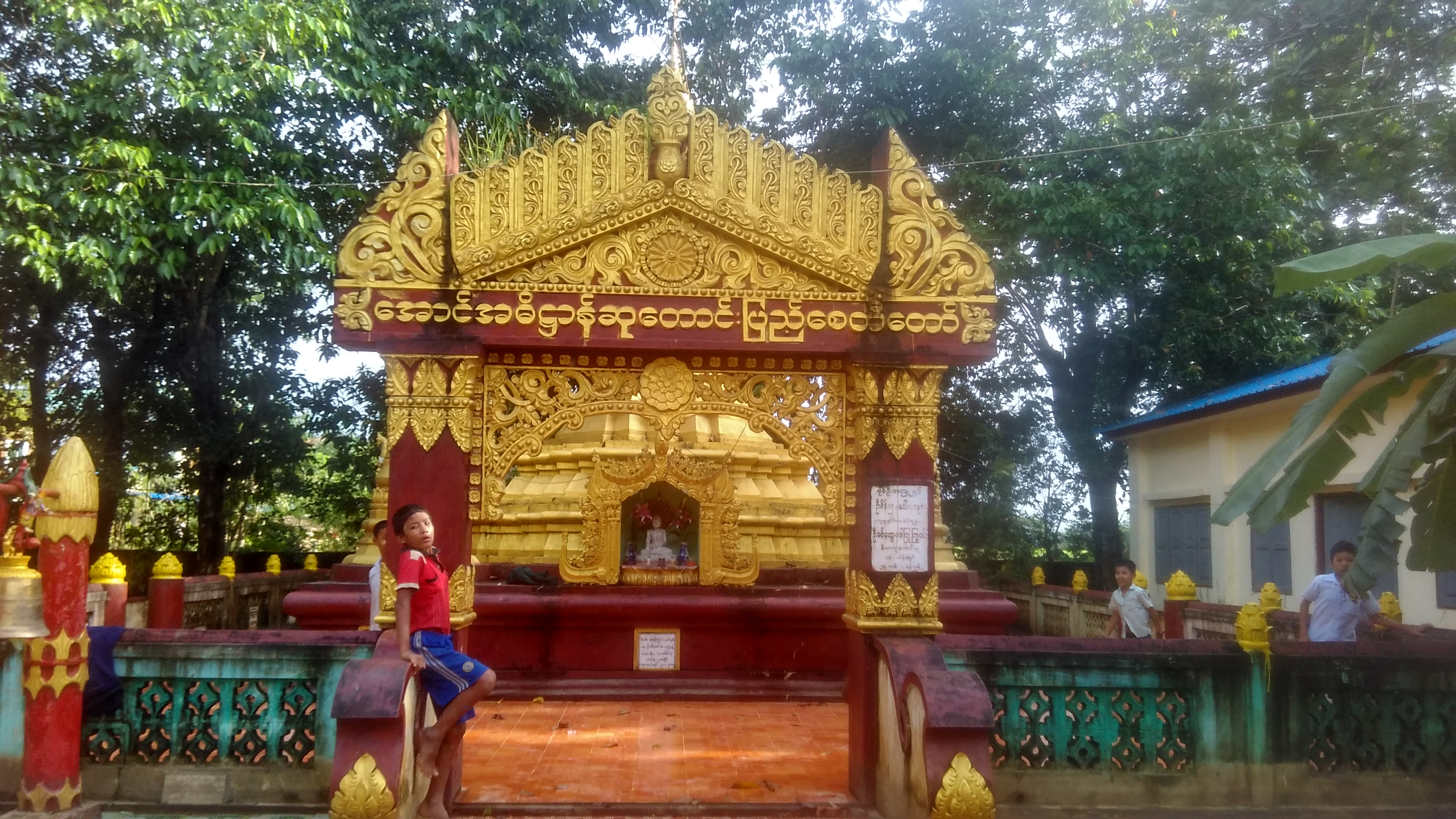
Stupa at East Buddhist Monastery

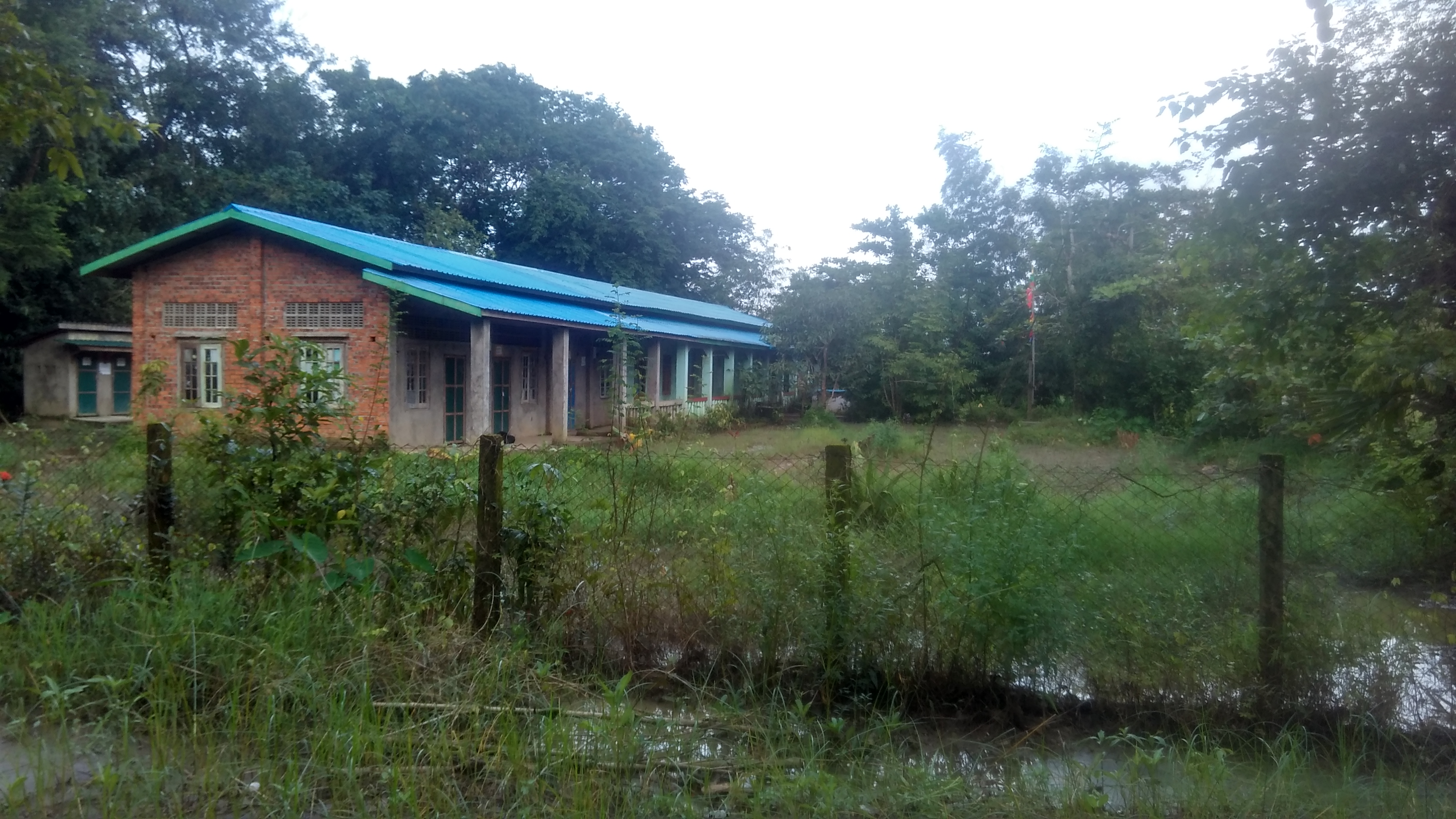
School of the village
