= Shwegyin (town) =

Shwegyin ရွှေကျင်မြို့ Saw Hti
- Town
- Location in Myanmar
- Coordinates: 17°55′0″N 96°53′0″E
- Country: Myanmar
- Region: Bago Region
- District: Nyaunglebin District
- Township: Shwegyin
- Time zone: UTC+6.30 (MST)
- Area code: 54

Shwegyin (Burmese: ရွှေကျင်မြို့) is a town in Nyaunglebin District, Bago Region in Myanmar. It is also called Saw Hti (Burmese: ဆောထိမြို့). It is the administrative seat of Shwegyin Township. Parts of the town and township are under the control of the Karen National Union.

== Climate ==
Climate data for Shwegyin (1981–2010)
Month	Jan	Feb	Mar	Apr	May	Jun	Jul	Aug	Sep	Oct	Nov	Dec	Year
Mean daily maximum °C (°F)	32.6 (90.7)	34.6 (94.3)	37.1 (98.8)	38.2 (100.8)	34.7 (94.5)	30.7 (87.3)	29.8 (85.6)	29.7 (85.5)	31.4 (88.5)	33.2 (91.8)	33.3 (91.9)	32.1 (89.8)	33.1 (91.6)
Mean daily minimum °C (°F)	15.7 (60.3)	17.5 (63.5)	20.8 (69.4)	24.4 (75.9)	24.9 (76.8)	24.1 (75.4)	23.8 (74.8)	23.8 (74.8)	23.8 (74.8)	23.4 (74.1)	20.8 (69.4)	16.8 (62.2)	21.7 (71.1)
Average rainfall mm (inches)	1.6 (0.06)	3.7 (0.15)	6.8 (0.27)	46.2 (1.82)	247.8 (9.76)	656.2 (25.83)	797.9 (31.41)	837.9 (32.99)	424.0 (16.69)	197.6 (7.78)	39.2 (1.54)	1.6 (0.06)	3,260.5 (128.37)
Source: Norwegian Meteorological Institute
