= Amyotha Hluttaw Health, Sports and Culture Committee =

At 14 March 2017, Amyotha Hluttaw Health, Sports and Culture Committee was re-founded in the Amyotha Hluttaw by MPs.The chairman is Zaw Linn Htut (Mon State Constituency No.9 MP) and the secretary is San Maung Maung (Bago Region Constituency No.9 MP). The committee was founded by 14 members (MPs).
