= Mu Du, Myanmar =

Village in Myanmar

Coordinates: 17°03′00″N 96°35′10″E

Mu Du (Burmese: မုဒုရွာ) Village is a village in Kawa Township, Bago Region, Myanmar.
