= Hti Tan =

Coordinates: 17°00′28″N 96°33′53″E

Hti Tan (Burmese: ထိတန်) Village is a village in Kawa Township, Bago Region, Myanmar.
