= Shwegyin Township =

Township in Bago Region, Myanmar

Coordinates: 17°55′44″N 96°52′51″E

Shwegyin Township ရွှေကျင်မြို့နယ် Saw Hti Township
- Township
- Location in Nyaunglebin District
- Country: Myanmar
- Region: Bago Region
- District: Nyaunglebin District
- Capital: Shwegyin (town)

Population (2014)
  - Total: 107,462
- Time zone: UTC+6.30 (MMT)

Shwegyin Township (Burmese: ရွှေကျင်မြို့နယ်) is a township in Nyaunglebin District in the Bago Region of Myanmar. It is also called Saw Hti Township (Burmese: ဆောထိမြို့နယ်). The principal town is Shwegyin.
