= Nyaunglebin Township =

Township in Bago Region, Myanmar

Coordinates: 17°57′21″N 96°43′23″E

Nyaunglebin Township ညောင်လေးပင်မြို့နယ်
- Township
- Location in Bago district
- Country: Myanmar
- Region: Bago Region
- District: Nyaunglebin District
- Capital: Nyaunglebin

Population (2014)
  - Total: 199,483
- Time zone: UTC+6.30 (MST)

Nyaunglebin Township (Burmese: ညောင်လေးပင်မြို့နယ်) is a township situated in Nyaunglebin District, Bago Region of Myanmar. The township and district seat is Nyaunglebin. Nyaunglebin Township consists of four towns—Nyaunglebin, Pyuntasa, Madauk, and Painzalok—as well as numerous villages.

== Demographics ==
Ethnic composition of Nyaunglebin Township
Ethnic group	Percentage
Bamar	93.6%
Kayin	6.4%
Source: 2019 GAD township reports

The Bamar make up the majority of the township's population, while the Karen form the largest minority group.
