= Ngapi =

Seafood paste used in Burmese cuisine

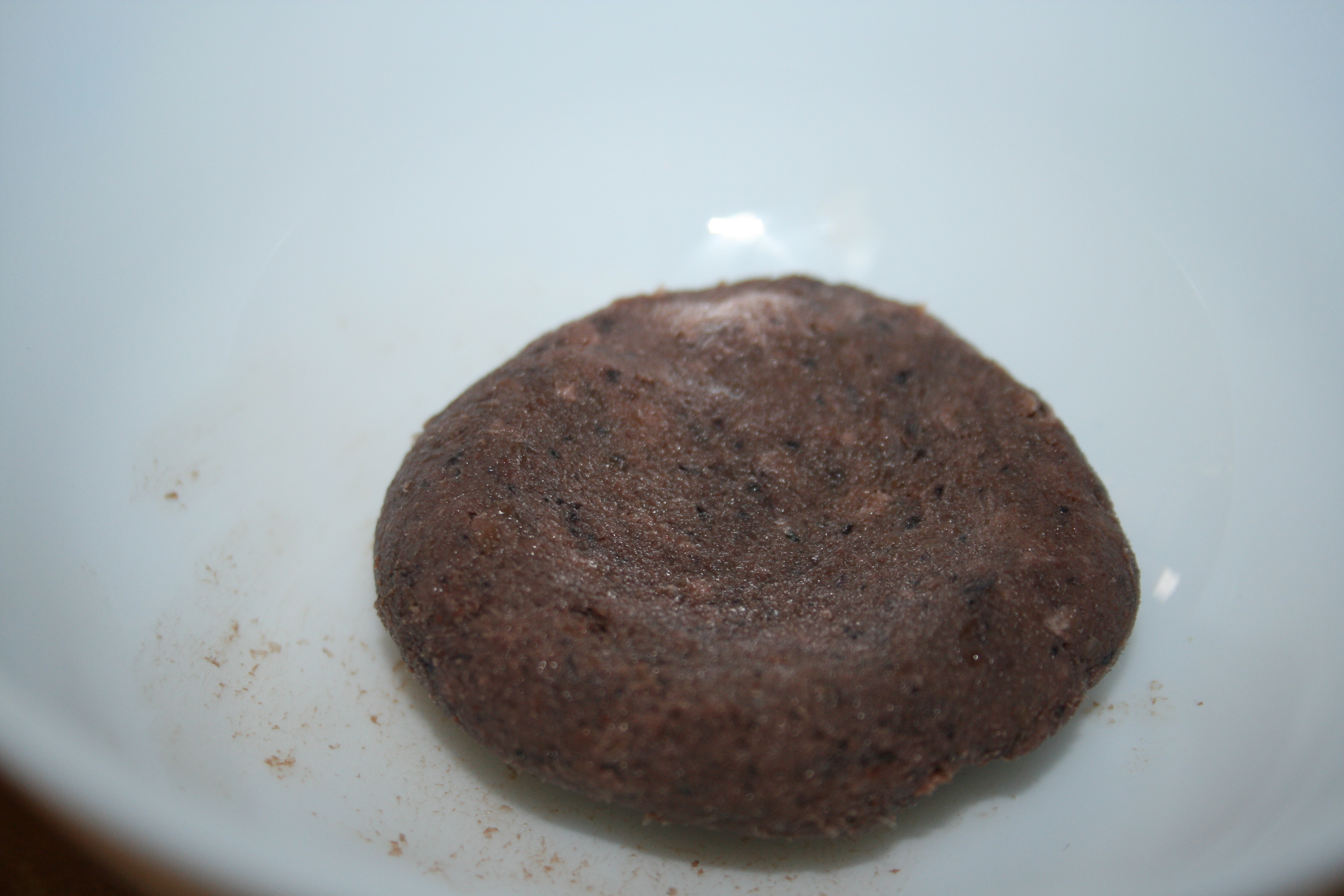
- Raw ngapi
- Alternative names: ငါးပိ
- Type: Paste
- Place of origin: Myanmar
- Associated cuisine: Burmese cuisine
- Main ingredients: Fish or shrimp
- Similar dishes: Ngachin, shrimp paste, belacan, pla ra, padaek, prahok, bagoong, shiokara

Ngapi (Burmese: ငါးပိ [ŋəpḭ], lit. 'pressed fish') is a pungent paste made of either fish or shrimp used in Burmese cuisine. Ngapi is typically made by fermenting fish or shrimp that is salted and ground then sundried. Like cheese, it can be distinguished based on main ingredient and regional origin. Ngapi can be distinguished by the type of fish used to make it. Ngapi can come from whole fish (such as ngapi kaung), from small fish (hmyin ngapi) or from prawns (seinza ngapi). Ngapi is a main ingredient of Lower Burmese cooking and is used as a condiment or additive in most dishes. Raw ngapi, with some exceptions, is not intended for direct consumption.

Similar fermented seafood pastes are common across the Southeast Asian cuisines, notably Malay belacan and Thai kapi and pla ra, Lao padaek, and Khmer prahok.

== Etymology ==
Ngapi is a compound word in the Burmese language, literally meaning "pressed fish". The Burmese term was borrowed into the Thai, Lao, and Khmer languages as "kapi", and now refers to shrimp paste, not fish paste, in those languages. However, in Bangladesh their shrimp paste is called "nappi". In addition, due to the Burmese migrants' introduction of ngapi in Mizoram, it is called "nghapih" using the Mizo orthography but refers to shrimp paste.

In English, ngapi was previously spelt in numerous ways, among them ngapee, nga-pee and gnapee.

== History ==
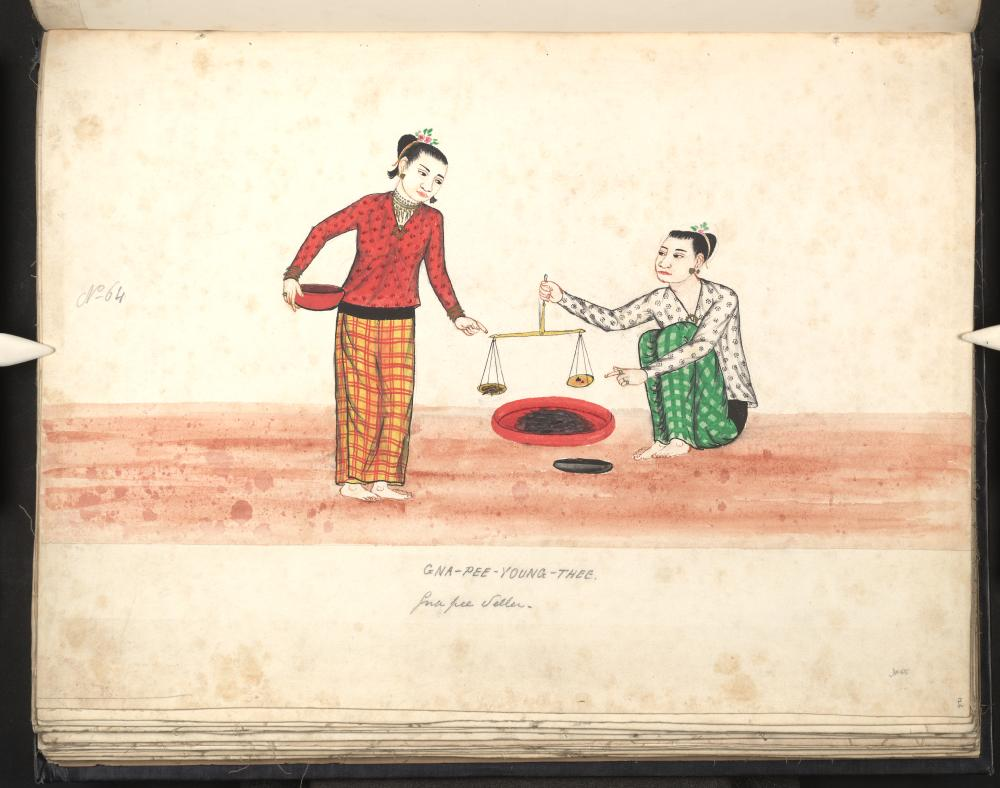
A 19th century Burmese watercolor depicting a ngapi hawker

Ngapi has a long history in Myanmar, as continental Southeast Asia has the widest variety of fermented fish products. The earliest extant record referencing "ngapi" is a Mon stone inscription dating to the 1st century CE. Ngapi makers are also listed in Burmese stone and marble inscriptions dating to 1100s to 1400s. The Mon established a trading pattern for ngapi by the 1400s, trading ngapi, salt, and rice in exchange for rubies, benzoin, and musk from the Bamars in Upper Myanmar. The trade of ngapi was economically significant in pre-colonial era, and was submitted as a tributary gift by Mon kingdoms to the Konbaung kingdom. In 1880, Pho Hlaing, a Konbaung era scholar, noted the purported health effects of ngapi, including enhanced diffusion and digestion of phlegm and bile in the Utubojanasaṅgaha treatise (ဥတုဗောဇနသင်္ဂဟကျမ်း). During British rule in Burma, European observers noted that the importance of ngapi in Burmese cuisine, and characterized its smell as "very self-offensive" and "offensive".

== Uses ==
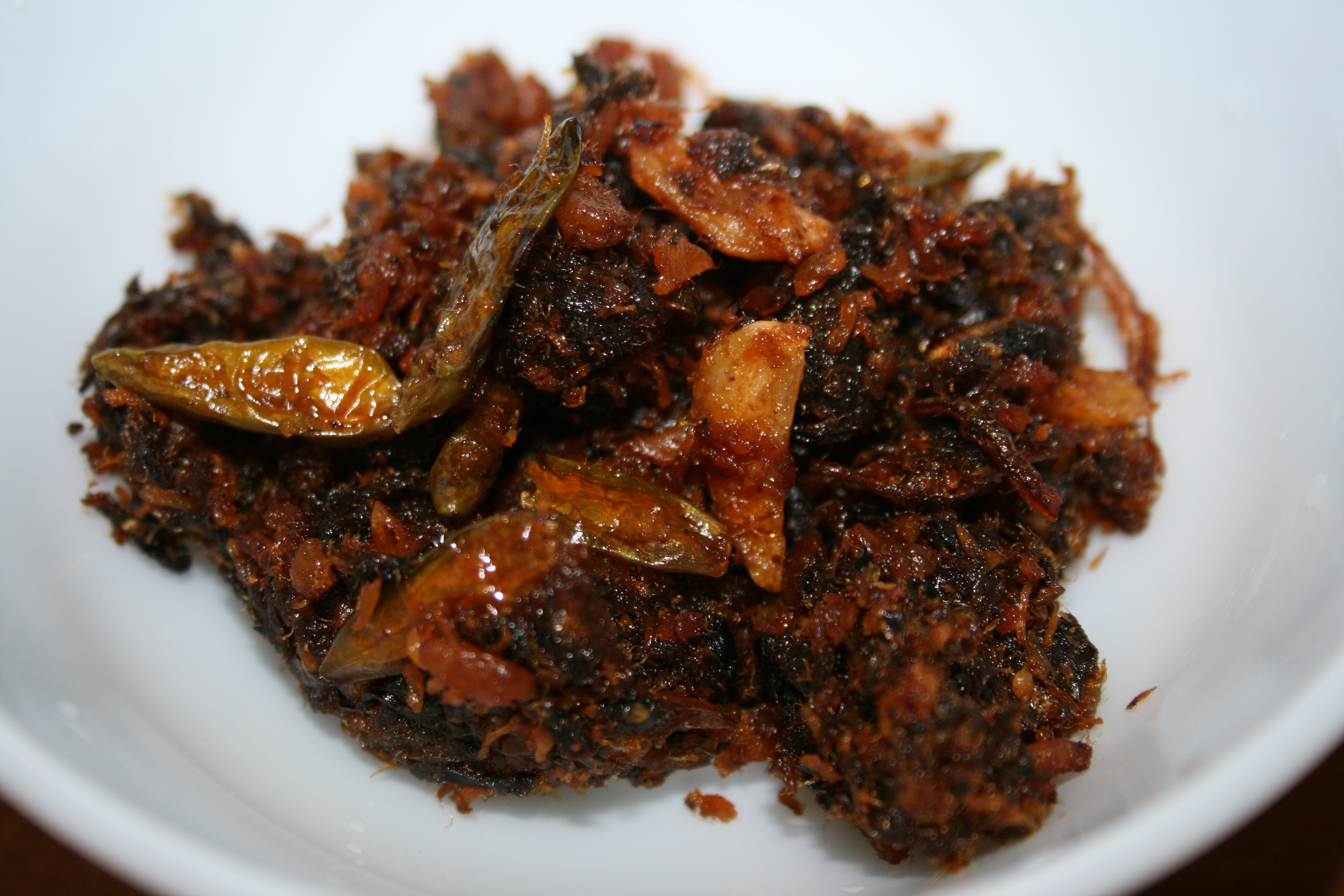
Homemade tamarind ngapi kyaw

Ngapi is a main ingredient of Lower Burmese cuisine from maritime coastal regions in the west and the south. It is not a main ingredient in traditional Upper Burmese (Burman, Shan, etc.) cuisines, although improved transportation in the modern era has helped increase ngapi's popularity in Upper Myanmar. It is used in a wide array of dishes and is eaten in myriad ways: it can be eaten on its own, such as baked or roasted ngapi, as a watery preparation called ngapi yay (ငါးပိရည် [ŋəpḭjè]), as a salad, as a pounded mixture with chili, or fried like balachaung. It is also used as a soup base and in main dishes.

== Regional variations ==
- Rakhine ngapi (ရခိုင်ငါးပိ) – The ngapi of Rakhine State contains very little salt or none at all. It mainly uses marine fish, in light of the Arakanese being a seafaring people. Rakhine ngapi is used as a soup base for the signature Rakhine dish, mont di (မုန့်တီ). Like other ngapi, it is widely used in cooking.
- In the Ayeyarwady and Tanintharyi divisions, the majority of ngapi is produced from freshwater fish. Ngapi usually contain a lot of added salt. This form of ngapi is more widely available in Myanmar and the Burmese population is more accustomed to the saltier ngapi than the Rakhine version. The ngapi from Myeik is very well known and is saltier than those from the region.

== Other ngapi dishes ==
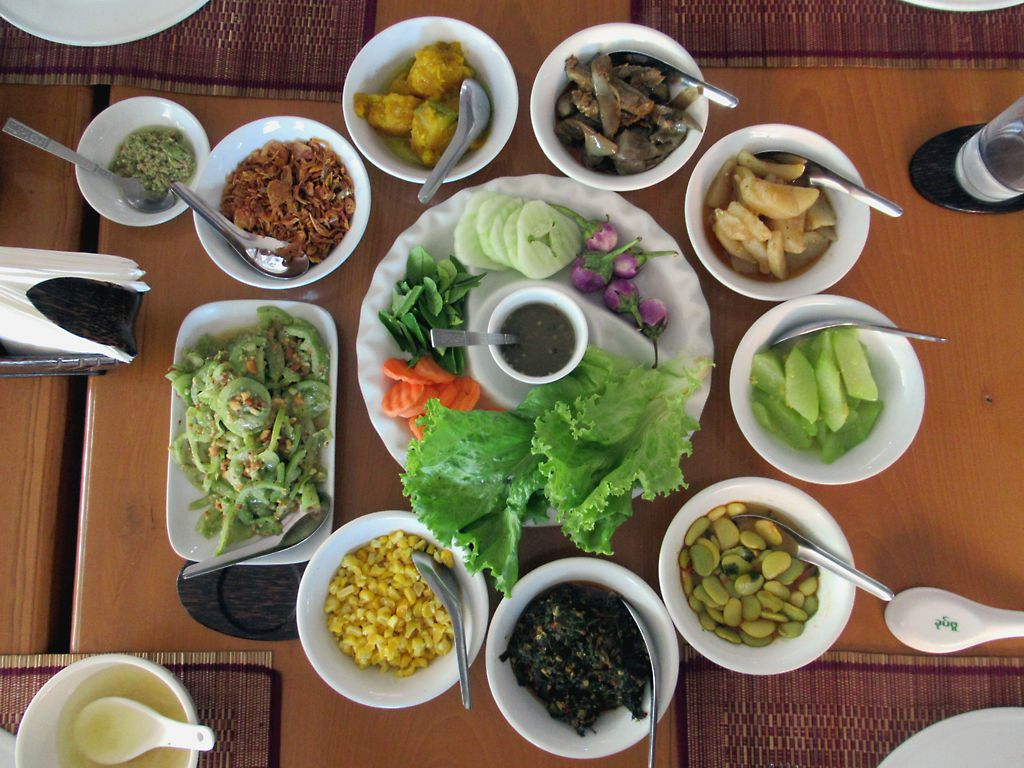
A plate of ngapi yay gyo is surrounded by an assortment of traditional Burmese curries and dishes.

The versatility of ngapi is reflected in the variety of methods the people of Myanmar have developed to consume ngapi.

- Seinza ngapi (စိမ်းစားငါးပိ) – a category of ngapi typically made with shrimp, that can be eaten raw
- Ngapi daung (ငါးပိထောင်း, pulverized ngapi) – the ngapi is baked or roasted in a frying pan without oil. Depending on the region and family preference, the ngapi is put in a stone mortar and is pounded with garlic and red or green chili.
- Ngapi yay (ငါးပိရည်, runny ngapi) – an essential part of Karen and Bamar cuisine. In the S'gaw Karen language, this is known as nya-u-htee (S'gaw Karen: ညၣ်အူထံ). The ngapi (either fish or shrimp, but mostly whole fish ngapi is used) is boiled with onions, tomato, garlic, pepper and other spices. The result is a greenish-grey broth-like sauce, which makes its way to every Burmese dining table. Fresh, raw or blanched vegetables and fruits (such as mint, cabbage, tomatoes, green mangoes, green apples, olives, chili, onions and garlic) are dipped into the ngapi yay and eaten, in a manner similar to Thai nam phrik, Indonesian lalab, and Malaysian ulam. Sometimes, in less affluent families, ngapi yay forms the main dish, and also the main source of protein.
- Ngapi thoke (ငါးပိသုပ်, ngapi salad) – a Burmese salad made with ngapi diluted in lime or lemon juice and mixed with chopped onions and chili.
- Ngapi gyet (ငါးပိချက်, cooked ngapi) – ngapi cooked with oil, and depending on the seasonal availability of fruits and vegetables, such as shallots, chilis, tomato, mango, chili, marian plum, tamarind, etc.
- Ngapi kyeik (ငါးပိကြိတ်, ground ngapi) – a Rakhine condiment where baked Rakhine ngapi is mixed with large green chili and garlic. It is also called ngayot kyeik (ground chili)
- Ngapi gaung (ငါးပိကောင်, whole ngapi fish) – a type of relatively dry fermented salted fish usually gutted with the head on. Usually deep fried and served with fried crushed dried red chillies and crushed garlic.
- Pè ngapi (ပဲငါးပိ), from the highland Shan States, ngapi is made instead from fermented soybeans also called pè bok or thua nao (in Shan). Although lacking fish or prawn products, it is called ngapi. Pè ngapi is used as both a flavoring and a condiment in Shan and Burmese cuisine. It may also be used to make a curry.
- Ngapi kyaw (ငါးပိကြော်; also ngapi gyaw, fried ngapi) – various types of ngapi that are fried with a wide variety of ingredients, mainly shredded shrimp flakes, onions, garlic and chili. The texture can range from jam-like to flossy (balachaung), and the flavour varies depending on an individual household, restaurant or monastery. Ngapi gyaw is almost always present in ahlus (almsgiving ceremonies) in Burmese monasteries. Some ngapi kyaw may not contain ngapi at all.

== Nutrition ==
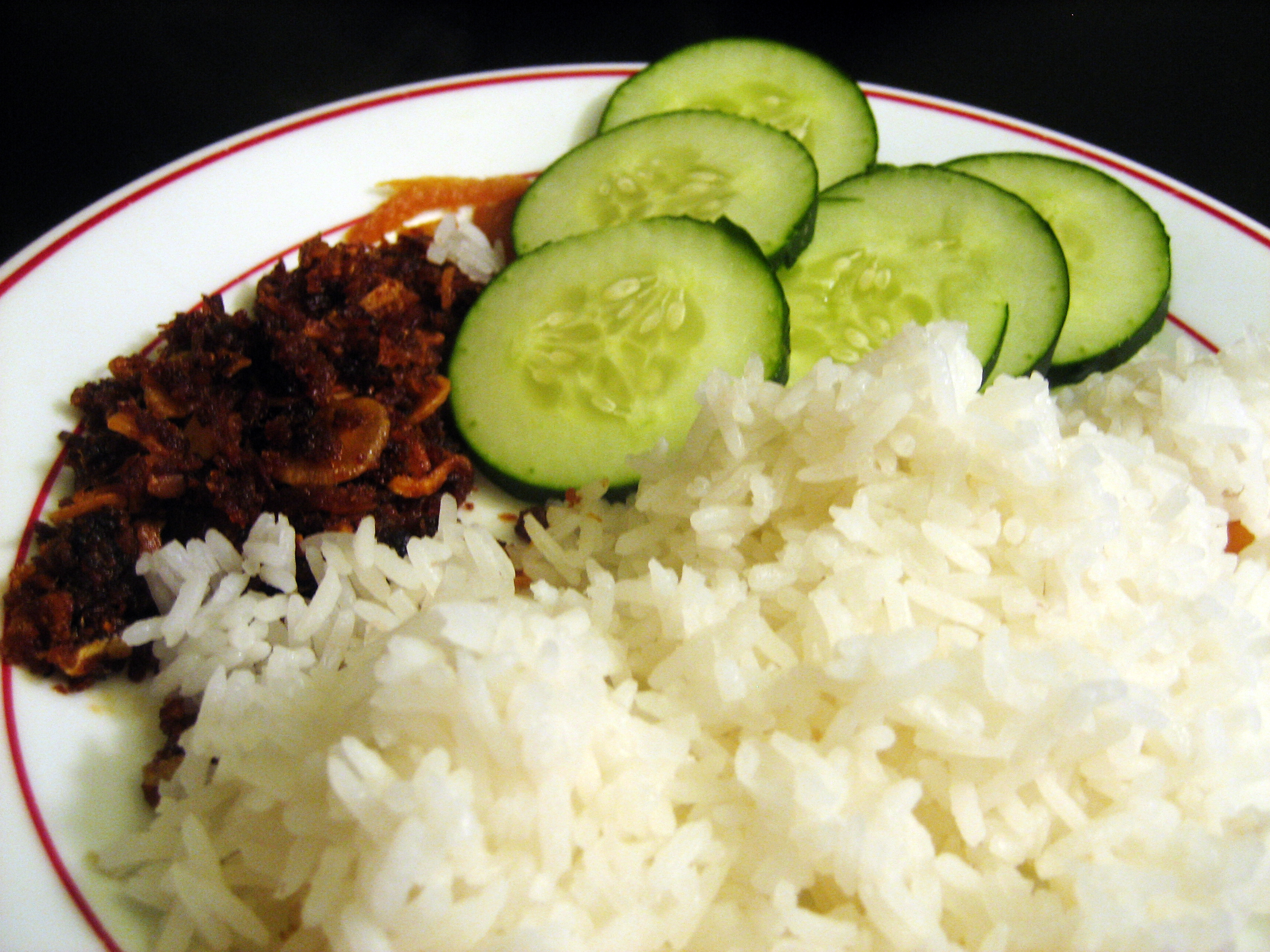
Ngapi kyaw with rice

As ngapi is made from fish, shrimp or beans, it is a source of protein. The ngapi made from marine fish and prawns also provide a source of iodine (which is abundant in all seafood): this may possibly be beneficial for those inland consumers whose diet may be iodine-deficient and who do not have access to iodized salt. Due to the high salt content which goes into the preparation, ngapi, like all salt-rich foods, should be consumed in moderation in patients with salt-sensitive hypertension.

== See also ==
- Cuisine of Burma
- Shrimp paste
- Prahok, Cambodian fish paste
- Bagoong, Filipino fish paste
