= Thanatpin Township =

Township in Bago Region, Myanmar

Coordinates: 17°17′34″N 96°33′34″E

- Township
- Location in Bago district
- Country: Myanmar
- Region: Bago Region
- District: Bago District
- Capital: Thanatpin

Population (2014)
  - Total: 145,287
- Time zone: UTC+6.30 (MMT)

Thanatpin Township is a township in Bago District in the Bago Region of Burma. The principal town is Thanatpin.
