= Kyaukkyi, Bago =

Kyaukkyi ကျောက်ကြီးမြို့ Kyaukgyi, Ledo
- Town
- Location in Burma
- Coordinates: 18°19′44″N 96°46′16″E
- Country: Myanmar
- Region: Bago Region
- District: Taungoo District
- Township: Kyaukkyi Township
- Time zone: UTC+6.30 (MST)

Kyaukkyi is a town in Kyaukkyi Township, Taungoo District, Bago Region in Myanmar. It is the administrative seat of Kyaukkyi Township. It is also known as Ledo (လယ်ဒိုမြို့)
