= Nyaungbintha, Ingapu =

Nyaung Pin Thar
- Location within Myanmar
- Coordinates: 17°42′19″N 95°09′22″E
- Country: Myanmar
- Region: Ayeyarwady Region
- District: Hinthada District
- Township: Ingapu Township
- Village Tract: kyatkhatkwin

Nyaung Pin Thar (Burmese: ညောင်ပင်သာ) is a village located in Ayeyarwady Region, Ingapu Township in Myanmar.
