= Nyo Nyo Thin =

Burmese lawyer and politician

Dr Nyo Nyo Thin MP
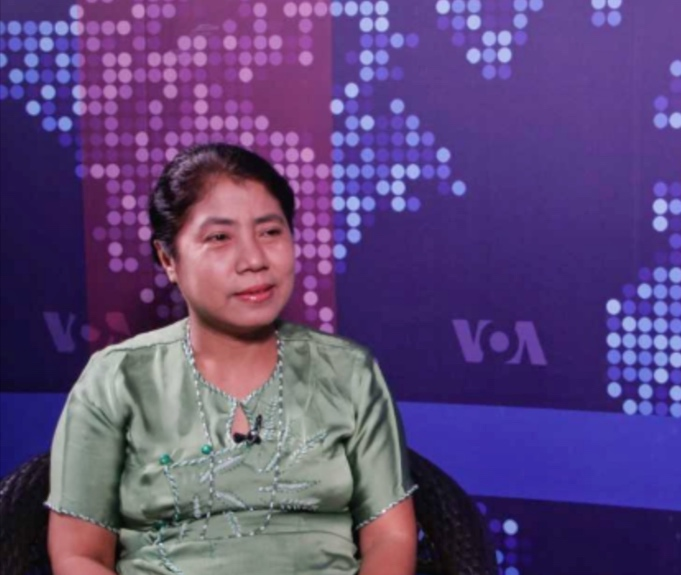

Member of the Yangon Region Hluttaw
- In office 31 January 2011 – 31 January 2016
- Constituency: Bahan Township No. 2

Personal details
- Born: 26 September 1967 (age 59) Yangon, Myanmar
- Party: Independent
- Education: Rangoon University; Yokohama National University; United Nations University
- Website: Nyo Nyo Thin on Facebook

Nyo Nyo Thin (Burmese: ညိုညိုသင်း; born 26 September 1967) is a Burmese lawyer and politician who previously served as a member of parliament in the Yangon Region Hluttaw for the Bahan Township No. 2 constituency. She is also a director of the organisation Yangon Watch, an independent organisation for government regulation.

== Early life and education ==
Nyo Nyo Thin was born on 26 September 1967 in Yangon, Myanmar. She enrolled at Rangoon University in 1983 and graduated with an LLM degree in 1997. She also graduated with a degree in Law from Yokohama National University in 2006.

She was awarded her doctorate in Law from Yokohama National University, and undertook postdoctoral studies within the Peace and Governance Program at Tokyo’s United Nations University.

== Political career ==
Nyo is a former member of the National League for Democracy. Later, she ran as an independent politician.

In the 2010 Myanmar general election, she contested the Bahan Township No. 2 constituency and won a Yangon Region Hluttaw seat.

She gained popularity for her outspoken critiques against the city’s lack of transparency about larger projects including the New Yangon City Development and the Dagon City Projects.

In 2015 Myanmar general election, she ran for a House of Representatives seat for the Bahan Township constituency, but lost to the National League for Democracy candidate.

== Publishing ==
Nyo Nyo Thin has published papers in many scholarly journals and is currently writing about the role of international assistance in promoting democracy and on access to gender justice.
