= Nyo Min Lu =

Burmese writer (born 1953)

- ညိုမင်းလူ
- Born: Tin Maung Tun; 12 October 1953 (age 72); Sagaing, Myanmar
- Education: B.V S
- Occupation: Writer
- Spouse: Mi Mi Thaw

Nyo Min Lu is a Burmese writer known for mostly writing short stories and translating others' work. He had written over 2000 articles and short novels.

== Early life and education ==
Nyo Min Lu was born in Sagaing Region on 14 October 1953 and raised by his father, Tin Tun and his mother, Daw Tin Nyunt. He was their only son.

== Career ==
He started as a business journalist working in the early 1990s for such magazines as Dana, Myanma Dana and Living Colour, with colleagues who included Sue Hnget, Nay Win Myint and Mg Ko Ko (Amarapura), writers who began their careers in business reporting.

== Literature awards ==
- Cats and Cats short novel (2001, The Htan Yaite Nyo literature Award)
- The Ngo Ya Thu (2007 Children's Literature Award in Kale)
- Yotekasoe, other short novels and collected short novel ( 2008 Taw Phyar Lay Literature Award)
- The Mekong Myanmar Literature Award 2015

== Personal life ==
On May 30, 2008, he married Mi Mi Thaw.
