= Nyaung Waing =

Village in Bago Region, Myanmar

Coordinates: 17°00′24″N 96°25′39″E

Nyaung Waing (Burmese: ညောင်ဝိုင်း) Village is a village in Kawa Township, Bago Region, Myanmar.
