= Kyaukkyi Township =

Kyaukkyi Township ကျောက်ကြီး မြို့နယ် Ledo Township
- Township
- Location in Nyaunglebin district

- Location in Myanmar
- Coordinates: 18°20′N 96°49′E
- Country: Myanmar
- Region: Bago Region
- District: Nyaunglebin District
- Capital: Kyaukkyi

Area
  - Total: 2,023.8 km^{2} (781.4 sq mi)

Population (2014)
  - Total: 113,329
  - Density: 55.9981223441/km^{2} (145.034471072/sq mi)
- Time zone: UTC+6.30 (MST)

Kyaukkyi Township (ကျောက်ကြီး မြို့နယ်; also called လယဒိုမြို့နယ်) is a township in Nyaunglebin District in the Bago Region of Burma (Myanmar). The principal town and administrative seat is Kyaukkyi. The township had a population of 113,329 as of 2014 and an area of 2,023.8 square kilometers, with a population density of about 56 people per square kilometer.

== History ==
Karen insurgents have held portions of the area since World War II. Insurgents were still active in the township as of 2007.

== Events ==
The Tatmadaw Light Infantry Battalion confiscated multiple plots of land and returned all but one. The land was near Mee Chaung Kone village. The same group started construction of an ill-advised road near Kaw Pyin village on February 16, 2017 to the chagrin of locals who were not asked beforehand. They specified it was for infrastructure development, but its use as a military stronghold is clear. The group later killed a villager at a gold mining site in March, the mining company proceeded to pay the family US$736 in compensation. A similar thing happened in May to an eight-year-old named Nan E whose family received the same amount in compensation, but from the Tatmadaw themselves. Many villagers felt unsafe because of the killings and requested the militia to withdraw from the area. Also in 2017, the Tha Pya Lar village tract stated that a newly built primary education school building constructed by the government was inadequate and reported it to higher offices.

== Demographics ==
The population was 113,329 in the 2014 official report. 47.9% of the population was male, whereas 52.1% were female. The median age was 22.8 years. There were 7 wards, 35 village tracts, and 22,883 privately owned households. 34% of households were headed by females and the average occupancy of a household was 4.9 persons. The majority of the population (58.6%) were between 15 and 64 years of age, with 36.2% being 14 or under and 5.2% being 65 or older. The sex ratio of males to females was 92 to 100. The literacy rate was 90.4%. 5.1% of people had a disability. Only 0.1% of people had a foreign passport, precisely 57. The unemployment rate (ages 15–64) was 5.9%. 49.6% of people used a bicycle for transport.
