= Moe Nyo =

Burmese painter

- Born: Moe Nyo; 1976 (age 49–50); Pwintbyu, Myanmar
- Education: University of Culture, Yangon (BA)

Moe Nyo (Burmese: မိုးညို; born 1973) is a Burmese painter. He uses his distinctive watercolour style in the Poem series to capture isolated corners of traditional architectural sites which are then offset with splashes of greenery. He is the Principal of Painting & Sculpture Department, State High School of Arts (Yangon).

== Biography ==
Moe Nyo was born in 1976 in Pwintbyu, Myanmar. He graduated with a B.A. in art from the University of Culture, Yangon in 1997, and a PGDA (Art) from the university. After graduation, he became a lecturer at the university. He is a member of Myanmar Artists Organization, Global Network of Watercolour Painters, and the International Watercolour Society of Myanmar.
