= Nyaunglebin =

Nyaunglebin ညောင်လေးပင်
- Town
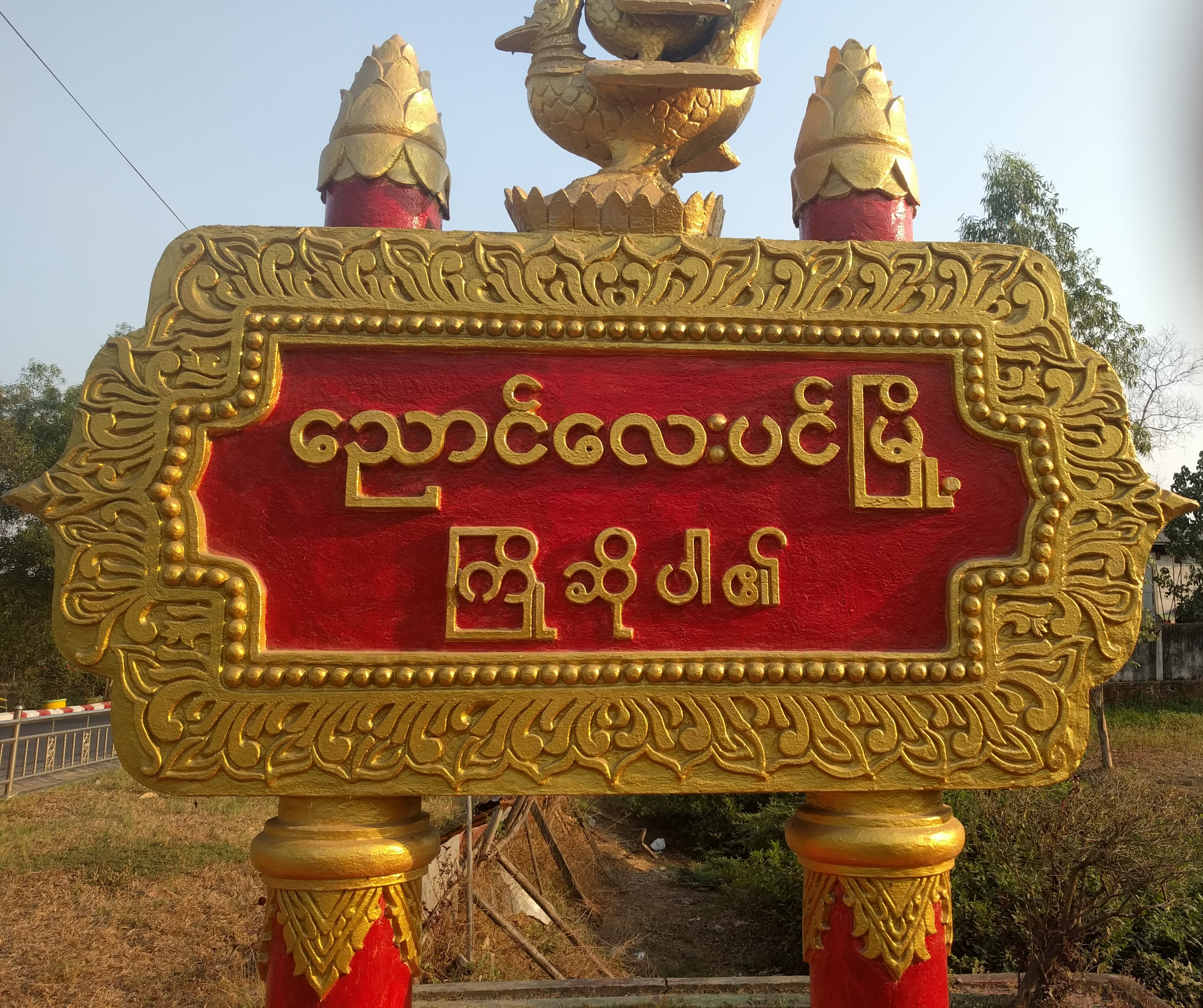

- Location in Myanmar
- Coordinates: 17°57′16″N 96°43′13″E
- Country: Myanmar
- Region: Bago Region
- District: Nyaunglebin District
- Township: Nyaunglebin Township

Population (2014)
  - Religions: Buddhism
- Time zone: UTC+6.30 (MST)

Nyaunglebin (Burmese: ညောင်လေးပင်) is the second largest city in the Nyaunglebin District of Bago Region. Nyaunglebin is not only the largest city in Bago District, but also the central city of the eastern part of the Bago Region. It is the fifth-largest city in the Bago Region overall and is located in the heart of eastern Bago.

The city is situated 82 miles (132 km) from Yangon, 48 miles (77 km) from Bago, 72 miles (116 km) from Taungoo, 120 miles (190 km) from Naypyidaw, and 332 miles (534 km) from Mandalay. Nyaunglebin Township consists of four towns—Nyaunglebin, Pyuntasa, Madauk, and Painzaloke—as well as numerous villages. The Yangon-Mandalay Expressway passes 15 miles (24 km) west of Nyaunglebin.

Nyaunglebin serves as a key transportation hub, where major railways and highways intersect. There are both highway and railway links from Nyaunglebin to Shwegyin Township. Nyaunglebin Railway Station is a significant stop on the Yangon–Mandalay Railway.

In 1883, the British colonial government built the first section of the Yangon–Taungoo railway line, beginning from Yangon and ending in Nyaunglebin. During the time of the Revolutionary Council government, Nyaunglebin was designated a "zone city" of Bago Region, comprising Kyauktaga (West Nyaunglebin), Daik-U, and Nyaunglebin townships.

In 2022, the State Administration Council established Nyaunglebin District, which includes five townships: Nyaunglebin, Daik-U, Kyauktaga, Shwegyin, and Kyaukkyi.
