= Nyaunglebin District =

Nyaunglebin District ညောင်လေးပင်ခရိုင်
- District
- Location in Bago region
- Coordinates: 17°57′N 96°43′E
- Country: Myanmar
- Region: Bago Region

Nyaunglebin District (Burmese: ညောင်လေးပင်ခရိုင်) is a district of the Bago Region in central Burma (Myanmar). Nyaunglebin Township is located in the district.

== Townships ==
Towhships in Nyaunglebin District Nyaunglebin Township Daik-U Township Kyaukkyi Township Shwegyin Township Kyauktaga Township

The district contains the following townships:

- Nyaunglebin Township
- Daik-U Township
- Kyaukkyi Township
- Shwegyin Township
- Kyauktaga Township
