= Bago District =

Coordinates: 17°44′N 96°36′E

Bago District ပဲခူးခရိုင်
- District
- Location in Bago region
- Country: Myanmar
- Region: Bago Region

Population (2014)
  - Total: 1,770,785

Bago District (Burmese: ပဲခူးခရိုင်) is a district of the Bago Region in central Burma (Myanmar). The region's capital, Bago, is located in the district. Bago District is bordered by Mon State to the southeast, Kayin State to the east, and Yangon Region to the southwest. The Bago Region districts of Taungoo and Tharrawaddy are located to the north and west of Bago District, respectively. Sittaung River runs through the district and empties into the Gulf of Martaban, which borders the Bago District townships of Thanatpin and Kawa.

== Townships ==
Townships in Bago District Bago Township Kawa Township Thanatpin Township Waw Township

The district contains the following townships:

- Bago Township, consisting mostly of the city of Bago
- Kawa Township
- Waw Township
- Thanatpin Township
