= Kawa Township =

Township in Bago Region, Myanmar

Coordinates: 17°05′19″N 96°27′35″E

- Township
- Location in Bago district
- Country: Myanmar
- Region: Bago Region
- District: Bago District
- Capital: Kawa

Population (2014)
  - Total: 197,363
- Time zone: UTC+6.30 (MST)

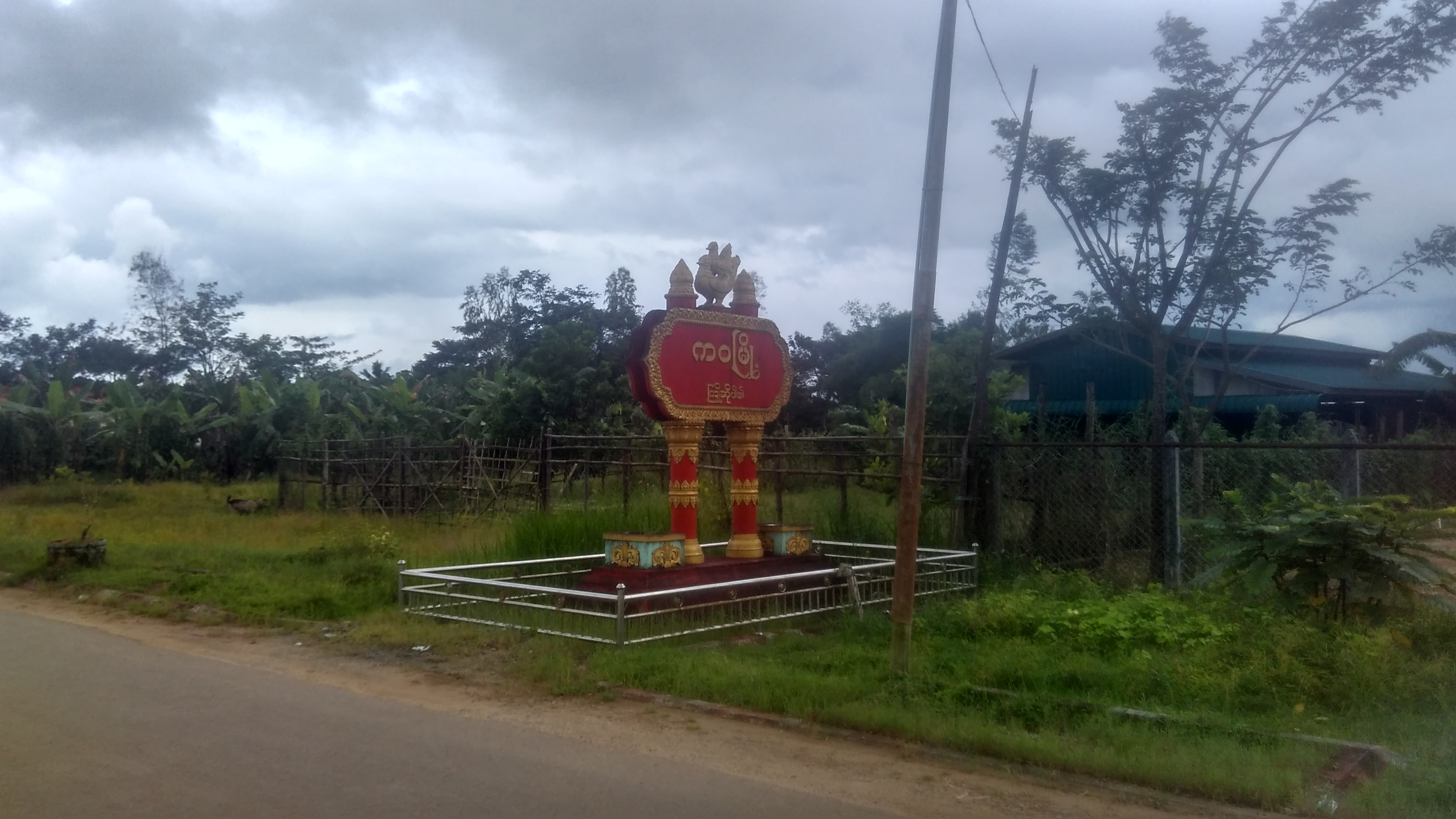
Kawa Township

Kawa Township (Burmese: ကဝမြို့နယ်). is a township in Bago District in the Bago Region of Myanmar. The principal town is Kawa. It is located in the east banner of Bago River and south of Bago. Kawa has 93 villages. Kawa is between Sittaung River and Bago river. The places near the river produce salts. The popular product of Kawa is Kawa Bag (Burmese: ကဝလွယ်အိတ်).

== Localities ==
- Hti Tan
- Mu Du
- Neik Ban
- Nyaung Waing
- Tha Pyay Kan
- Tan Man Gyi
