= Ahmar Subtownship =

Subtownship in Myanmar

Ahmar Subtownship အမာမြို့နယ်ခွဲ
- Subtownship
- Location in Pyapon district
- Coordinates: 15°49′N 95°28′E
- Country: Myanmar
- Region: Ayeyawady Region
- District: Pyapon District
- Township: Pyapon Township

Area
  - Total: 319.6 sq mi (827.8 km^{2})

Population (2014)
  - Total: 126,779
  - Density: 396.7/sq mi (153.2/km^{2})
- Time zone: UTC+6:30 (MST)

Ahmar Subtownship (Burmese: အမာမြို့နယ်ခွဲ) is a subtownship of Pyapon Township in Pyapon District, Ayeyarwady Region, Myanmar. The namesake of the subtownship is Ahmar, a small town of 3,859 people. The subtownship is coastal, bordering the Andaman Sea to its south, east and west. To its north, it borders Bogale Township and the other parts of Pyapon Township. It is located near the Meinmahla Kyun Wildlife Sanctuary.

== History ==
Ahmar Subtownship was initially part of Pyindre township. The town of Pyindre or Pyindaye was founded after the Second World War south of modern-day Ahmar but the town was soon overrun by the jungle and the township capital moved to Bogale. In 1971, the subtownship's area was divided off to form the new Pyapon Township.

In May 2024, during the current phase of the Myanmar civil war, the State Administration Council conscripted over forty men from over thirty villages in the subtownship by directly abducting the conscriptees from their homes, including a man who was hospitalised at the time due to poor health. This was a departure from standard lottery system practice and caused controversy within the subtownship.

== Geography ==
The subtownship is a coastal township susceptible to tsunamis. It also contains the Pyindaye Forest Reserve its north along the border with Bogale Township, comprising 99,686 acres. The Forest Reserve protects Burmese grape trees, climbing flat beans, nipa palms, Kyana and red mangroves and is also used as a logging source managed by the government. In addition, the Pyapon Township administration has been engaged in annual mangrove reforestation efforts since 2017 to protect the waterways and prevent coastal erosion in the subtownship's area. For instance, 20 acres of new mangrove trees were planted within the Pyindaye Forest Reserve territory along with conservation seminars provided to local residents in the nearby Ba Wa Thit village tract with the help of a corporate social responsibility program.

== Economy ==
The township has a labour shortage and rising labour costs due to stresses from out-migration. Low income, lack of healthcare and lack of educational opportunities push rural residents in the subtownship towards Pyapon or Hlaingthaya, Yangon's industrial suburb. The lack of off-season crops makes the already low agricultural income seasonal income, prompting many young adults to move to urban areas as they become jobless after the harvesting season. Most people within this rural community are poor, earning only about one US dollar a day from agriculture, nipa palm harvesting or fishing.

== In popular culture ==
The 2007 Burmese horror novel Pyindre Myanadi is set in the Pyindaye Forest Reserve within the subtownship.
