= Thein Swe =

Burmese politician

- သိန်းဆွေ

Member of the Amyotha Hluttaw
- Incumbent
- Assumed office 2 May 2012
- Preceded by: Myat Myat Ohn Khin
- Constituency: Ayeyarwady № 10

Personal details
- Born: 29 September 1967 (age 58) Pyapon, Burma
- Party: National League for Democracy
- Relations: Min Swe (father)
- Occupation: Politician

Thein Swe (Burmese: သိန်းဆွေ) is a Burmese politician and political prisoner who currently serves as an Amyotha Hluttaw member of parliament for Ayeyarwady Region Constituency № 10 (Dedaye and Pyapon Townships). His father Min Swe is a former MP elect, having won a majority of 20,358 (64% of the votes) in the 1990 Burmese general election.

== Political career ==
A member of the National League for Democracy, he was elected as an Amyotha Hluttaw MP and elected representative from Ayeyarwady Region' Constituency № 10 (Dedaye and Pyapon Townships).
