= Dedaye Bridge =

Bridge in Myanmar

- Coordinates: 16°24′48″N 95°53′25″E
- Carries: 2 lanes ( SB and NB ), 2 sidewalks (6 feet each [1.8 m])
- Crosses: Ayeyawady River
- Locale: Kungyangon Township in Yangon Division and Dedaye Township in Ayeyawady Division
- Official name: Dedaye Bridge
- Maintained by: Ministry of Construction, Union of Myanmar's Government

Characteristics
- Design: reinforced concrete piers, RCD bole piles and steel frame.
- Total length: 4,088.3 feet (1,246.1 m) long
- Width: 28 feet (8.5 m) wide and has 6-foot-wide (1.8 m) pedestrian lanes on both sides
- Height: 36 feet (11 m) high
- Load limit: 60-ton loads
- Clearance above: The clearance under the bridge is 36 feet (11 m) high and 350 feet (110 m) wide.

History
- Construction start: 10 June 2000
- Construction end: 23 March 2003
- Opened: 23 March 2003

Location
- Interactive map of Dedaye Bridge

Dedaye Bridge (Burmese: ဒေးဒရဲတံတား), also known as the Ayeyarwady-Dedaye Bridge, is a bridge linking Kungyangon Township in Yangon Division and Dedaye Township in Ayeyawady Division in southern Burma. It crosses the Ayeyawady River.

The construction of Dedaye Bridge across Toe River started on 10 June 2000. The bridge is equipped with reinforced concrete piers, RCD bole piles and steel frame. It is 4,088.3 feet (1,246.1 m) long and 28 feet (8.5 m) wide, and has six-foot-wide pedestrian lanes on both sides. The clearance under the bridge is 36 feet (11 m) high and 350 feet (110 m) wide. The bridge can bear 60-ton loads.

Dedaye Bridge was built by Public Works of the Ministry of Construction. the Dedaye Bridge linking Yangon and Ayeyawady Divisions was opened on 23 March 2003 7.30 am as a gesture of hailing the 58th Anniversary Armed Forces Day by member of the State Peace and Development Council Lt-Gen Thura Shwe Mann.

The opening ceremony of Dedaye Bridge was held at the pandal near the bridge in Kungyangon Township. The bridge with the length of over 4,000 feet (1,200 m) is part of the Yangon-Kungyangon-Dedaye-Pyapon-Kyaiklat-Maubin-Yangon Main road. With the use of the bridge, one can travel Pyapon-Kyunkadon-Seikma-Ahma trip, Pyapon-Bogale trip, Maubin-Nyaungdon-Pathein and Nyaungdon-Hinthada trips and Nyaungdon-Thandwe of Rakhine State trip.

It was built at a cost of Kyats 3,550 million and 1.6 million US dollars. The Dedaye Bridge was built in two years and nine months. Then, Lt-Gen Thura Shwe Mann and party posed for a documentary photo together with Deputy Superintending Engineer of Public Works U Khin Maung Win and officials in front of the archway.
