= Bogale Township =

Bogale Township ဘိုကလေးမြို့နယ် Bogalay Township
- Township
- World Food Programme provides humanitarian aid in Bogale Township after Cyclone Nargis, 2008

- Location in Pyapon district
- Coordinates: 16°05′N 95°24′E
- Country: Myanmar
- Region: Ayeyarwady Region
- District: Pyapon District
- Administrative seat: Bogale

Area
  - Total: 866.92 sq mi (2,245.3 km^{2})
- Elevation: 8.2 ft (2.5 m)

Population (2026)
  - Total: 330,129
  - Density: 380.81/sq mi (147.03/km^{2})
  - Ethnicities: Bamar; Karen
  - Religions: Buddhism; Christianity
- Time zone: UTC+6:30 (MMT)

Bogale Township (Burmese: ဘိုကလေးမြို့နယ် [bòɡəléɪ mjo̰nɛ̀], also spelt Bogalay Township) is a township in western Pyapon District in the Ayeyarwady Region of Myanmar. The principal town is Bogale.

Bogale Township is located in south-central Ayeyarwady Region and is bounded by the Bogale river distributary of the Irrawaddy River to the west with Labutta Township across the river. To the south lies the Andaman Sea and Ahmar Subtownship to the south. It is bounded by the rest of Pyapon Township to the east and Kyaiklat Township to the north. In the northwest, it is bordered by Mawlamyinegyun Township. As of March 2026, the township consisted of 1 town, divided into 10 urban wards, and 76 village tracts grouping together 575 villages.

In May 2008, the town of Bogale suffered heavily from Cyclone Nargis; 36,325 people were listed as dead or missing.

The Township is home to the Meinmahla Kyun Wildlife Sanctuary, which has a large amount of biodiversity and various mangrove species. It was also the second highest producer of rice in Myanmar by township in 2022's monsoon season.

== History ==
The area that is now Bogale Township was originally part of the historical Pyindre Township with many villages being described north of Ahmar. In the early 19th century, the site was a dense jungle with abundant prey. An Anglo-Burmese hunter named U Maung Kalay set up camp to hunt. To avoid each other's rifle fire, locals gathered near his camp and the area came to be known as Bogaleseik (Burmese: ဘိုကလေးဆိပ်, lit. 'Little Foreigner Port'). The town of Pyindre or Pyindaye was founded after the Second World War south of modern-day Ahmar but the town was soon overrun by the jungle and the township capital moved to Bogale.

In 1994, the Meinmahla Kyun Wildlife Sanctuary was established.

In October 1991, a Tatmadaw military patrol encountered Karen National Liberation Army (KNLA) soldiers infiltrating the township to foment an uprising. In what became known as the Bogalay Crisis within the broader Karen conflict, the military junta send a large amount of troops and committed human rights violations. The extent of their actions are contested. Eyewitness accounts describe collective punishment detentions, sexual assault, torture and the killing of 800-1000 civilians to crush the uprising. Official reports stated that 276 "enemy combatants" had been killed.

In May 2008, Cyclone Nargis hit Ayeyarwady Region, affecting 2.4 million people. 23,000 people were displaced in Bogale, and the township's hospital system remained functional. Bogale Township was one of the worst affected areas of the cyclone that hit the area. The disaster response from the military government was poor, with celebrity comedian and activist Zarganar stepping up to reach isolated villages in Bogale Township, among others. The government arrested him after one such relief trip to Bogale Township. Because of the Bogalay Crisis, the Myanmar Army maintained soldiers in predominantly Karen areas of the township as part of a larger pattern of repressive actions on cyclone-hit areas. In Bogale town, 95% of the homes are believed to have been destroyed by the tropical storm.

On 8 August 2008, two village tracts (Kadonkani and Ayeyar) from Pyapon Township were moved into Bogale Township.

== Geography ==
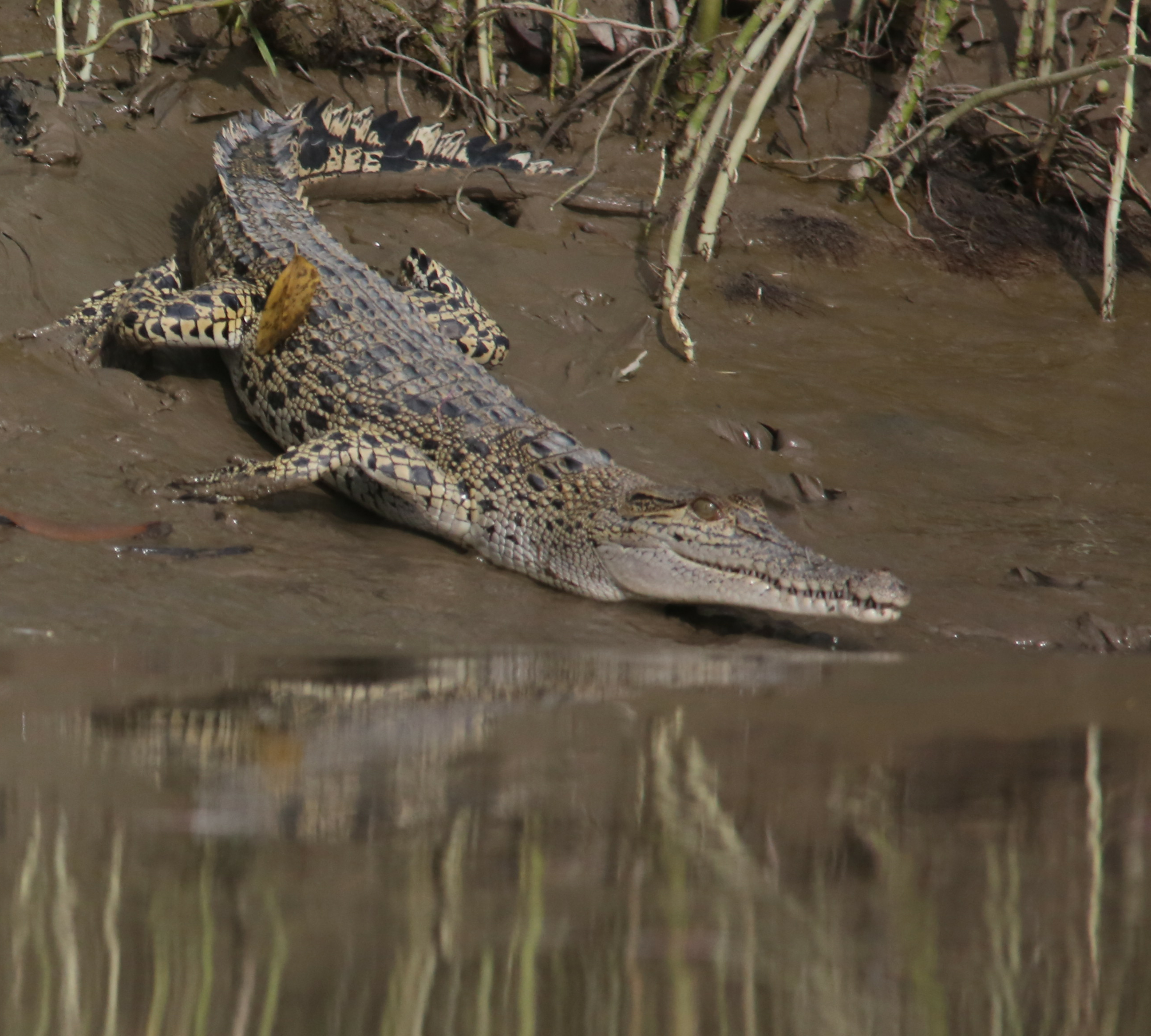
Saltwater crocodile at Meinmahlakyun Wildlife Sanctuary

Bogale Township is a largely flat township lying close to sea level in the Irrawaddy Delta in southwestern Myanmar. It is prone to flooding and disasters from its coastal location. From 2022 to 2026, The average year saw 113 days with 117.21 inches (297.7 cm) of rain and an high ranging between 35°C and 37°C and a low ranging between 18°C and 21°C. The climate is hot and tropical. The township's deltaic geography has many riverine channels and distributaries which retain distinct water masses. Seasonal deposition from further up the Irrawaddy River and from the Gulf of Mottama via the ocean affect the salinity and ecology of the area.

The township has 108,716 acres (439.96 km^{2}) of protected natural areas. It has a significant amount of mangrove forests with species including red mangroves, yellow mangroves, Indian mangroves, milky mangroves, and loop-root mangroves. Other tree species in the township include mangrove date palms, mangrove apple, mangrove trumpet, teak, coconut and Pacific maple trees. The township is very biodiverse, with an abundance of saltwater crocodiles, Irrawaddy dolphins as well as 38 amphibian species, 34 butterfly species, 112 fish species and 192 bird species- including several migratory birds. From 2025 to 2027, 18,305 acres (74.08 km^{2}) were reforested.

The township contains the Meinmahla Kyun Wildlife Sanctuary, which protects an ecosystem of mangrove forests, muddy forests and sandbanks. The sanctuary protects 52.78 square miles (136.7 km^{2}) and helps reduce saltwater intrusion from damaging the township's agricultural sector. In 2003, it was designated as an ASEAN Heritage Park and a Ramsar site in 2017.

== Demographics ==
Historical Population
Year	Bogale Township	±%
1973	230,623	—
1983	294,225	+27.6%
2014	322,665	+9.7%
2018	348,245	+7.9%
2019	346,242	−0.6%
2024*	270,077	−22.0%
2025	330,617	+22.4%
2026	330,129	−0.1%
(*Provisional census result); Source: Ministry of Labor, Immigration, and Population and General Administration Department data

Bogale Township is relatively rural with 85.7% of the town living outside the singular town of Bogale. The predominant religion is Buddhism, practiced by 95.0% of the population with the second largest religious group being Christians at 4.2%. As of the 2014 Myanmar census, 94.5% of the township's population relied on unimproved water sources, primarily from ponds and lakes for drinking and from the river for non-drinking uses. The median age was 25.4 years with a mean household size of 4.2 persons. By 2019, the mean household size increased to 4.3 persons. The mean household size within the rural portion only was lower than in the town. In 2026, the mean household size decreased to 3.8 persons.

The population of the township peaked at 348,245 in 2018 decreasing to 330,129 people as of 2026.

== Economy ==
The economy of Bogale Township is developing region in the Irrawaddy Delta with the primary industries being agriculture, animal husbandry and fishing. There is abundant navigable waterways and good overland transportation infrastructure. The major roadway connects Bogale Township to Yangon, the primary market for rice, the primary crop of the township. In the 2022 season, Bogale Township was second only to its neigbour Labutta Township in volume of rice produced. The township produced 8.7% of the Myanmar moonsoon season's rice. The most common crop by far is rice with a very small sunflower and seasame industry. The primary plantation crops are coconut, betel nut and nipa palms. The township has no combine harvesters. There is a signifcant poultry industry for both chicken and duck, as well as a lot of pig farms. Duck farming is conducted in tandem with rice farming for more efficient yields. Shrimp makes up an additionally significant part of the township's economy. There is little heavy industry in the township.

After the 2008 Cyclone Nargis, the yield of summer rice fell by 22.75% and monsoon rice by 43.75%. NGO partners and climate researchers implemented programmes to demonstrate more efficient and sustainable farming in the township, including establishing Ma Sein village as a climate smart village.

In 2026, the recently formed Ministry of Cooperatives and Rural Development invested into a 500 feet (150 m) long road in Kyunkalay village.

== Notable people ==
- Journal Kyaw Ma Ma Lay - 20th century writer, born in Kamar Kalu village

== List of Village Tracts ==
The following are Bogale Township's 76 village tracts in the township, which group together 575 legally recognised villages as of 2026.

- Auk Hle Seik
- Aye
- Aye Yar
- Boe Di Kwe
- Boe Yaung
- Byu Sa Khan
- Chaung Bye Gyi
- Chaung Gyi Wa
- Chaung Hpyar (Nyi Naung)
- Daunt Gyi
- Ga Yan
- Haing Si
- Hay Man
- Hlwa Htaung Su
- Hpa Yar Chaung
- Hpa Yar Thone Su
- Hpoe Lay
- Htaw Paing
- Ka Don Ka Ni
- Ka Ma Ka Lu
- Kan Gyi
- Kan Su (East)
- Kan Su (West)
- Kha Naung
- Ku Lar Ohn Pin Su
- Kun Pin
- Kwin Gyi
- Kwin Pone Gyi
- Kyein Chaung Gyi
- Kyon Hpar
- Kyon Sa Lu
- Kyun Hteik (Kyun Nyo Gyi)
- Kyun Thar Yar
- Lin Taing
- Ma Gu
- Ma Lawt
- Ma Yeit Ywar Thit
- Min Gan
- Mya Thein Tan
- Myin Ka Kone
- Nga Pi Chaung
- Nga Pyay Ma
- Nyi Naung (Hay Man)
- Nyi Naung Wa
- Pa Da Myar Kone
- Pa Wein
- Paik Sa Lat
- Pan Be Su
- Paung Htei
- Pet Pye
- Pyin Boe Gyi
- Pyin Ma Kone
- Sa Bai Kone
- Sa Khan Gyi
- Sat Kyun
- Sein Haing
- Set San
- Su Pa Daung Kone
- Tha Byu Kone
- Tha Kan Wa
- Tha Pyay Kan
- Tha Yaw Chaung
- Tha Zin Kone
- Tha Zin Ngu
- Than Laik
- Thar Paung
- Thet Kei Seik
- Thit Hpyu Chaung (Kan Su)
- Thit To Chaung
- Thone Htat
- Thu Zar Wa
- Tone Le
- Wea Gyi
- Yae Kyaw Toe
- Yoke Saing
- Ywar Thit
