= Kyaiklat Township =

Kyaiklat Township ကျိုက်လတ်မြို့နယ်
- Township
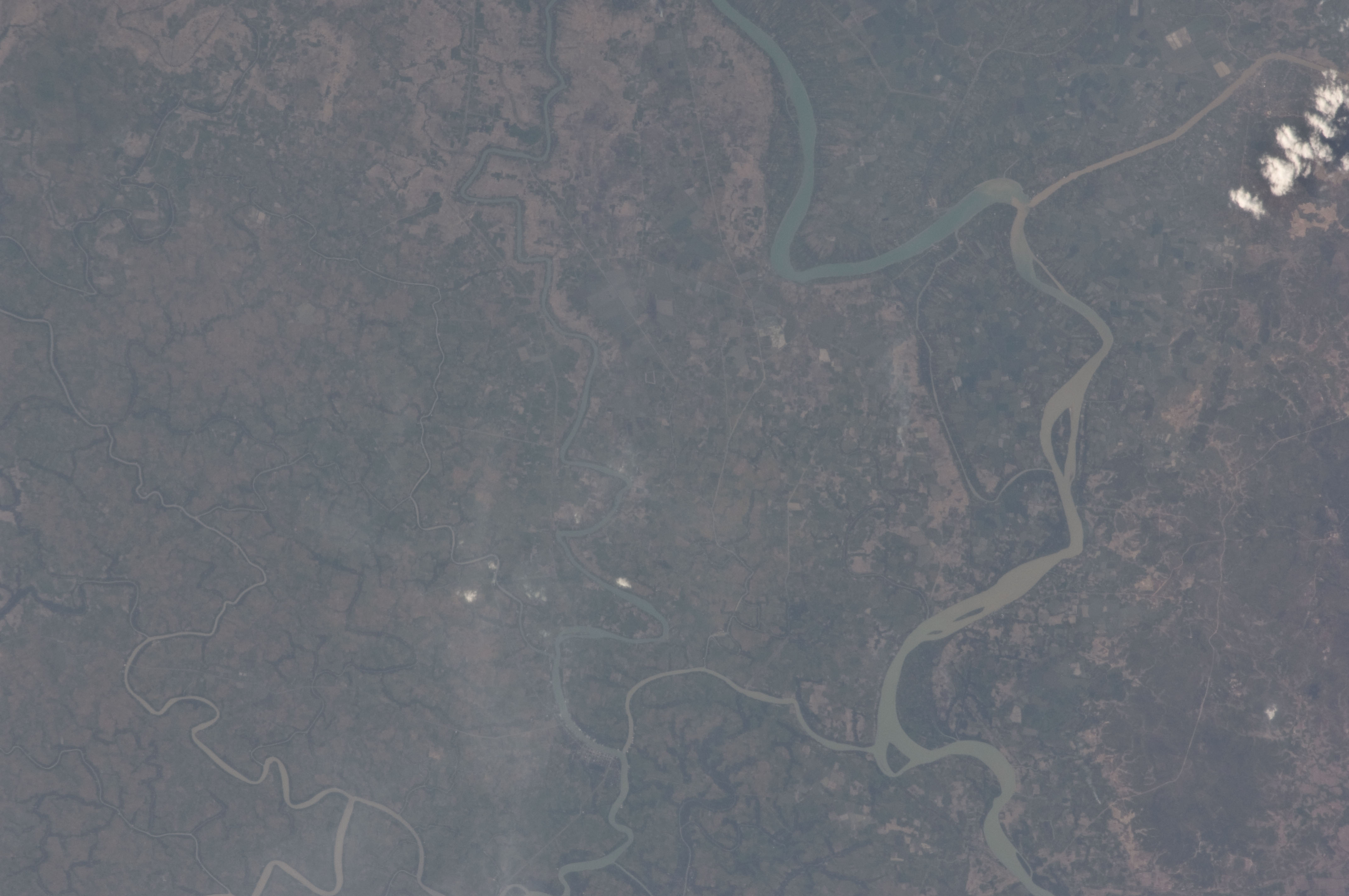
- View of Kyaiklat Township from the International Space Station

- Location in Pyapon district
- Coordinates: 16.4431°N 95.7142°E
- Country: Myanmar
- Region: Ayeyarwady Region
- District: Pyapon District
- Capital: Kyaiklat

Area
  - Total: 274.31 sq mi (710.5 km^{2})
- Elevation: 16.35 ft (4.98 m)

Population (2019)
  - Total: 196,102
  - Density: 714.89/sq mi (276.02/km^{2})
  - Ethnicities: Bamar; Karen
  - Religions: Buddhism; Christianity
- Time zone: UTC+6:30 (MMT)

Kyaiklat Township (Burmese: ကျိုက်လတ်မြို့နယ်) is a township of Pyapon District in southeastern Ayeyarwady Region in lower Myanmar.

The township has one town, the principal town of Kyaiklat, which is divided into 6 urban wards. The remainder of the township is divided into 87 village tracts grouping together 421 villages. The township borders Maubin Township to the north and is bounded by the main stream channel of the Irrawaddy River to the west, separating it from Wakema Township. To its south, it borders four townships- Mawlamyinegyun, Bogale, Pyapon and Dedaye townships going from west to east. The township has a short border with the Toe River in the east, bordering the Yangon Region township of Kawhmu across it.

The township is relatively new, being formed in 1903. The township's primary industry is rice agriculture, with its inland position still remaining threatened by saltwater intrusion events, hastened by climate change.

== History ==
The town of Kyaiklat was settled in the 1840s by Mon refugees fleeing war further east. The name of the town comes from a Mon phrase "Kyaik Lwoik" (Burmese: ကျိုက်လွိုက်) meaning Pagoda Toppled, because stupas that the Mon settlers built in the town were destroyed by erosion and flood damage. After the Third Anglo-Burmese War, in 1887, the town was incorporated within the Thongwa District. By 1893, Myaungmya District was formed from the Thongwa District, and by 1903, Pyapon District was formed from the Myaungmya District.

In 1903, Kyaiklat Township was made to be part of the Pyapon District instead of the Maubin District. During the reorganisation 22 villages from Kyaiklat Township were transferred to Maubin Township. When Kyaiklat township was formed, it included what is now Dedaye Township as well. By 1932, the township had a significant population of Chinese people who were reported, along with the native Burmese, to have high levels of tuberculosis from opium usage.

In 2022, during the Myanmar civil war, 10 people in Kyaiklat Township were arrested for having photos of opposition leader Aung San Suu Kyi onto their mobile phones.

== Physical Geography ==
The township lies in the flat low-lying Irrawaddy Delta and has many waterways and deltaic islands. The main Irrawaddy River forms its far western boundary with its other distributaries forming the major Kyaiklat River within the township. The various freshwater waterways are navigable year-round. The climate is hot and humid, with the township receiving an average of 141.3 days of rain and 107.3 inches of annual rainfall between 2016 and 2019. Over the same time period, the average high was 37.5°C and average low was 18.8°C.

The township has waterways with importance to deltaic tidal ecoystems. Flora in the township include lebbeck, red mangrove and mango trees as well as betel nut and nipa palms. Flood risk is high in the township and the township suffered from significant natural disasters in 2006, 2008 and 2012. The township's mangroves were largely deforested in the 1980s, with some remaining mangroves being either degraded ecosystems or having been deforested in the 2000s.

== Demographics ==
Historical population
Year	Mawlamyinegyun Township	±%
1973	122,954	—
1983	145,849	+18.6%
2014	193,340	+32.6%
2018	195,052	+0.9%
2019	196,102	+0.5%

The township is largely rural with 87.7% of the population in 2019 living outside the singular urban area of the town of Kyaiklat. According to the 2014 Myanmar census, the township had a median age of 26.7 years and a labour force participation rate of 63.4%, with a dependency ratio of 57.6. 95.2% of the population got drinking water from ponds, lakes, rivers and other natural freshwater bodies with only 81.4% of the population having access to either a water seal pit latrine or a flush toilet. The township only had an electrification rate of 8.8% and only 702 people relied on it as their main source of energy for cooking. In 2024, the Ministry of Cooperatives and Rural Development installed solar street lighting in Lintun village, Kyaiklat as part of a broader Bright Green Development initiative to improve the standard of living in rural Myanmar.

As of 2019, the township was 91.2% Bamar with 8.1% Karen people making up the largest minority. The predominant religion is Buddhism followed by 91.0% of the township with Christianity coming second at 8.4% of the population. In 2026, the township had 1,338 students taking the basic education high school matriculation exam.

== Economy ==
Kyaiklat Township is a developing economy whose primary industry is agriculture. Rice is, by far, the main crop with 22 million tin (roughly 240 million gallons) of rice produced during the 2018-2019 season. The main secondary crops are sweet corn and black matpe, with a significant coconut and betel nut plantation industry. The township overall has 23 combine harvesters and 1073 acres of fisheries. Both heavy industry factories located in the township process rice for export to nearby markets like Yangon. Farmers in rural Kyaiklat Township received agricultural loan distributions during the Covid-19 pandemic to ensure national food security.

Sea level rise threatens the township's agricultural land through saltwater intrusion, especially during storm surges. During 2014's salt intrusion floods, Kyaiklat ened up with about 40% of Pyapon District's freshwater area despite its smaller total land area due to its location further inland. Still, about 50,000 hectares of rice production areas were affected by flooding in Kyaiklat.

== List of Village Tracts ==
The following are Kyaiklat Township's 87 village tracts in the township, which group together 422 villages recognised by the Myanmar Information Management Unit as of 2024.

- Ah Htet Sin Ku
- Ah Hu
- Ah Shey Sin Ku
- Auk Sin Ku
- Ba Li Chan
- Boe Lu Wa
- Bon Da Yeik
- Bon Lon Chaung
- Da Yin Kauk
- Dar Na Chaung
- Daunt Gyi
- Dawbon
- Dawei Hmaing
- Ein Yar Gyi
- Hlaing Tar
- Hle Seik
- Hpaung Yoe Chaung
- Hpaung Yoe Seik
- Hta Yaw Ywar Thit
- Htein Kyun
- Ka Lat Yat
- Ka Nyin Chaung Kyon Hpar
- Ka Nyin Kaing
- Ka Nyin Kone
- Ka Taik
- Kaing Chaung
- Kha Naung
- Kun Pa Laing
- Kun Pa Laing Ywar Thit
- Kwin Chaung Gyi
- Kya Khat Kone
- Kyan Khin Pa Be Su
- Kyan Khin Su
- Kyar Kaik (Let Khoke)
- Kyaung Su
- Kyee Chaung
- Kyon Hpar Yae Kyaw
- Kyon Ka Lut
- Kyon Kyaik
- Kyon La Mu
- Kyon Ma Ngay Ah Su Gyi
- Kyon Ma Ngeit
- Kyon Thi Wa
- Kyon Tone Let Pan
- Kyon Tone Ta Man
- Kywe Ku Kha Yar Yoe
- Kywe Ta Lin
- La Tar Gyi
- Lay Ein Tan
- Lay Lan Pin
- Lin Tun
- Ma Yan Gyi
- Ma Yan Ka Lay
- Me Za Li Kone
- Meik Tha Lin
- Myanmar Kayin Su
- Nat Sin Kyaung Su
- Nat Sin Wa
- Nga Pi Chaung
- Nga Pway Tan Sar Hpyu
- Ngwe Inn Su
- Ohn Pin Su
- Pa Yaik Kyan Khin
- Pa Yaik Wa
- Pan Be Su
- Pay Chaung
- Pe Kho Su
- Sar Hpo Thaing Chaung
- Sin Tar
- Sit Kone
- Su Ga Nan
- Ta Boe Kone
- Ta Man Gyi
- Ta Nyi
- Ta Pay Ta Mawt
- Tar Pat
- Taung Boet Gyi
- Teit Teit Ku
- Tha Byu Seik
- Tha Met Pyay Wa
- Tha Pyay Chaung
- Tha Pyay Tan
- Thar Yar Kone
- Thar Yar Wea
- Tone Hle Ah Hta Nee
- War Kauk
- Yone Daunt
