= Ahmar, Myanmar =

Town in pyapon township

Ahmar အမာမြို့
- Town
- Location within Myanmar
- Coordinates: 15°48′N 95°17′E
- Country: Myanmar
- State: Ayeyarwady Region
- District: Pyapon District
- Township: Pyapon Township
- Subtownship: Ahmar Subtownship

Area
  - Total: 1.08 sq mi (2.79 km^{2})

Population (2019)
  - Total: 3,859
  - Density: 3,580/sq mi (1,380/km^{2})
- Time zone: UTC+6.30 (Myanmar Standard Time)

Ahmar (Burmese: အမာမြို့) is a town in Pyapon Township, Ayeyarwady Region, Myanmar near the Andaman Sea coast. It is located within Ahmar Subtownship, an unofficial designation used for statistical and administrative ease. It is located near the Meinmahla Kyun Wildlife Sanctuary.

Most people within this rural community are poor, earning only about one US dollar a day from agriculture, nipa palm harvesting or fishing.
