= Pyapon Township =

Pyapon Township ဖျာပုံမြို့နယ်
- Township
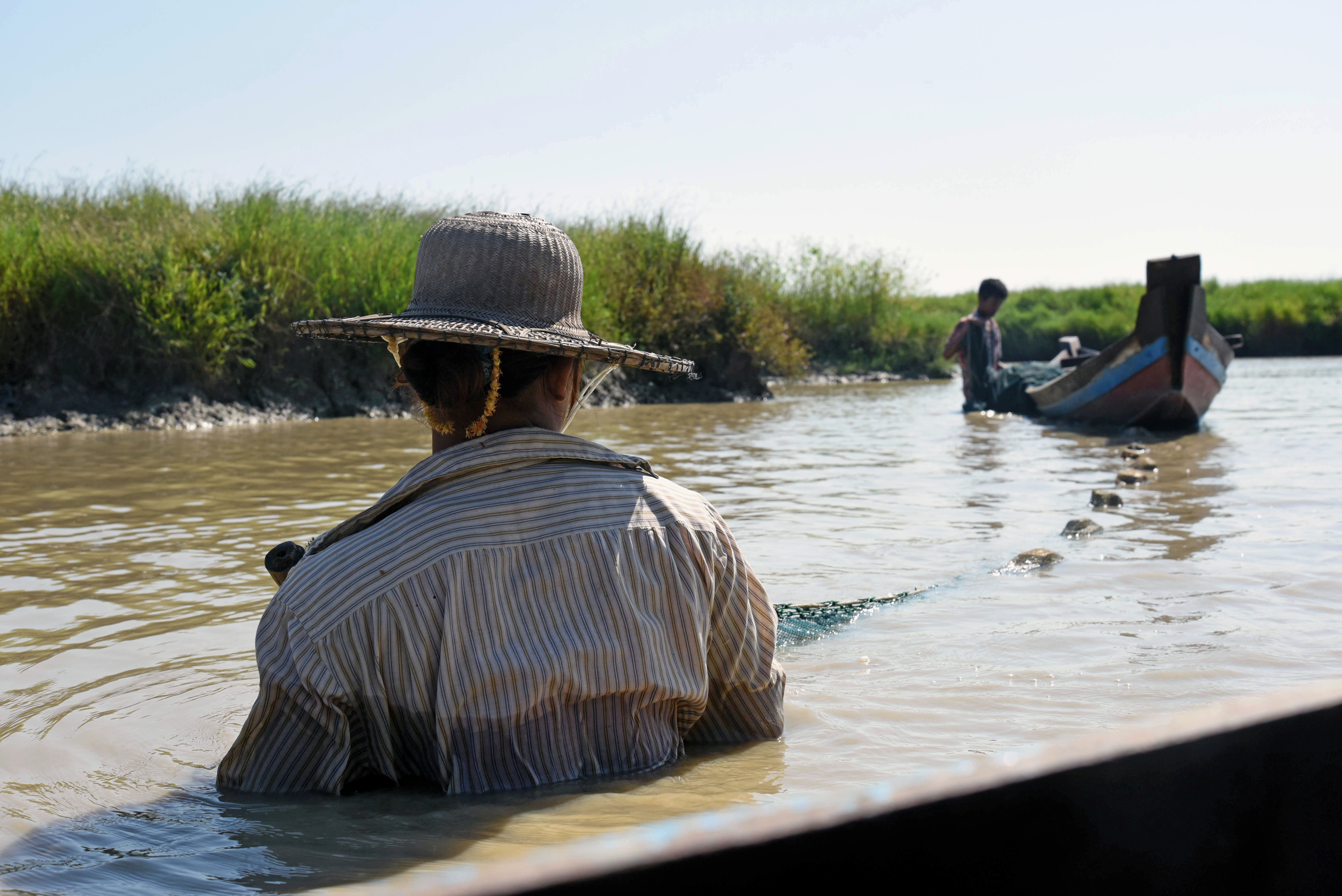
- People fishing in Kyonkadun, Pyapon Township

- Location in Pyapon district
- Coordinates: 16°10′N 95°40′E
- Country: Myanmar
- Region: Ayeyawady Region
- District: Pyapon District
- Capital: Pyapon

Area
  - Total: 587.33 sq mi (1,521.17 km^{2})
- Elevation: 8.2 ft (2.5 m)

Population (2019)
  - Total: 309,065
  - Density: 526.223/sq mi (203.176/km^{2})
  - Ethnicities: Bamar
- Time zone: UTC+6:30 (MST)

Pyapon Township (Burmese: ဖျာပုံမြို့နယ်) is a township of Pyapon District in the Ayeyarwady Region of Myanmar. The principal town and administrative seat of the district is Pyapon. The southern portion of the township includes Ahmar Subtownship, an unofficial division used by the Township for statistical and administrative ease.

Pyapon Township is located in south-central Ayeyarwady Region bordering the Andaman Sea to its south and west. Its northwestern boundary is concave and borders Bogale Township. To its northeast, it borders Kyaiklat Township and Dedaye Township all within Pyapon District. The township consists of two towns with a total of 23 wards between them as well as 52 village tracts and 212 villages.

== Geography ==
Pyapon Township is located on the furthest shores of the Irrawaddy Delta and is dominated by mangrove forests and farmlands. These forests contain Burmese grape trees, red mangroves, Indian magroves, sea holly mangroves, nipa palms, mangrove date palms and coastal bamboo plants. The township has 99,686 acres (403.41 km^{2}) of protected lands. Inland Pyapon Township sees few settled forests, with non-agricultural lands are grassy areas used for grazing. The Mangrove areas are being degraded due to overexploitation of resources and habitat destruction for agricultural or fish-pond land use.

The township has several waterways, including the Pyapon River, Gonnyindan River and Bogale River among many smaller freshwater streams. sandbanks impede deep-ocean vessels from entering most waterways within the township. Pyapon Township is a hot and humid region with temperatures ranging, on average, between 18°C and 36°C. Between 2016 and 2019, the average year saw 121 days of rain with an average rainfall of 121.35 inches (308.22 cm) per year.

== Demographics ==
Historical Population
Year	Pyapon Township	±%
2014	314,122	—
2018	302,246	−3.8%
2019	306,105	+1.3%
2022	309,594	+1.1%
2023	309,065	−0.2%
Source: Ministry of Labor, Immigration, and Population and General Administration Department data

Pyapon Township is relatively rural with 83.2% of the population in 2019 living outside of Pyapon and Ahmar. The predominant religion is Buddhism, practiced by 95.5% of the population with the second largest religious group being Christians at 3.8%. The median age in the eastern portion of the town is 26.9 years with a mean household size of 4.4 persons. In the western Ahmar subtownship, the median age is 22.3 years with a mean household size of 4.5 persons.

== Economy ==
The economy of Pyapon Township is experience slow growth and development with the primary industries being agriculture and fishing. There is abundant navigable waterways and good overland transportation infrastructure. The major roadway connects Pyapon to Dala and Hlaingthaya, Yangon Region. The most common crop by far is rice with a very small amount of off-season winter crops. The township also sees a labour shortage and rising labour costs due to stresses from out-migration. Low income, lack of healthcare and lack of educational opportunities push rural residents in Ahmar Subtownship towards Pyapon or Hlaingthaya. The lack of off-season crops makes the already low agricultural income seasonal income, prompting many young adults to move to urban areas as they become jobless after the harvesting season. In recent years, the township has been experiencing increased salinity, particularly after Cyclone Nargis struck Pyapon and exacerbated coastal flooding. 85% of farms in the township faced salinity problems and decreasing farm yields. Traditional farming adaptations are longer effective, and technology is still limited within the agricultural sector.

There is also a dairy industry within the township alongside the raising of various farm animals. The township has over two thousand farm produce processors. The town of Pyapon serves as a center for collecting rice from the surrounding agricultural areas, and is home to a diesel-run power plant, using equipment by the German firm Siemens.

The townships many freshwater fisheries, mostly for shrimp. The majority of the fish produce is caught freshwater fish. The fish fauna is diverse and abundant within the township's freshwater, brackish and marine ecosystems. The most common fish caught are in the order Perciformes.

== List of Village Tracts ==
The following are Pyapon Township's 52 village tracts in the township, which group together 295 recognised villages as of 2024.

- Ah Char Ka Lay
- Ah Lan Hpa Lut
- Ah Pyaung
- Ah See Ka Lay
- Auk Ka Bar
- Auk Kwin Gyi
- Aung Thar Yar
- Ba Wa Thit
- Bant Bway Su
- Boe Ba Kone
- Byaing Ka Hpee
- Chaung Twin
- Daw Nyein
- Day Da Lu
- Gay Gu
- Gyo War Kyan Khin Su
- Gyo War Kyauk Ye Su
- Gyon War Hta Lun
- Hmaw Bi
- Ka Ni
- Ka Zaung
- Kha Naung Shan Kwin
- Kha Yaing Baw
- Koe Ein Tan
- Kun Daing
- Kyaik Ka Bar
- Kyaung Kone
- Kyee Hnit Pin
- Kyet Hpa Mway Zaung
- Kyon Ka Dun
- Kyon Ku
- Kyon Kyaik
- Kyon Soke Gon Hnyin Tan
- Kyon Tar Shan Kwin
- Kyon Thut Ta Nyi
- Let Pan Pin
- Ma Ye Pyar Mut
- Min Hla Su
- Myo Kone
- Nauk Mee
- Pyapon Ta Man
- Seik Ma
- Tei Pin Seik
- Tha Leik Gyi
- Tha Mein Htaw Kone Tan
- Tha Mein Htaw Thein Kone
- Tha Pyay Kan
- Thea Ein Kyaung Su
- Thea Ein Ta Man
- Thone Htat
- Tin Pu Lwe
- Zin Baung
