= List of cities and largest towns in Myanmar =

The following is a list of cities and largest towns in Myanmar with populations above 5,000, according to UNFPA Myanmar. The capitals of states and regions in Myanmar are bolded. In Myanmar, the definition of a city is ambiguous with the Burmese term မြို့ ('myo') being translated as any urban area. The General Administration Department explicitly defines only the three cities of Yangon, Mandalay and Naypyidaw.

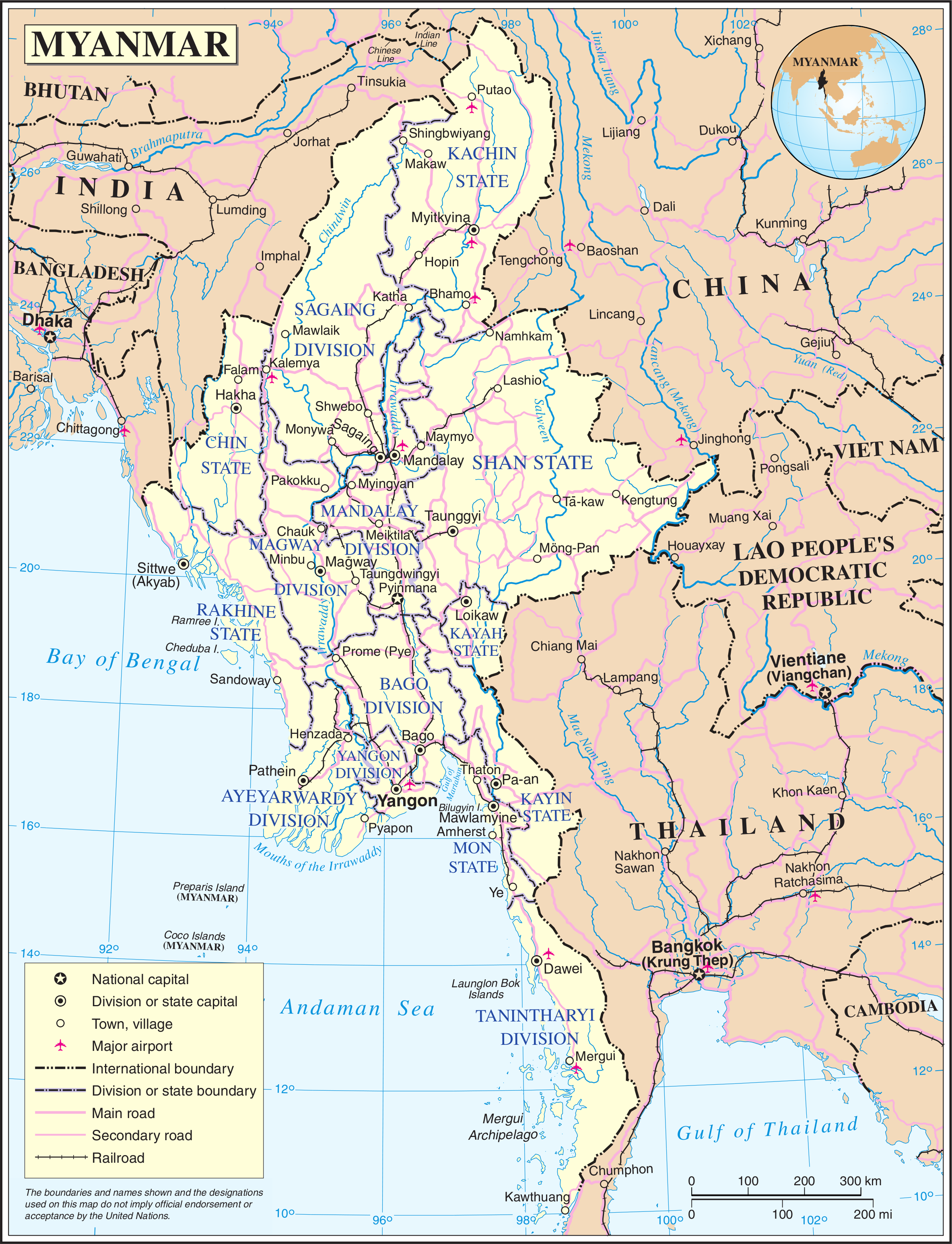
An enlargeable map of Myanmar.

== List of cities by urban population ==
Rank	City	State/Region	1993 Estimate	2014 Census	Change
1	**Yangon**	Yangon Region	3,361,741	5,160,512	+53.51%
2	**Mandalay**	Mandalay Region	885,287	1,319,452	+49.04%
3	**Naypyidaw**	Naypyidaw Union Territory	0	375,189	NA

== List of towns by urban population ==
Rank	Town	State/Region	2014 Census	1993 Estimate	Change
1	**Taunggyi**	Shan State	304,253	131,483	+131.40%
2	**Mawlamyine**	Mon State	231,894	307,615	−24.62%
3	**Bago**	Bago Region	220,487	190,930	+15.48%
4	Monywa	Sagaing Region	201,446	138,576	+45.37%
5	**Myitkyina**	Kachin State	180,491	71,320	+153.07%
6	**Pathein**	Ayeyarwady Region	172,923	183,903	−5.97%
7	Lashio	Shan State	144,031	107,604	+33.85%
8	Pyin Oo Lwin	Mandalay Region	128,783	85,712	+50.25%
9	**Sittwe**	Rakhine State	124,679	137,608	−9.40%
10	Pyay	Bago Region	123,247	105,698	+16.60%
11	Kalay	Sagaing Region	120,506	68,259	+76.54%
12	Myawaddy	Kayin State	113,155	113,155	0.00%
13	Pakokku	Magway Region	107,557	90,783	+18.48%
14	Myeik	Tanintharyi Region	107,185	122,670	−12.62%
15	Meiktila	Mandalay Region	102,405	129,674	−21.03%
15	Taungoo	Bago Region	98,822	83,538	+18.30%
16	Myingyan	Mandalay Region	91,542	103,555	−11.60%
17	Mogok	Mandalay Region	89,855	66,374	+35.38%
18	Taikkyi	Yangon Region	88,000	88,000	0.00%
19	**Magway**	Magway Region	84,754	72,388	+17.08%
20	Hinthada	Ayeyarwady Region	80,956	104,660	−22.65%
21	**Sagaing**	Sagaing Region	79,944	59,937	+33.38%
22	Thanlyin	Yangon Region	79,526	56,654	+40.37%
23	**Hpa-An**	Kayin State	75,141	75,141	0.00%
24	Muse	Shan State	74,313	74,313	0.00%
25	**Dawei**	Tanintharyi Region	73,470	96,755	−24.07%
26	Nyaunglebin	Bago Region	72,873	70,008	+4.09%
27	Shwebo	Sagaing Region	72,337	67,684	+6.87%
28	Pyinmana	Naypyidaw Union Territory	72,010	72,010	0.00%
29	Pyu	Bago Region	63,880	32,946	+93.89%
30	Hpakant	Kachin State	60,123	60,123	0.00%
31	Myaungmya	Ayeyarwady Region	58,698	58,698	0.00%
32	Shwegu	Kachin State	58,696	58,696	0.00%
33	Kawthaung	Tanintharyi Region	57,949	57,949	0.00%
34	Kalaw	Shan State	57,797	57,797	0.00%
35	Thanbyuzayat	Mon State	57,208	57,208	0.00%
36	Thaton	Mon State	55,047	86,413	−36.30%
37	Bhamo	Kachin State	54,711	39,092	+39.95%
38	Aunglan	Magway Region	52,865	43,223	+22.31%
39	Mudon	Mon State	52,514	62,222	−15.60%
40	Tachileik	Shan State	51,553	51,553	0.00%
41	**Loikaw**	Kayah State	51,349	51,349	0.00%
42	Yenangyaung	Magway Region	49,588	90,845	−45.41%
43	Pyapon	Ayeyarwady Region	49,128	50,874	−3.43%
44	Nyaung-U	Mandalay Region	48,528	48,528	0.00%
45	Bogale	Ayeyarwady Region	48,335	53,462	−9.59%
46	Taungdwingyi	Magway Region	46,023	52,330	−12.05%
47	Chauk	Magway Region	45,076	67,845	−33.56%
48	Kengtung	Shan State	44,289	57,022	−22.33%
49	Tamu	Sagaing Region	43,737	43,737	0.00%
50	Ma-ubin	Ayeyarwady Region	43,111	42,047	+2.53%
51	Twante	Yangon Region	43,092	37,947	+13.56%
52	Kawkareik	Kayin State	42,950	42,950	0.00%
53	Kyaukpadaung	Mandalay Region	42,817	42,817	0.00%
54	Kyauktan	Yangon Region	42,778	42,778	0.00%
55	Tatkon	Naypyidaw Union Territory	41,683	41,683	0.00%
56	Kyaukse	Mandalay Region	41,482	37,207	+11.49%
57	Kyaukme	Shan State	39,930	39,930	0.00%
58	Minbu	Magway Region	39,884	42,809	−6.83%
59	Hlegu	Yangon Region	38,757	20,675	+87.46%
60	Daik-U	Bago Region	38,477	38,477	0.00%
61	Tharrawaddy	Bago Region	38,116	42,478	−10.27%
62	Mrauk U	Rakhine State	36,139	36,139	0.00%
63	Kyaikto	Mon State	35,224	39,694	−11.26%
64	Ye	Mon State	34,430	38,838	−11.35%
65	Tangyan	Shan State	33,603	33,603	0.00%
66	Mohnyin	Kachin State	33,290	33,290	0.00%
67	Kayan	Yangon Region	32,977	32,894	+0.25%
68	Mawlamyinegyun	Ayeyarwady Region	32,915	31,909	+3.15%
69	Wundwin	Mandalay Region	32,558	32,558	0.00%
70	Pyawbwe	Mandalay Region	32,214	32,214	0.00%
71	Tanai	Kachin State	31,998	31,998	0.00%
72	Kyauktaga	Bago Region	31,656	31,656	0.00%
73	Labutta	Ayeyarwady Region	31,174	34,074	−8.51%
74	Aungpan	Shan State	30,313	30,313	0.00%
75	Namhkam	Shan State	30,269	30,269	0.00%
76	Lewe	Naypyidaw Union Territory	30,208	30,208	0.00%
77	Lawksawk	Shan State	29,533	29,533	0.00%
78	Paung	Mon State	29,434	29,434	0.00%
79	Taungup	Rakhine State	28,652	28,652	0.00%
80	Thongwa	Yangon Region	28,018	42,825	−34.58%
81	Yamethin	Mandalay Region	27,698	36,395	−23.90%
82	**Hakha**	Chin State	27,654	10,699	+158.47%
83	Payathonzu	Kayin State	27,311	27,311	0.00%
84	Panglong	Shan State	27,115	27,115	0.00%
85	Katha	Sagaing Region	26,732	31,517	−15.18%
86	Hmawbi	Yangon Region	25,960	25,960	0.00%
87	Paungde	Bago Region	25,455	30,160	−15.60%
88	Kanbalu	Sagaing Region	25,022	25,022	0.00%
89	Mogaung	Kachin State	25,012	25,012	0.00%
90	Kutkai	Shan State	24,963	24,963	0.00%
91	Letpadan	Bago Region	24,792	31,763	−21.95%
92	Shwegyin	Bago Region	24,579	24,579	0.00%
93	Kyaiklat	Ayeyarwady Region	24,479	40,655	−39.79%
94	Nyaungdon	Ayeyarwady Region	24,455	32,706	−25.23%
95	Yedashe	Bago Region	24,420	24,420	0.00%
96	Madaya	Mandalay Region	24,234	24,234	0.00%
97	Kyonpyaw	Ayeyarwady Region	23,966	23,966	0.00%
98	Nansang	Shan State	23,792	23,792	0.00%
99	Laukkai	Shan State	23,435	23,435	0.00%
100	Hopin	Kachin State	23,352	23,352	0.00%
101	Yesagyo	Magway Region	23,329	23,329	0.00%
102	Waw	Bago Region	23,143	23,143	0.00%
103	Gyobingauk	Bago Region	22,947	22,947	0.00%
104	Minbya	Rakhine State	22,944	22,944	0.00%
105	Hopong	Shan State	22,840	22,840	0.00%
106	Myanaung	Ayeyarwady Region	22,550	34,468	−34.58%
107	Wakema	Ayeyarwady Region	22,181	34,838	−36.33%
108	Waingmaw	Kachin State	21,969	21,969	0.00%
109	Chaung-U	Sagaing Region	21,929	21,929	0.00%
110	Danubyu	Ayeyarwady Region	21,762	21,762	0.00%
111	Kawlin	Sagaing Region	21,431	21,431	0.00%
112	Zalun	Ayeyarwady Region	21,254	21,254	0.00%
113	Homalin	Sagaing Region	21,220	21,220	0.00%
114	Hsipaw	Shan State	20,897	20,897	0.00%
115	Kyaukpyu	Rakhine State	20,866	20,866	0.00%
116	Mong La	Shan State	20,745	20,745	0.00%
117	Thazi	Mandalay Region	20,561	20,561	0.00%
118	Ye-U	Sagaing Region	20,458	20,458	0.00%
119	Thayet	Magway Region	20,278	46,361	−56.26%
120	Pantanaw	Ayeyarwady Region	19,820	19,820	0.00%
121	Kyangin	Ayeyarwady Region	19,495	19,495	0.00%
122	Kyauktaw	Rakhine State	19,492	19,492	0.00%
123	Myittha	Mandalay Region	19,342	19,342	0.00%
124	Palaw	Tanintharyi Region	18,936	18,936	0.00%
125	Nattalin	Bago Region	18,929	18,929	0.00%
126	Nawnghkio	Shan State	18,822	18,822	0.00%
127	Ngathaingchaung	Ayeyarwady Region	18,743	18,743	0.00%
128	Bilin	Mon State	18,392	18,392	0.00%
129	Shwedaung	Bago Region	17,681	17,681	0.00%
130	Pandaung	Bago Region	17,678	17,678	0.00%
131	Taungtha	Mandalay Region	17,528	17,528	0.00%
132	Kawa	Bago Region	17,396	17,396	0.00%
133	Papun	Kayin State	17,320	17,320	0.00%
134	Hopang	Shan State	16,893	16,893	0.00%
135	Myinmu	Sagaing Region	16,558	16,558	0.00%
136	Pekon	Shan State	16,546	16,546	0.00%
137	Nyaungshwe	Shan State	16,208	16,208	0.00%
138	Thandanggyi	Kayin State	16,056	16,056	0.00%
139	Kyaunggon	Ayeyarwady Region	16,052	16,052	0.00%
140	Putao	Kachin State	15,978	15,978	0.00%
141	Pangkham	Shan State	15,936	15,936	0.00%
142	Thanatpin	Bago Region	15,822	31,048	−49.04%
143	Thegon	Bago Region	15,752	15,752	0.00%
144	Dedaye	Ayeyarwady Region	15,320	15,320	0.00%
145	Zigon	Bago Region	15,233	15,233	0.00%
146	Hainggyikyun	Ayeyarwady Region	14,794	14,794	0.00%
147	Natmauk	Magway Region	14,737	14,737	0.00%
148	Tamoenye	Shan State	14,675	14,675	0.00%
149	Khampat	Sagaing Region	14,559	14,559	0.00%
150	Ngwesaung	Ayeyarwady Region	14,489	14,489	0.00%
151	Taze	Sagaing Region	14,361	14,361	0.00%
152	Thandwe	Rakhine State	14,327	48,873	−70.69%
153	Oktwin	Bago Region	14,143	14,143	0.00%
154	Paukkhaung	Bago Region	14,037	14,037	0.00%
155	Kamamaung	Kayin State	13,992	13,992	0.00%
156	Gangaw	Magway Region	13,939	13,939	0.00%
157	Mahlaing	Mandalay Region	13,850	13,850	0.00%
158	Lamaing	Mon State	13,614	13,614	0.00%
159	Einme	Ayeyarwady Region	13,554	13,554	0.00%
160	Htigyaing	Sagaing Region	13,535	13,535	0.00%
161	Loilem	Shan State	13,460	13,460	0.00%
162	Tedim	Chin State	13,452	13,452	0.00%
163	Ingapu	Ayeyarwady Region	13,320	13,320	0.00%
164	Namtu	Shan State	13,298	13,298	0.00%
165	Natogyi	Mandalay Region	12,818	12,818	0.00%
166	Pauktaw	Rakhine State	12,714	12,714	0.00%
167	Ponnagyun	Rakhine State	12,691	12,691	0.00%
168	Pinlaung	Shan State	12,629	12,629	0.00%
169	Minhla	Magway Region	12,510	12,510	0.00%
170	Tada-U	Mandalay Region	12,389	12,389	0.00%
171	Salin	Magway Region	12,158	12,158	0.00%
172	Kyunhla	Sagaing Region	12,148	12,148	0.00%
173	Hsi Hseng	Shan State	12,073	12,073	0.00%
174	Wuntho	Sagaing Region	11,972	11,972	0.00%
175	Maungdaw	Rakhine State	11,742	11,742	0.00%
176	Minhla, Bago	Bago Region	11,697	11,697	0.00%
177	Myebon	Rakhine State	11,566	11,566	0.00%
178	Hkamti	Sagaing Region	11,551	11,551	0.00%
179	Okpho	Bago Region	11,525	11,525	0.00%
180	Hlaingbwe	Kayin State	11,511	11,511	0.00%
181	Mindat	Chin State	11,505	11,505	0.00%
182	Khin-U	Sagaing Region	11,334	11,334	0.00%
183	Thayetchaung	Tanintharyi Region	11,305	11,305	0.00%
184	Kangyidaut	Ayeyarwady Region	11,092	11,092	0.00%
185	Kyaikmaraw	Mon State	11,021	11,021	0.00%
186	Kyaukkyi	Bago Region	10,815	10,815	0.00%
187	Wetlet	Sagaing Region	10,814	10,814	0.00%
188	Pindaya	Shan State	10,762	10,762	0.00%
189	Khamaukkyi	Tanintharyi Region	10,757	10,757	0.00%
190	Momauk	Kachin State	10,741	10,741	0.00%
191	Kyaukmyaung	Sagaing Region	10,703	10,703	0.00%
192	Ngapudaw	Ayeyarwady Region	10,682	10,682	0.00%
193	Yekyi	Ayeyarwady Region	10,627	10,627	0.00%
194	Mongyai	Shan State	10,620	10,620	0.00%
195	Momeik	Shan State	10,260	10,260	0.00%
196	Kengtung	Shan State	9,991	9,991	0.00%
197	Tantabin	Bago Region	9,889	9,889	0.00%
198	Ramree	Rakhine State	9,874	9,874	0.00%
199	Mong Hsu	Shan State	9,809	9,809	0.00%
200	Mong Nai	Shan State	9,767	9,767	0.00%
201	Buthidaung	Rakhine State	9,712	9,712	0.00%
202	Pang Hseng	Shan State	9,530	9,530	0.00%
203	Ayadaw	Sagaing Region	9,516	9,516	0.00%
204	Gwa	Rakhine State	9,510	9,510	0.00%
205	Kholan	Shan State	9,470	9,470	0.00%
206	Monyo	Bago Region	9,457	9,457	0.00%
207	Theinni	Shan State	9,152	9,152	0.00%
208	Falam	Chin State	9,092	9,092	0.00%
209	Kyainseikgyi	Kayin State	9,085	9,085	0.00%
210	Seikphyu	Magway Region	9,081	9,081	0.00%
211	Mong Pan	Shan State	8,972	8,972	0.00%
212	Mong Ko	Shan State	8,847	8,847	0.00%
213	Kalewa	Sagaing Region	8,819	8,819	0.00%
214	Matupi	Chin State	8,622	8,622	0.00%
215	Mawlaik	Sagaing Region	8,556	8,556	0.00%
216	Indaw	Sagaing Region	8,529	8,529	0.00%
217	Ann	Rakhine State	8,514	8,514	0.00%
218	Lweje	Kachin State	8,375	8,375	0.00%
219	Sintgaing	Mandalay Region	8,290	8,290	0.00%
220	Indaw	Shan State	8,252	8,252	0.00%
221	Mansi	Kachin State	8,146	8,146	0.00%
222	Tagaung	Mandalay Region	8,135	8,135	0.00%
223	Myothit	Magway Region	8,080	8,080	0.00%
224	Mong Hsat	Shan State	8,004	8,004	0.00%
225	Lai-Hka	Shan State	8,001	8,001	0.00%
226	Myaung	Sagaing Region	7,795	7,795	0.00%
227	Karli	Shan State	7,779	7,779	0.00%
228	Chaungzon	Mon State	7,727	7,727	0.00%
229	Myaing	Magway Region	7,706	7,706	0.00%
230	Than Tlang	Chin State	7,587	7,587	0.00%
231	Kunhing	Shan State	7,581	7,581	0.00%
232	Rathedaung	Rakhine State	7,511	7,511	0.00%
233	Singu	Mandalay Region	7,393	7,393	0.00%
234	Thabaung	Ayeyarwady Region	7,300	7,300	0.00%
235	Pauk	Magway Region	7,286	7,286	0.00%
236	Nganzun	Mandalay Region	7,080	7,080	0.00%
237	Mineye	Shan State	7,046	7,046	0.00%
238	Pinlebu	Sagaing Region	6,963	6,963	0.00%
239	Mine Pyin	Shan State	6,841	6,841	0.00%
240	Sidoktaya	Magway Region	6,514	6,514	0.00%
241	Langhko	Shan State	6,484	6,484	0.00%
242	Paletwa	Chin State	6,374	6,374	0.00%
243	Pwintbyu	Magway Region	6,350	6,350	0.00%
244	Palauk	Tanintharyi Region	6,176	6,176	0.00%
245	Banmauk	Sagaing Region	6,165	6,165	0.00%
246	Mong Hpayak	Shan State	6,074	6,074	0.00%
247	Kyeintali	Rakhine State	5,878	5,878	0.00%
248	Mong Ton	Shan State	5,819	5,819	0.00%
249	Ngathayauk	Mandalay Region	5,815	5,815	0.00%
250	Kamaing	Kachin State	5,734	5,734	0.00%
251	Mongmao	Shan State	5,655	5,655	0.00%
252	Thabeikkyin	Mandalay Region	5,630	5,630	0.00%
253	Demoso	Kayah State	5,621	5,621	0.00%
254	Salingyi	Sagaing Region	5,553	5,553	0.00%
255	Kunlon	Shan State	5,549	5,549	0.00%
256	Kyunsu	Tanintharyi Region	5,548	5,548	0.00%
257	Tanintharyi	Tanintharyi Region	5,514	5,514	0.00%
258	Maei	Rakhine State	5,435	5,435	0.00%
259	Shingbwiyang	Kachin State	5,417	5,417	0.00%
260	Bokpyin	Tanintharyi Region	5,384	5,384	0.00%
261	Launglon	Tanintharyi Region	5,334	5,334	0.00%
262	Manaung	Rakhine State	5,246	5,246	0.00%
263	Mawkmai	Shan State	5,222	5,222	0.00%
264	Budalin	Sagaing Region	5,210	5,210	0.00%
265	Kamma	Magway Region	5,202	5,202	0.00%
266	Sinpaungwe	Magway Region	5,089	5,089	0.00%
267	Kyaikkhami	Mon State	39,239	39,239	0.00%
268	Mottama	Mon State	39,671	39,671	0.00%

== Gallery ==
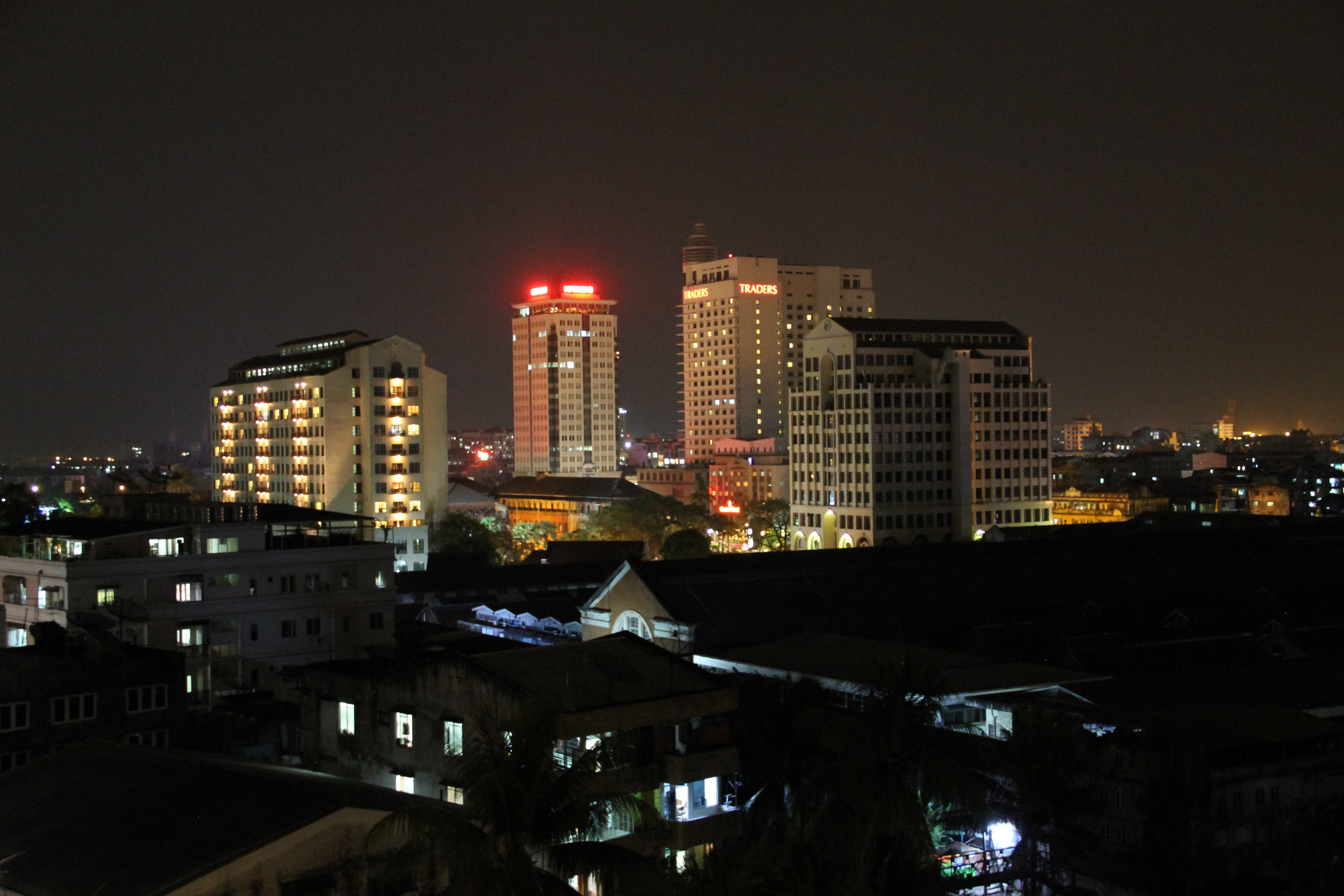
Yangon (Rangoon)

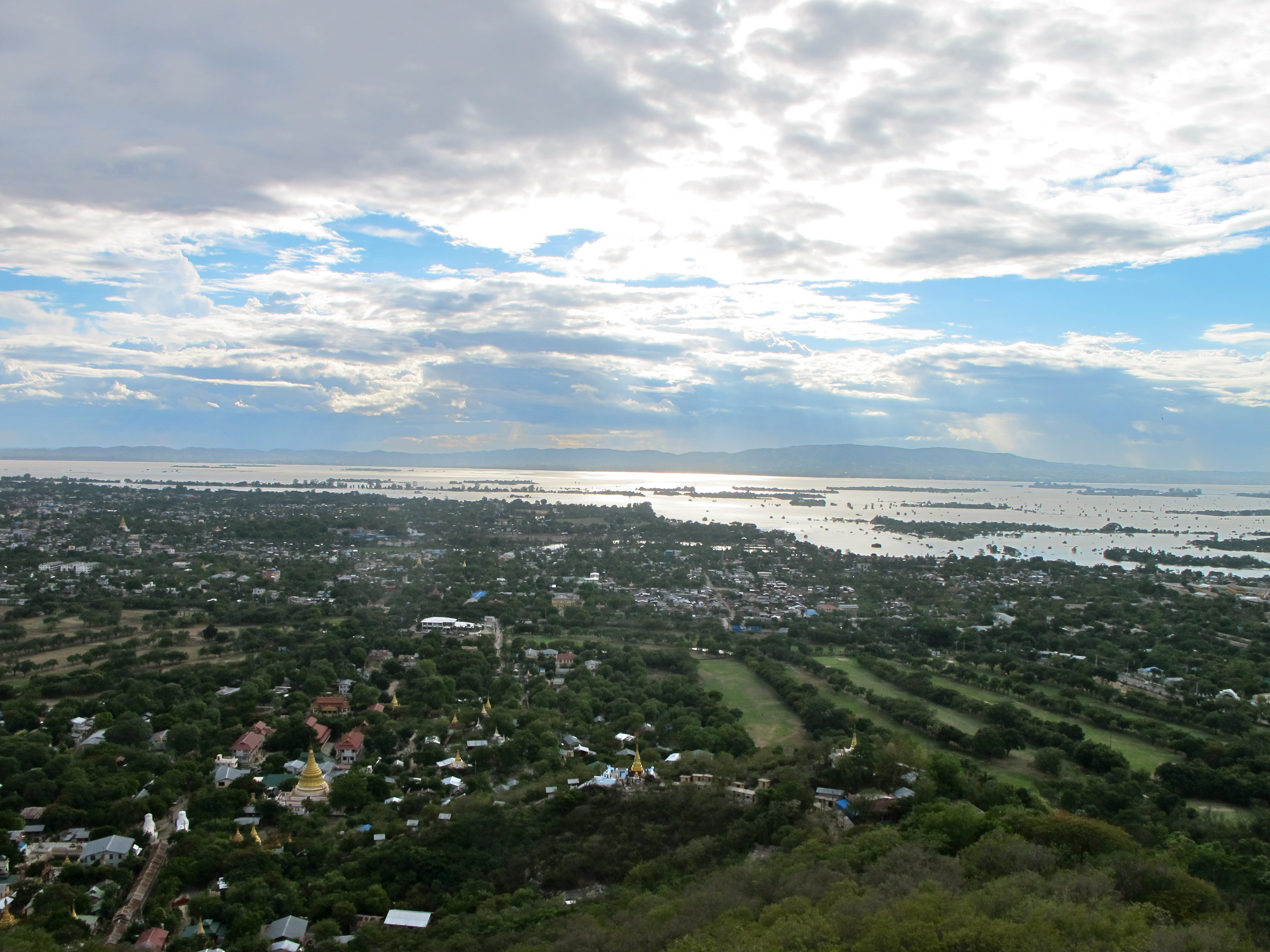
Mandalay

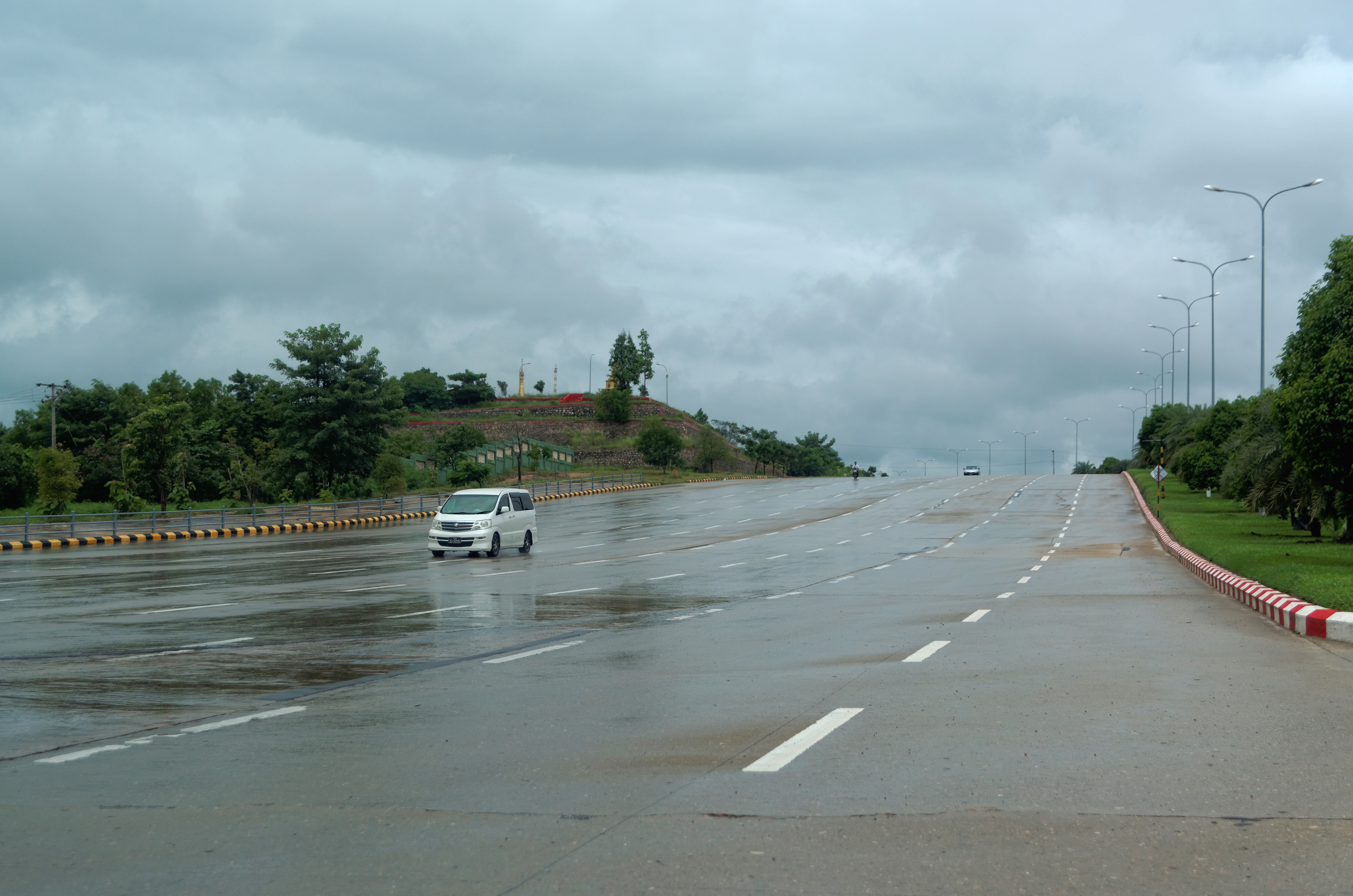
Naypyidaw

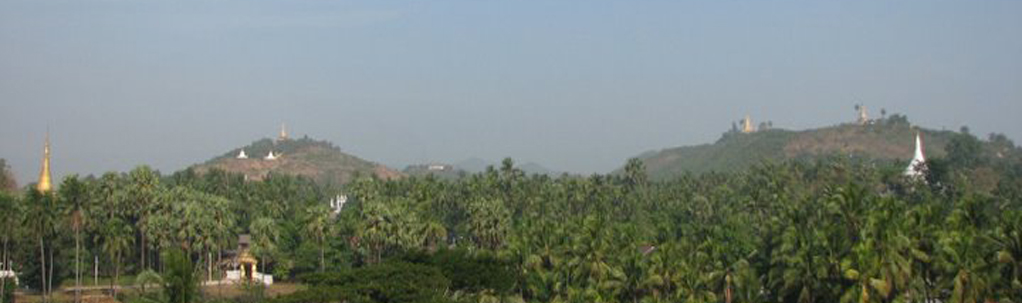
Mawlamyine (Moulmein)

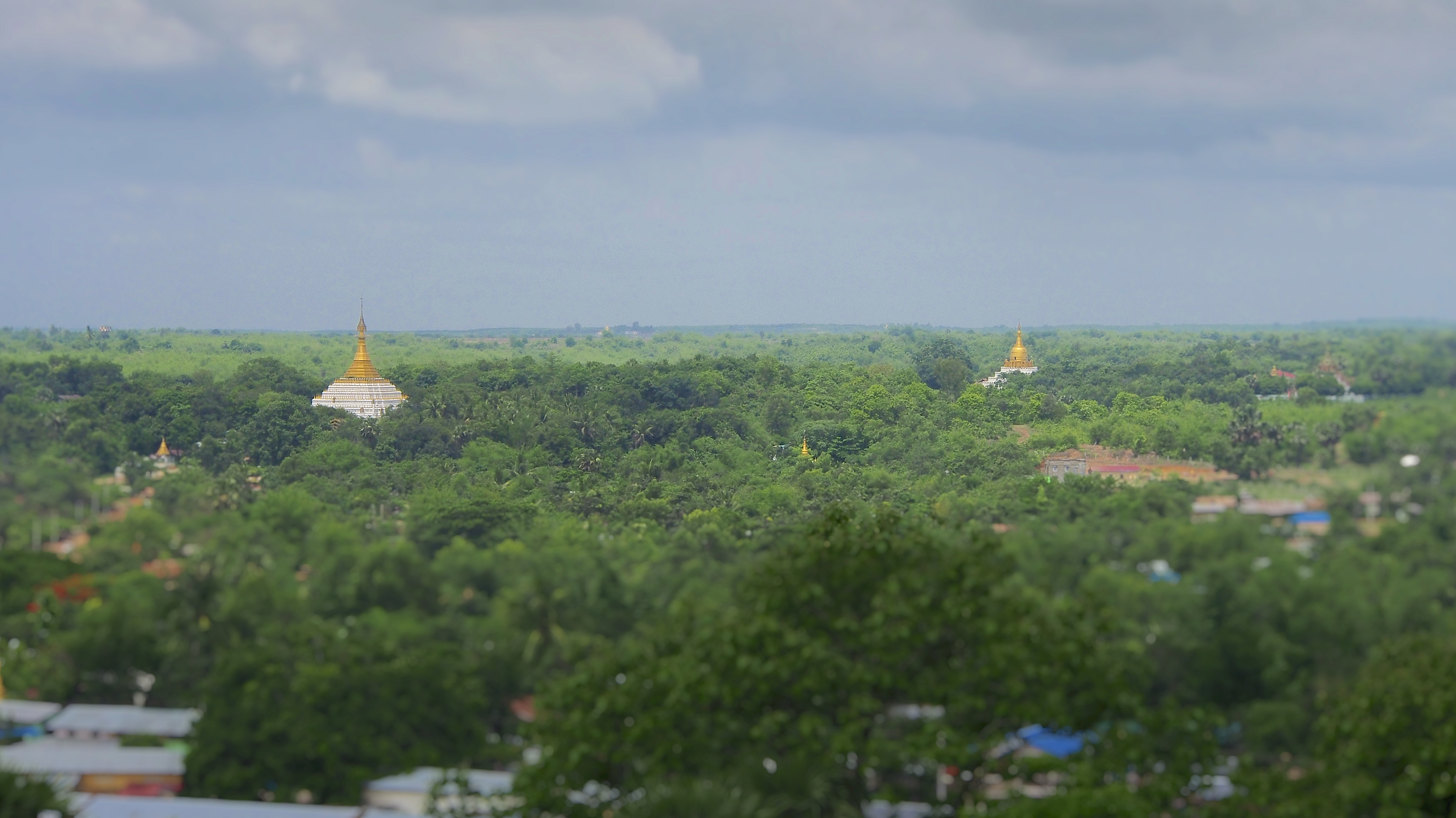
Bago (Pegu)

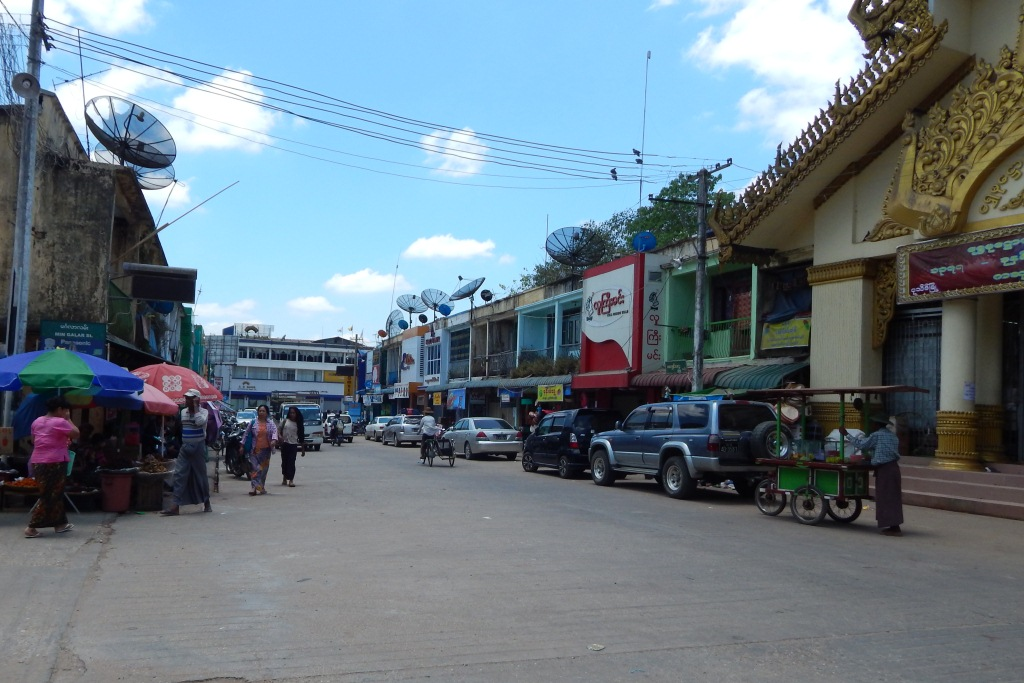
Pathein (Bassein)

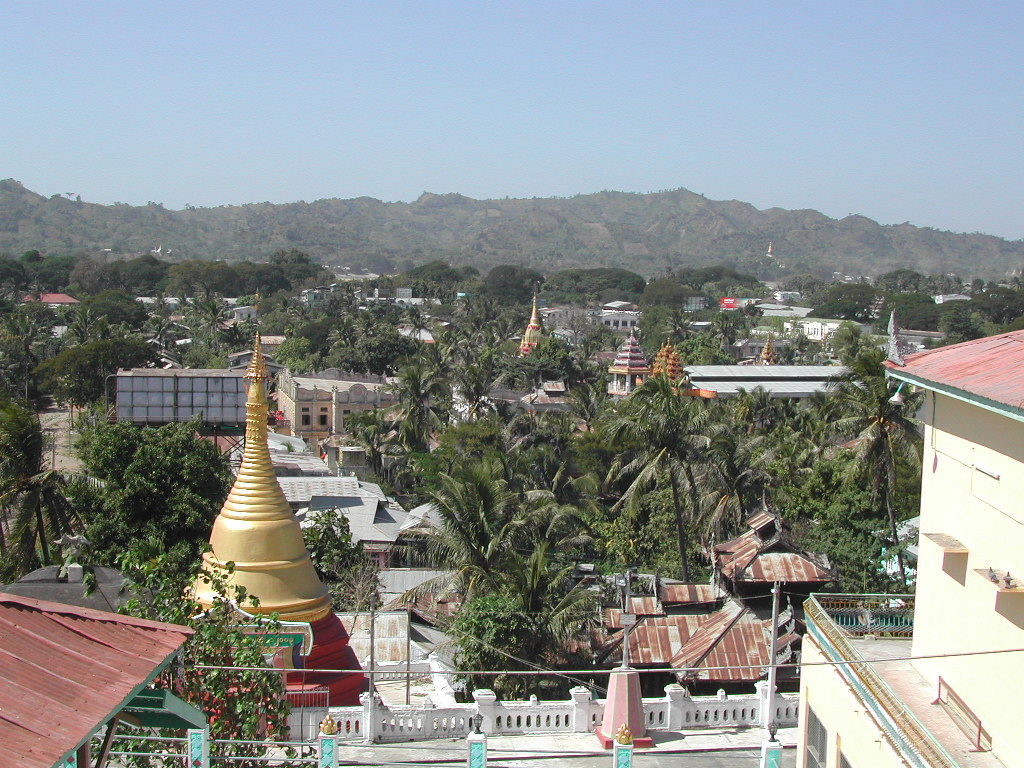
Pyay (Prome)

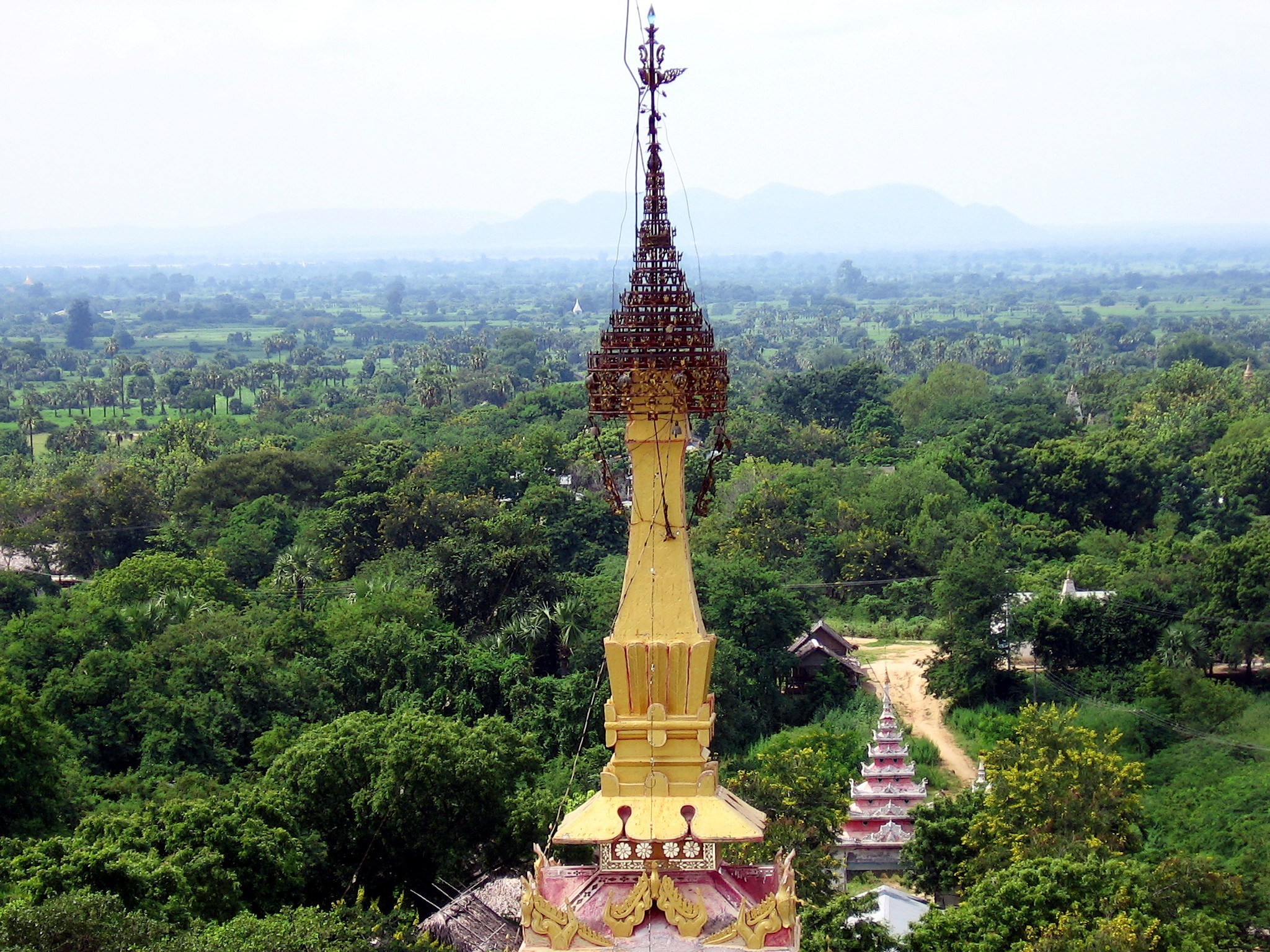
Monywa

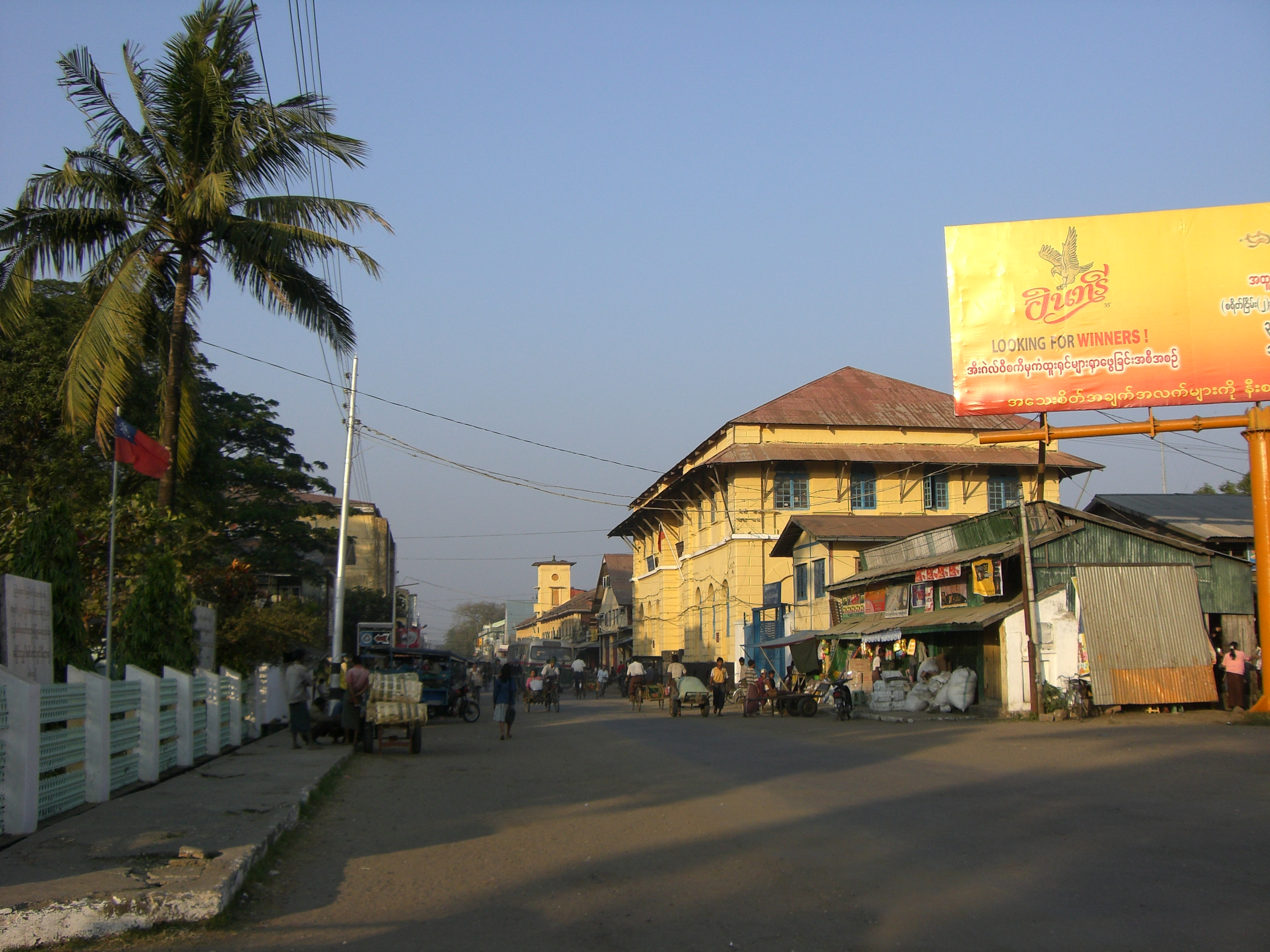
Sittwe (Akyab)

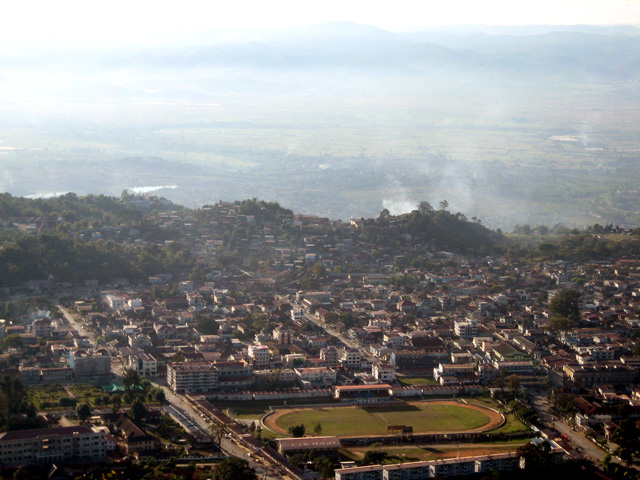
Taunggyi
