= Min Swe =

Burmese politician

- မင်းဆွေ

Member-elect of the Pyithu Hluttaw
- Preceded by: Constituency established
- Succeeded by: Constituency abolished
- Constituency: Pyapon № 2
- Majority: 20,358 (64%)

Personal details
- Born: 16 March 1944 (age 82) Kyonegadon village, Pyapon, Burma
- Party: National League for Democracy
- Relations: Poe Kya (father); Tin Oo (mother)
- Children: Thein Swe
- Education: Rangoon University; Rangoon Institute of Education
- Occupation: Politician

Min Swe (Burmese: မင်းဆွေ) is a Burmese politician and political prisoner. In the 1990 Burmese general election, he was elected as a Pyithu Hluttaw member of parliament, winning a majority of 20,358 (64% of the votes), but was never allowed to assume his seat.

Min Swe has a Bachelor of Science degree from Rangoon University and an education diploma from the Rangoon Institute of Education. From 1967 to 1984, he worked as a high school teacher. Min Swe joined the National League for Democracy following the 8888 Uprising.

From 28 October 1996 to 9 October 2001, Min Swe and his son Thein Swe were arrested for allegedly violating the Private Tuition Act for opening a private school.

His son Thein Swe currently serves as a Pyithu Hluttaw MP.
