= Meinmahla Kyun Wildlife Sanctuary =

Protected area in Myanmar

- Burmese: မိန်းမလှကျွန်း တောရိုင်းတိရစ္ဆာန် ဘေးမဲ့တော
- IUCN category IV (habitat/species management area)
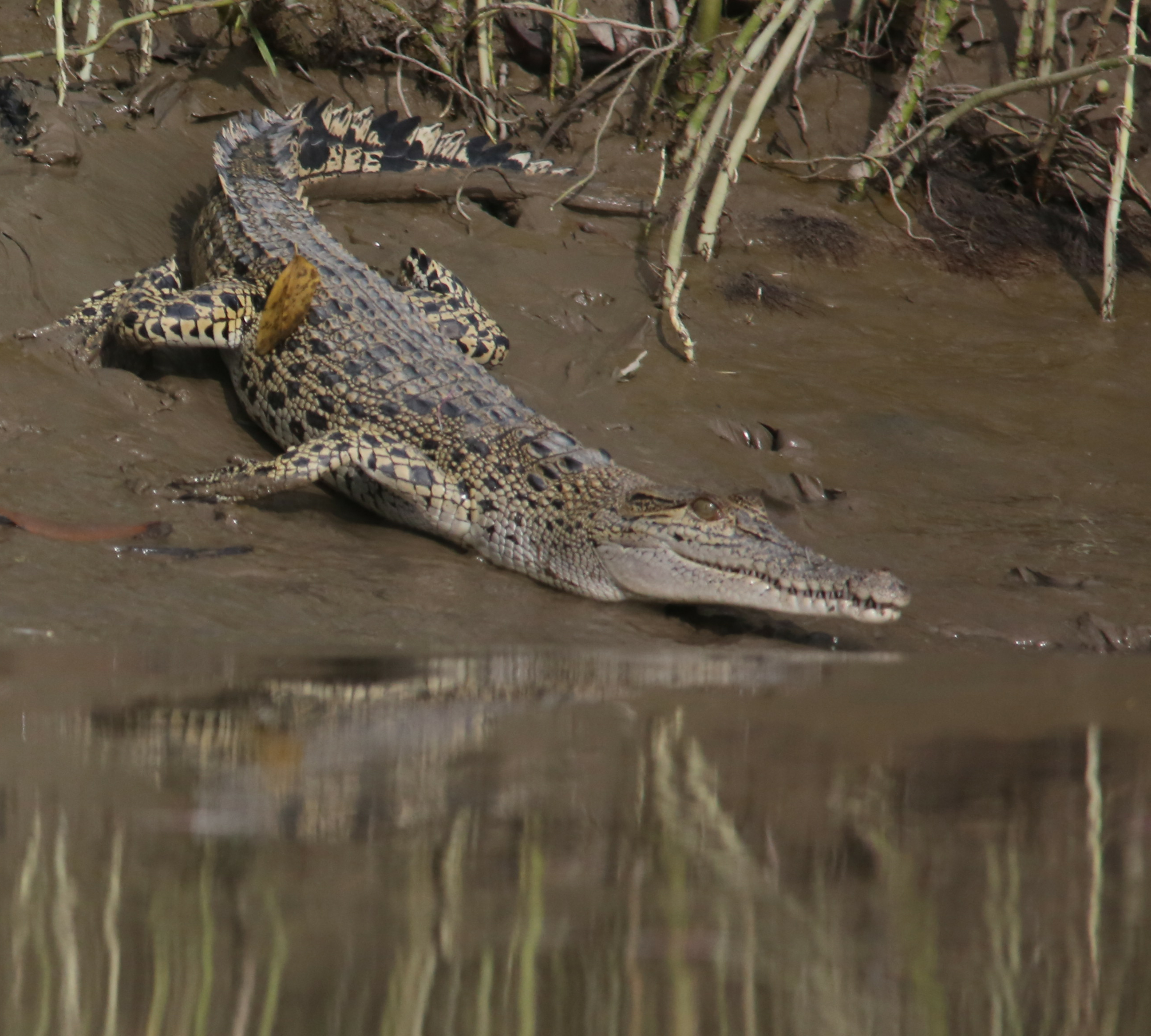
- Saltwater crocodile in Meinmahla Kyun Wildlife Sanctuary

- Location within Myanmar
- Location: Bogale Township, Ayeyarwady Region, Myanmar
- Nearest city: Bogale
- Coordinates: 16°1′08.06″N 95°17′55.18″E
- Area: 500 km^{2} (190 sq mi)
- Established: 1993
- Governing body: Myanmar Forest Department

Ramsar Wetland
- Official name: Meinmahla Kyun Wildlife Sanctuary
- Designated: 3 January 2017
- Reference no.: 2280

Meinmahla Kyun Wildlife Sanctuary is a protected area in Myanmar with an extent of 500 km^{2} (190 sq mi) and one of the ASEAN Heritage Parks. Meinmahla Kyun is an island in the Ayeyarwady Delta ranging in elevation from 0 to 30 m (0 to 98 ft) and covered by mangrove forest. It was declared a Ramsar site in 2017.

== Biodiversity ==
Meinmahla Kyun Wildlife Sanctuary harbours about 40 mangrove species, 53 species of medicinal plants and 11 orchid species, 59 fish species, 35 butterfly species, 26 snake species, 12 shrimp species, 10 crab species, and saltwater crocodile (Crocodylus porosus). A fishing cat (Prionailurus viverrinus) was photographed in February 2016 for the first time in the country.

The sanctuary provides habitat for both resident and migratory birds. Among the 102 species sighted during boat surveys in February 2006 were Oriental white ibis (Threskiornis melanocephalus), glossy ibis (Plegadis falcinellus), bar-tailed godwit (Limosa lapponica), hen harrier (Circus cyaneus), clamorous reed warbler (Acrocephalus stentoreus), Oriental white-eye (Zosterops palpebrosus), greater coucal (Centropus sinensis), red-breasted flycatcher (Ficedula parva), whimbrel (Numenius phaeopus) and black-crowned night-heron (Nycticorax nycticorax). Nordmann's greenshank (Tringa guttifer), rufous woodpecker (Micropternus brachyurus), lesser adjutant (Leptoptilos javanicus), black-headed ibis (Threskiornis melanocephalus), great thick-knee (Esacus recurvirostris), Eurasian curlew (Numenius arquata), Asian dowitcher (Limnodromus semipalmatus), brown-winged kingfisher (Pelargopsis amauroptera), great knot (Calidris tenuirostris), red knot (C. canutus), curlew sandpiper (Calidris ferruginea), spoon-billed sandpiper (C. pygmeus) and red-necked stint (C. ruficollis) were observed in December 2016.
