= Dedaye =

Town in Myanmar

Coordinates: 16°24′N 95°53′E

Dedaye (Burmese: ဒေးဒရဲမြို့ [dédəjɛ́ mjo̰]) is a town in the Ayeyarwady Region of south-west Myanmar. It is the seat of the Dedaye Township in the Pyapon District.
