= Irrawaddy Delta =

River delta in Burma

Coordinates: 16°29′N 95°00′E

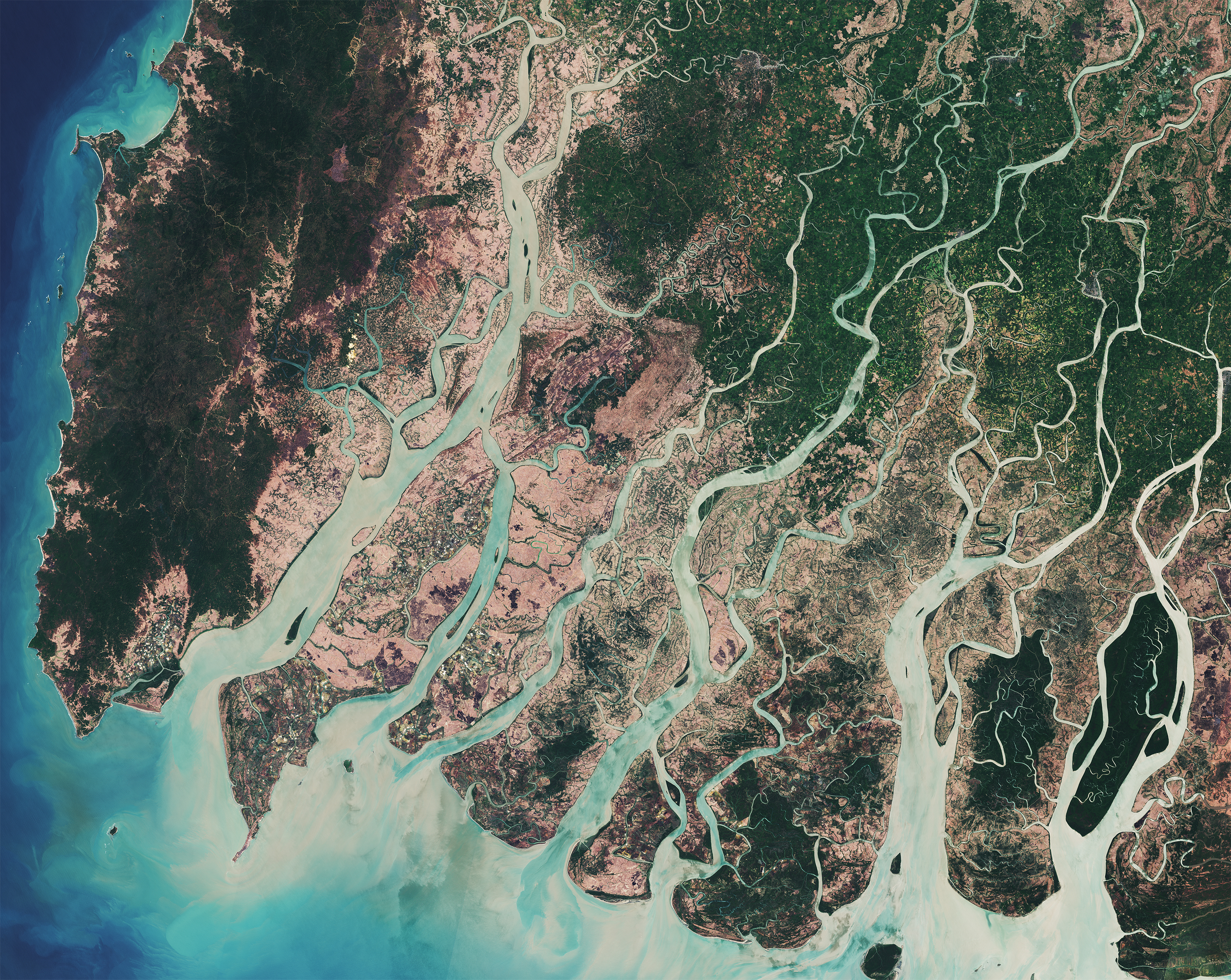
The delta as seen by the Sentinel-2A satellite in 2017

The Irrawaddy Delta or Ayeyarwady Delta lies in the Irrawaddy Division, the lowest expanse of land in Myanmar that fans out from the limit of tidal influence at Myanaung to the Bay of Bengal and Andaman Sea, 290 kilometres (180 mi) to the south at the mouth of the Irrawaddy River. The delta region is densely populated, and plays a dominant role in rice cultivation in its rich alluvial soil as low as just 3 metres (9.8 ft) above sea level. It also includes fishing communities in a vast area full of rivers and streams.

== Geography ==
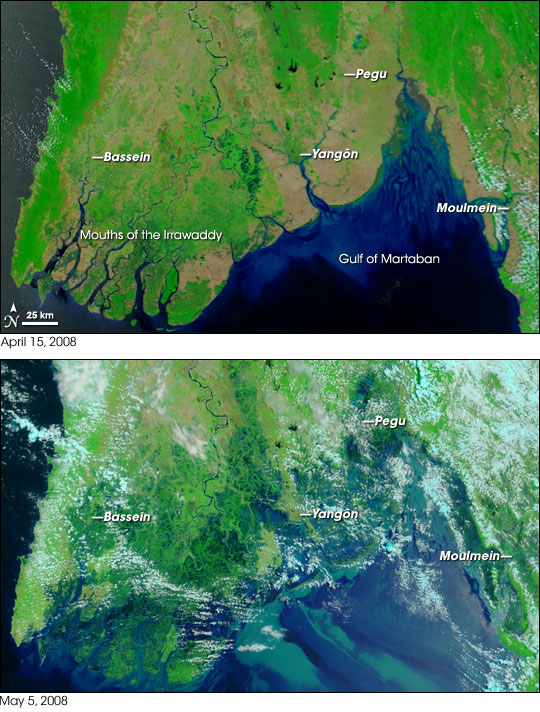
Portions of the low-lying delta, 50,400 km^{2} (19,500 sq mi) were destroyed by Cyclone Nargis

=== Arms and terrain ===
The Irrawaddy Delta comprises the main arms of Pathein River, Pyapon River, Bogale River, and Toe River. Mawtin Point, formerly Cape Negrais, is a famous landmark in the Irrawaddy Division, and it also marks the south west end of Myanmar. The delta begins around 93 km above Hinthada.

The highest point of the delta, Waphu Mount (404 m (1,325 ft)) lies between Pathein and Mawtin Zun (point), on the western strip of the delta. A major portion of the area is covered with low-lying lands just 3 metres (9.8 ft) above sea level. This alluvial plain is bounded to the west by the Rakhine Yoma and to the east by the Bago Yoma. It is dissected into peninsulas and islands by the large southward flowing rivers which are subject to tidal intrusion. The lower seaward third of the delta is completely flat with no local relief and stretches for 130 kilometres (81 mi) from east to west.

The waters of these rivers are very turbid due to a heavy silt load they carry and the sea is very shallow with depths less than 5.5 metres (18 ft) across the coastline and in the east for a distance of up to 28 kilometres (17 mi) offshore. As a result of constant accretion into the sea, the delta is advancing at a rate of 5–6 kilometres (3.1–3.7 mi) per 100 years, equivalent to about 1,000 hectares per year. This growth is due to both naturally friable soils and anthropogenic deforestation that further loosens soils, which then cascades down the river to build up the delta.

=== Climate ===
Annual rainfall in the delta region is approximately 2,500 mm (98.4 in), with a mean temperatures of 32 °C (90 °F). Most of the rain falls during the monsoons between mid-May and mid-November. It is cool and dry from mid-October to mid-February when temperatures begin to rise with premonsoon squalls in April and early May.

=== Ecosystems ===
Water purity lies within the pH range of alkaline condition due to early natural resources and weak environmental control. Mangroves or lamu and nipa palm or dani are the major vegetation of the delta. Moreover, control of weeds is less active as local farmers make mats during the summer. Destruction of mangroves and deforestation in the coastal region due to the Cyclone Nargis put it more at risk in future.

=== Islands ===
The principal islands include Haingyi Kyun, Leit Kyun (Turtle Island), Pyin Salu Kyun, and Meinmahla Kyun (Pretty Women Island).

=== Major cities ===
Major cities include Bogale, Maubin, Myaungmya, Moulmeingyun, Pantanaw, Pathein, Pyapon, Dedaye up to Twante, Kyauktan, and Hinthada Township.

=== Canals ===
There is no extensive system of irrigation or water transport canals except Twante Canal, constructed during the colonial period. It is much beneficial to the delta region for communication and commerce through water transportation with Yangon. Delta culture hence shifted to Yangon, its influence evident in places and products such as Bogale Market, Mortin Quarter, Yay Kyaw Quarter, Danubyu Restaurants, Pathein Halawa (halva dessert), Tinphyu mats from Pantanaw, and Pathein umbrella.

== History ==
The delta was historically populated by the Mon. Politically, the Burman kingdoms in farther north of the Irrawaddy River had controlled the delta area since the mid-11th century with few exceptions. The control of the fertile area reverted to Bago-based Mon kingdoms in the 13th to 15th centuries (1287–1539) and briefly in the 18th century (1747–1757).

The delta was also where the British first got a toe-hold in Burma. The British seized Haingyi Kyun or Negrais Island in 1753, after the Mon resisted their request to establish a trading post. The Burmese king Alaungpaya ceded the island to the British in 1757, but retook the island in 1759 by force when the king felt he had been betrayed by the British in his war against the Mon. The battle of Danubyu in 1825 in the delta was the last major stand by the Burmese against the advancing British forces in the First Anglo-Burmese War (1824–1826). The delta was seized by the British in the Second Anglo-Burmese War of 1852 and became part of British Burma.

The British colonial administration drained the marshes and swamps that dominated the area, and built dykes and embankments starting from 1861 for rice cultivation as the Burmans began to migrate south into British Burma in search of greener pastures. Now, 1,300 kilometres (808 mi) of major embankments in the delta protect 600,000 hectares of paddyland.

On 2 May 2008, the delta suffered a major disaster, devastated by Cyclone Nargis, which reportedly killed at least 77,000 people with over 55,900 missing, and left about 2.5 million homeless.

== Inhabitants ==
It is mainly populated by farming and fishing communities in several villages besides market towns, mostly located along the main rivers. At 100 per km^{2}, it is one of the most densely populated regions in the country with a total population of 3.5 million. Current inhabitants include, apart from the Mon and Bamar, a majority Pwo Kayin.

== Economy and development ==
The region is Myanmar's largest rice producer, so its infrastructure of road transportation has been greatly developed during the 1990s and 2000s. Two-thirds of the total arable land is under rice cultivation with a yield of about 2,000–2,500 kilograms (4,409–5,512 lb) per hectare. Fishing is carried out from fixed fishing frames as well as from small boats. Prawn fishery and harvesting sea turtle eggs are also major commercial activities both of which are now threatened by the loss of mangrove forests as clearing of land proceeds for agriculture. Since communication throughout the delta is easiest by water, almost every household possesses a boat and major towns such as Bogale, Mawlamyinegyun and Myaungmya are served by steamer.

== National heritage sites and nature reserves ==
Meinmahla Kyun Reservation is a national heritage site as well as a natural habitat to many mangrove forests and diverse sea life. The Irrawaddy dolphin (Orcaella brevirostris) is not a true river dolphin native to the Delta region, but it was named after the river, and these sea dolphins are known to enter the rivers of South East Asia. The Kyon Ka Pyin-Tap Seik Conservation Area is within the delta.

== See also ==
- Ayeyarwady Division
- Irrawaddy dolphin
- Cyclone Nargis
