= Pyapon District =

Coordinates: 16°15′N 95°30′E

Pyapon District (Burmese: ဖျာပုံခရိုင်) is a district of the Ayeyarwady Division in southwestern Myanmar. It consists of 4 cities. They are Pyapon, Bogalay, Kyaiklat and Dedaye.

location in Ayeyarwady region

== Townships ==
Townships of Pyapon District

The district contains the following townships:

- Pyapon Township
- Bogalay Township
- Kyaiklat Township
- Dedaye Township

In the Townships, there are 35 wards, 298 village groups and 1450 villages, about 856,788 people live here.
