= Pyapon =

Town in Ayeyarwady Region, Myanmar

Pyapon ဖျာပုံမြို့
- Town
- Location within Myanmar
- Coordinates: 16°17′10″N 95°39′57″E
- Country: Myanmar
- State: Ayeyarwady Region
- District: Pyapon District
- Township: Pyapon Township

Area
  - Total: 4.15 sq mi (10.75 km^{2})
- Elevation: 14 ft (4.3 m)

Population (2023)
  - Total: 47,082
  - Density: 11,340/sq mi (4,380/km^{2})
- Time zone: UTC+6.30 (Myanmar Standard Time)

Pyapon (Burmese: ဖျာပုံမြို့; Mon: ဖျာပုၚ်, /pʰja: paoŋ/) is a town and seat of Pyapon District as well as Pyapon Township in the Ayeyarwady Region of Myanmar, along the Pyapon River, a distributary of the Ayeyarwady River. It is located about 15 kilometres (9.3 mi) inland from the Andaman Sea, about 75 miles (121 km) south of the previous capital, Yangon. In 2023, it had a population of 47,082. It serves as a center for collecting rice from the surrounding agricultural areas, and is home to a diesel-run power plant, using equipment by the German firm Siemens.

Tourists and visitors to Pyapon cruise in the nearby backwaters where nearby mangroves are home to birds, crocodiles and, occasionally, dolphins.

== History ==
Historical Population
Year	Pyapon	±%
1983	39,862	—
2019	47,321	+18.7%
2023	47,082	−0.5%
Source: Britannica, General Administration Department data

The city's name is believed to derive from the Mon name, ဖျာပုၚ်, which literally translates to "rice market." The Mon were the first to settle the city on the Pyapon River, choosing the furthest inland a ship could travel on low tide. In 1782, Badon Min declared Pyapon as a town. The modern city of Pyapon was formally elevated to city status in 1972.

In the early 20th century, Pyapon reclaimed alluvial marshlands for rice cultivation, attracting a large number of settlers.

== Climate ==
Climate data for Pyapon (1981−2010)
Month	Jan	Feb	Mar	Apr	May	Jun	Jul	Aug	Sep	Oct	Nov	Dec	Year
Mean daily maximum °C (°F)	30.7 (87.3)	33.0 (91.4)	34.6 (94.3)	35.5 (95.9)	32.7 (90.9)	30.4 (86.7)	29.7 (85.5)	29.5 (85.1)	30.0 (86.0)	31.8 (89.2)	32.3 (90.1)	30.6 (87.1)	31.7 (89.1)
Daily mean °C (°F)	23.2 (73.8)	24.6 (76.3)	26.6 (79.9)	28.8 (83.8)	27.9 (82.2)	26.7 (80.1)	26.1 (79.0)	25.9 (78.6)	26.0 (78.8)	27.0 (80.6)	26.3 (79.3)	23.9 (75.0)	26.1 (79.0)
Mean daily minimum °C (°F)	15.6 (60.1)	16.3 (61.3)	18.6 (65.5)	22.1 (71.8)	23.0 (73.4)	22.9 (73.2)	22.5 (72.5)	22.2 (72.0)	22.0 (71.6)	22.2 (72.0)	20.4 (68.7)	17.3 (63.1)	20.4 (68.8)
Average precipitation mm (inches)	0.7 (0.03)	0.5 (0.02)	1.4 (0.06)	15.7 (0.62)	143.5 (5.65)	156.8 (6.17)	205.4 (8.09)	229.5 (9.04)	164.6 (6.48)	72.0 (2.83)	13.3 (0.52)	4.4 (0.17)	1,007.8 (39.68)
Average precipitation days (≥ 0.1 mm)	0.1	0.1	0.3	0.9	5.4	7.4	8.1	8.4	7.6	4.2	0.9	0.3	43.7
Source: NOAA

== Culture ==
Since 1878, Pyapon's theatrical troupe has hosted annual performances of the Yama Zatdaw, Myanmar's adaptation of the Ramayana, a Sanskrit epic.

== Notable people ==
- San Hlaing, artist
