= Dedaye Township =

Dedaye Township ဒေးဒရဲမြို့နယ်
- Township
- Location in Pyapon district
- Coordinates: 16.4036°N 95.8828°E
- Country: Myanmar
- Region: Ayeyarwady Region
- District: Pyapon District
- Time zone: UTC+6:30 (MMT)

Dedaye Township (Burmese: ဒေးဒရဲမြို့နယ် [dédəjɛ́ mjo̰nɛ̀]) is a township of Pyapon District in the Ayeyarwady Region of Myanmar.
