= Bogale =

Bogale ဘိုကလေးမြို့
- Location in Myanmar
- Coordinates: 16°17′15″N 95°23′52″E
- Country: Myanmar
- Region: Ayeyarwady Region
- District: Pyapon District
- Township: Bogale Township

Area
  - Total: 1.95 sq mi (5.1 km^{2})

Population (2026)
  - Total: 47,074
  - Density: 24,100/sq mi (9,320/km^{2})
- Time zone: UTC+6.30 (MMT)

Bogale (Burmese: ဘိုကလေးမြို့ [bòɡəléɪ mjo̰]; also spelled Bogalay) is the principal town of Bogale Township, Ayeyarwady Region, Myanmar. It is located on the south-western part of Myanmar on the mainland section of the country. It can be reached by both water transportation and by land. The town is divided into 10 urban wards.

== History of the region ==
The history of the Bogale must begin with its first known inhabitants. The Mons are believed to have first inhabited the region in 3000 BC. Although most of the Mons records and writings have been destroyed through war or simply over time, spoken Burmese tradition states that the Mons began instituting Buddhist beliefs into their culture around 300 BC. By the 9th century the Mons are believed to have most of southern present-day Myanmar.

After briefly losing power in the region to the Bagan Kingdom, the Mons regained control of the southern region of Myanmar in 1472 under King Dhammazedi. During King Dhammazedi 20-year reign from 1472 to 1492 the area currently encompassed by the Bogalay Township experienced a time of rapid economic growth and increase in cultural identity, with roots in Theravada Buddhism. The region became a key post in commerce of Southeast Asia. By 1757 the Mons had been stripped of their power in southern Myanmar and the Konbaung dynasty had begun. The leader responsible for taking control of southern Myanmar and unifying the north and the south was Alaungpaya.

By the turn of the 19th century, Britain had gained complete control over all of Burma via the three Anglo-Burmese Wars. Britain's occupation of Burma drastically changed the culture of southern Burma (Bogalay Township Region). An infiltration of Christianity began to take place in southern Burmese regions.

In the early 19th century, an Anglo-Burmese hunter named U Maung Kalay set up camp to hunt. To avoid each other's rifle fire, locals gathered near his camp and the area came to be known as Bogaleseik (Burmese: ဘိုကလေးဆိပ်, lit. 'Little Foreigner Port').

In October 1991, a Tatmadaw military patrol encountered Karen National Liberation Army (KNLA) soldiers infiltrating the township to foment an uprising. In what became known as the Bogalay Crisis within the broader Karen conflict, the military junta send a large amount of troops and committed human rights violations. The extent of their actions are contested. Eyewitness accounts describe collective punishment detentions, sexual assault, torture and the killing of 800-1000 civilians to crush the uprising. Official reports stated that 276 "enemy combatants" had been killed.

=== Nargis cyclone ===
In May 2008, Cyclone Nargis hit Ayeyarwady Region, affecting 2.4 million people. 23,000 people were displaced in Bogale, and the township's hospital system remained functional.

Cyclone Nargis was the deadliest natural disaster ever recorded to hit Burma. Bogale Township was one of the worst affected areas of the cyclone that hit the area. In Bogale town, 95% of the homes are believed to have been destroyed by the tropical storm. Government officials estimate that over 10,000 people were left dead in the Bogalay Township region alone after the initial storm.

== Economy ==
The Bogale Township region of Myanmar/Burma has many natural resources that drive their economy. Outside of the main city limits, roads are sketchy at best and people are practically cut off from the main Bogale city.

Because of the Bogale Township's ideal location on the base of the delta, farming and agriculture are huge industries in the region. The Bogale Township region is one of the largest producers of rice in all of Myanmar. The rice is typically processed in factories in downtown Bogalay. The largest of these factories employs 2,500 workers in downtown Bogale. This rice is often sold in local markets as a vital source of food for villagers.

In addition to the region's geographically friendly atmosphere towards agriculture, the Bogale Township is also ideal for fishing in certain times of the year. Fish can be caught in large amounts and sold in the markets as a supplement to the frequent purchases of rice.

== Notable people ==
- Mya Thaung (born 1943), Burmese painter
