= Ayeyarwady Region =

Region of Myanmar

Ayeyarwady Region ဧရာဝတီတိုင်းဒေသကြီး
- Region

MLC transcription(s)
  - Burmese: erawa.ti tuing: desa. kri:
- Flag Seal

- Location of Ayeyarwady Region in Myanmar
- Coordinates: 16°50′N 95°10′E
- Country: Myanmar
- Region: Lower
- Capital: Pathein

Government
  - Chief Minister: Tin Maung Win
  - Cabinet: Ayeyarwady Region Government
  - Legislature: Ayeyarwady Region Hluttaw
  - Judiciary: Ayeyarwady Region High Court

Area
  - Total: 13,570 sq mi (35,140 km^{2})
  - Rank: 10th
- Highest elevation (Taungni): 4,019 ft (1,225 m)

Population (2014)
  - Total: 6,184,829
  - Rank: 2nd
  - Density: 455.9/sq mi (176.0/km^{2})
- Demonym: Ayeyarwadian

Demographics
  - Ethnicities: Bamar, Rakhine, Indians, Karen
  - Religions: Buddhism 92.1% Christianity 6.3% Islam 1.4% Hinduism 0.1% Others 0.1%
- Time zone: UTC+06:30 (MST)
- HDI (2017): 0.530 low · 11th
- Website: www.ayeyarwady.gov.mm

Ayeyarwady Region (Burmese: ဧရာဝတီတိုင်းဒေသကြီး [ʔèjàwədì táiɰ̃ dèθa̰ dʑí], S'gaw Karen: ထံထၣ်စွ့, Pwo Western Karen: ထံၫထၪကျိၩ့; formerly Ayeyarwady Division and Irrawaddy Division) is a first-level administrative division of Myanmar, occupying the delta region of the Ayeyarwady River (Irrawaddy River). It is bordered by the Rakhine State to the northwest, the Bago Region to the north, Bago Region and Yangon Region to the east, and the Bay of Bengal to the south and west.

The region lies between approximately latitude 15° 40' and 18° 30' north and between longitude 94° 15' and 96° 15' east. It has an area of 13,566 square miles (35,140 km^{2}). The estimated 2022 population is more than 6.5 million. According to the 2014 Burmese National Census the population of the Ayeyarwady Region was 6,184,829, making it the second most populous of Myanmar's states and regions after Yangon Region.

Ayeyarwady Region is flanked by the Rakhine Yoma (Arakan Mountains) range in the west. Large areas have been cleared for paddy cultivation, leading to its preeminent position as the main rice producer in the country, a position it has retained into the 21st century. It has also a number of lakes. Of the rivers branching out from the mighty Ayeyarwady, Ngawun, Pathein and Toe are famous.

The capital city of Ayeyarwady Region is Pathein. Chaungtha Beach and Ngwesaung Beach are popular resorts for both foreigners and the Burmese. They are in the west of the Ayeyarwady Region, an hour from Pathein city and four hours from Yangon city by road.

== History ==
=== Prehistory ===
The Ayeyarwady delta region was historically part of the Mon kingdoms like the Hanthawaddy kingdom. This area fell under Burmese (and occasional Arakanese and Mon) rule from the 11th century AD onwards. Its subsequent history mirrors that of the rest of lower Burma.

An ancient overland pre-Tang trade route from Sichuan (modern Yunnan Province) to Bengal passed through Ayeyarwady.

=== British rule ===
Prior to British rule in Burma, much of the Ayeyarwady delta was sparsely populated forest, mangrove and plain land with isolated Mon, Karen and Burman settlements; the region saw only limited rice cultivation on lands that were frequently flooded. In the 1750s, the Konbaung Kingdom defeated the Mon Kingdom, but their limited technology in the face of an unwelcome natural environment prevented further settlement in the region.

After the second Anglo-Burmese War in 1852, the British gained control of the Ayeyarwady delta. Over the next few decades, due to British efforts, the delta evolved into a key centre for rice cultivation and was one of the world's top rice-exporting regions, as Burmese small-scale subsistence farmers became integrated into a capitalist economy. Global events like the Indian Rebellion of 1857 and the American Civil War led to a drop in rice exports from these regions, contributing to the delta becoming a crucial supplier in the colonial food system.

==== Initial phase ====
Adas (1974) describes the Ayeyarwady delta of 1857 to 1907 as being in an initial phase of rapid development. Inhabitants extensively migrated from northern to southern regions, attracted by opportunities emerging from the expanding agriculture. To support this growth, the British introduced a land taxation system modeled after those in British India, such as the Ryotwari, which enabled farmers to buy, sell, and transfer land. They also established formal land tenure systems, such as the Patta system, which granted ownership rights after long-term cultivation and tax payment.

Many migrants from Upper Burma became landowners and gradually increased their holdings, leading to upward mobility. By 1905–06, only about 18 percent of farmland in the delta was owned by non-farmers. At first, Burmese lenders provided access to credit, which played a crucial role in driving agricultural expansion, but by the end of the late 19th century, Indian Chettiar moneylenders had become increasingly prominent. The Chettiars migrated from Bengal to Yangon and the delta, offering larger loans at more favourable rates. By 1901, Indians made up around 7 percent of the delta's population. From 1852 to 1937, roughly 2.6 million Indians migrated to Burma, primarily settling in the delta region and Yangon. A socially diverse society developed, where Europeans controlled the rice export and processing sectors, the Burmese worked as farmers, and the Chettiars provided financial services. The Chettiars used their previous financial expertise and the geographical closeness of Madras to their advantage. According to Adas, the subsistence nature of the Burmese economy prior to British rule had limited local participation in credit, creating a space that the Chettiars successfully moved into and dominated.

==== Transition period and agricultural crisis ====
Adas describes 1907 to 1930 as a transitional era. The availability of new land for rice cultivation, which was primarily driving agricultural growth earlier, began to diminish by the late 1920s. Economic pressures increased as land prices surged due to arable land becoming scarce or too costly to develop. For instance, in Prome, the cost of land increased from 29 rupees per acre in 1900 to 103 rupees by 1915. Farmers were forced to cultivate in more marginal and risk-prone areas. At the same time, levels of debt among Burmese cultivators rose, and increasing numbers of farmers lost their land through foreclosures. This led to a transfer of land ownership from farmers to creditors, majorly comprised by the Chettiars. Over time, the relationships between the British investors, Chettiar moneylenders and Burmese farmers grew increasingly strained.

After World War I, the decline of the British economy led to reduced demand for Burmese rice. By 1930, Burmese farmers were heavily indebted, and Chettiar lenders, hit by a global credit crisis, intensified debt recovery, leading to many foreclosures. In 1929–30, non-agriculturalists owned 31 percent of delta land; by 1935, this rose to around 50 percent. Between 1931 and the Japanese invasion of Burma in 1941, the delta experienced mass land dispossession and unemployment. This period saw backlash and violence against the Chettiars, riots in Yangon, and the failed Saya San-led rebellion. The Japanese invasion prompted the flight of up to 400,000 Indians, leaving the rice economy in turmoil and the region without a strong capitalist class. These colonial-era conditions set the stage for landlessness and land-grabbing following Burmese independence in 1948.

=== Cyclone Nargis ===
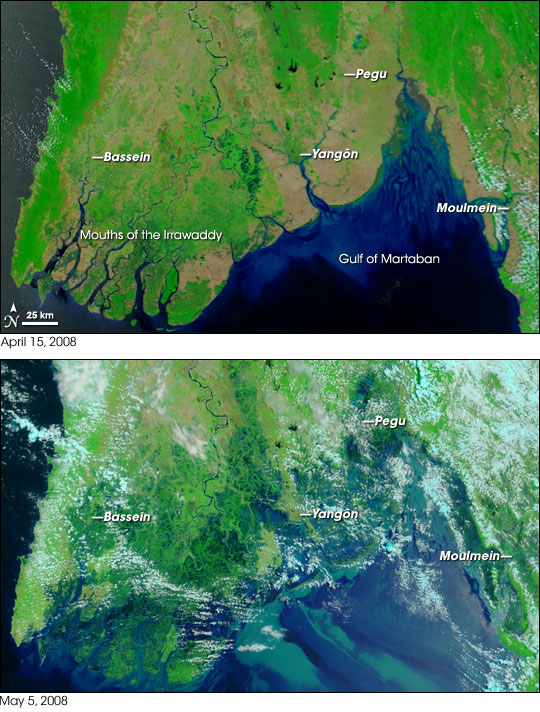
Satellite photography of the Irrawaddy Delta before (top) and after (bottom) Nargis hit the area.

Ayeyarwady Region was the site of heavy devastation when Cyclone Nargis made landfall in early May 2008. The cyclone made landfall on the town of Wagon near Haigyi Island. Labutta Township was most heavily struck with around 80,000 deaths. The cyclone's path devastated the low-lying delta regions going through south-central Ayeyarwady Region and Bogale before entering neighbouring Yangon Region. Nargis was the most expensive tropical cyclone on record in the North Indian Ocean at the time, costing $12 billion in aid.

Burma's state-controlled news media reported that Nargis left more than 66,000 people dead or missing after it struck the Irrawaddy Delta region May 2, unleashing torrential rains, 120 mph sustained winds and a 12-foot (3.7 m) storm surge. Foreign relief officials and diplomats said the death toll could exceed 100,000, making it the worst natural disaster in the recorded history of Myanmar. The final death toll was at least 146,000 with 90,000 confirmed dead and 56,000 or more missing.

== Administrative divisions ==
8 districts of Ayeyarwady

Ayeyarwady Region consists of eight districts:

- Pathein District
- Kyonpyaw District
- Hinthada District
- Labutta District
- Maubin District
- Myanaung District
- Myaungmya District
- Pyapon District

Labutta District was formed in August 2008, three months after Cyclone Nargis hit the region. Kyonpyaw District and Myanaung District are the newest districts, formed in 2019 in the lead up to the 2020 Elections.

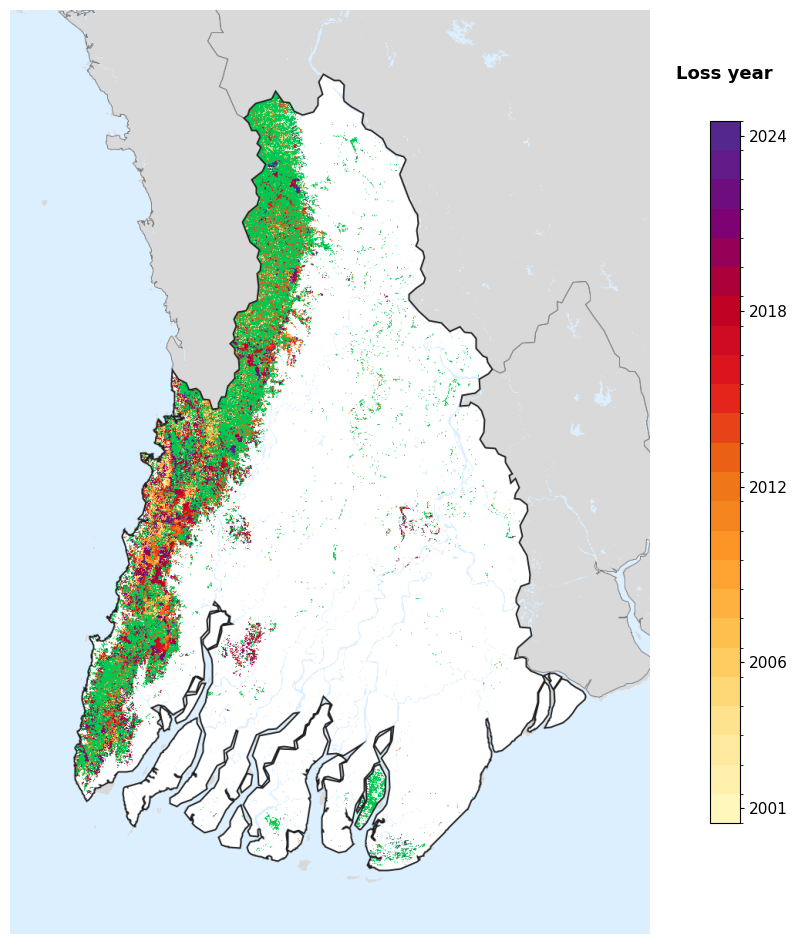
Tree-cover loss year in Ayeyarwady Region, 2001-2024, from the Global Forest Change dataset.

Pathein is the capital city and capital. The region consists of 26 townships and 29 cities. In the townships there are 219 wards, 1912 village groups and 11651 villages.

== Government ==
=== Executive ===
The Ayeyarwady Region Government is the government of Ayeyarwady Region, responsible for its administration. The region was under the control of the State Administration Council, following the 2021 Myanmar coup until 2026 when the SAC was replaced by the State Security and Peace Commission.

=== Legislature ===
The Ayeyarwady Region Hluttaw is the unicameral legislature of Ayeyarwady Region, responsible for local governance, passing regional laws, approving localized budgets, and overseeing the region cabinet. It has 72 seats and its latest election concluded in 2026.

=== Judiciary ===
The Ayeyarwady Region High Court is the highest court within Ayeyarwady Region.

== Demographics ==
Historical population
Year	Pop.	±%
1973	4,156,673	—
1983	4,994,061	+20.1%
2014	6,184,829	+23.8%
2024	6,330,000	+2.3%
Source: 2014 Myanmar Census

In 2014, Ayeywarwady Region had a population of 6.18 million. Burmese is the lingua franca. The majority of the people are Buddhist, with small minorities of Christians, Muslims, Hindus and Baháʼís.

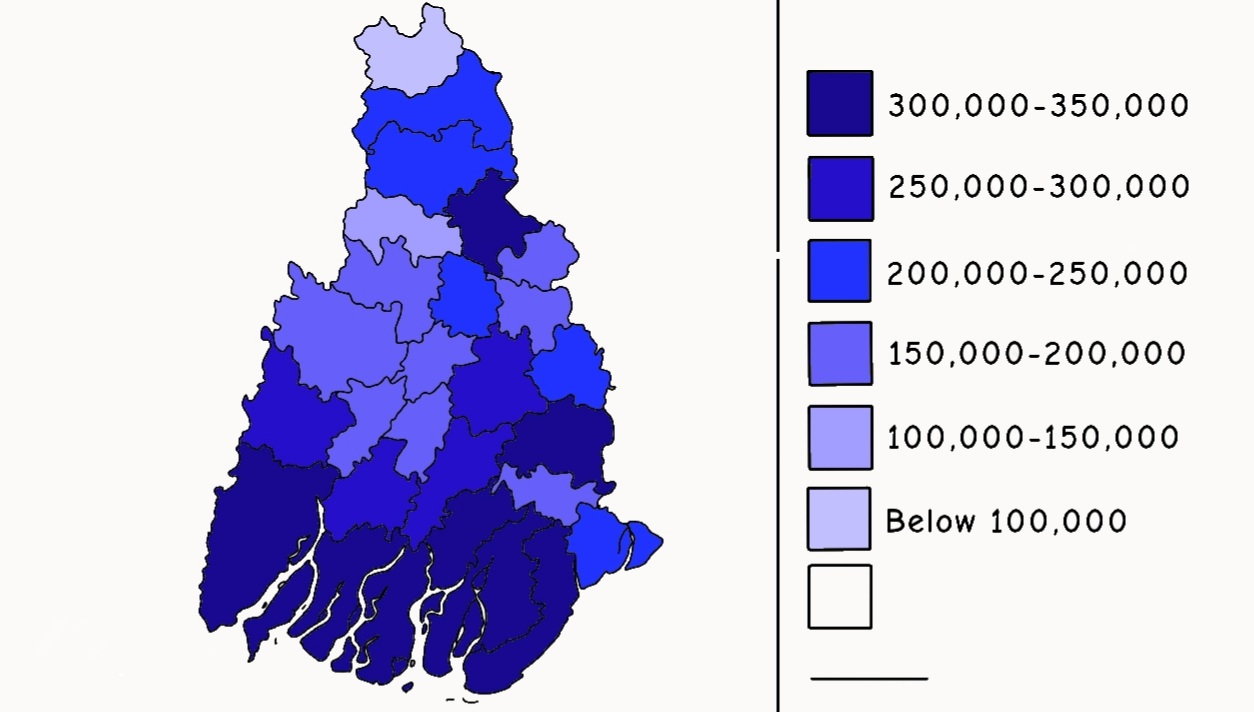
Population of each township as of 2014

=== Ethnic makeup ===
Ethnic composition of Ayeyarwady Region
Ethnic group	Percentage
Bamar	76.7%
Karen	21.5%
Other	1.8%
Source: 2019 GAD township reports

The Bamar 4,873,027 (76.98%) make up the majority of the region's population, while the Karen 1,426,973 (22.5%) form a significant minority. A small minority of Rakhine (0.47%) live in western coastal regions.

After the 2014 Census in Myanmar, the Burmese government indefinitely withheld release of detailed ethnicity data, citing concerns around political and social concerns surrounding the issue of ethnicity in Myanmar. In 2022, researchers published an analysis of the General Administration Department's nationwide 2018-2019 township reports to tabulate the ethnic makeup of the region.

=== Religion ===
Religion in Ayeyarwady Region (2014)
1. Buddhism (92.1%)
2. Christianity (6.30%)
3. Islam (1.40%)
4. Other religion (0.10%)
5. Hinduism (0.10%)

According to the 2014 Myanmar Census, Buddhists make up 92.2% of Ayeyawady Region's population, forming the largest religious community there. Minority religious communities include Christians (6.3%), Muslims (1.4%), and Hindus (0.1%) who collectively comprise the remainder of Ayeyawady Region's population. 0.1% of the population listed no religion, other religions, or were otherwise not enumerated.

According to the State Sangha Maha Nayaka Committee's 2016 statistics, 42,494 Buddhist monks were registered in Ayeyawady Region, comprising 7.9% of Myanmar's total Sangha membership, which includes both novice samanera and fully-ordained bhikkhu. The majority of monks belong to the Thudhamma Nikaya (80.1%), followed by Shwegyin Nikaya (8.3%), with the remainder of monks belonging to other small monastic orders. 5,520 thilashin were registered in Ayeyawady Region, comprising 9.1% of Myanmar's total thilashin community.

== Economy ==
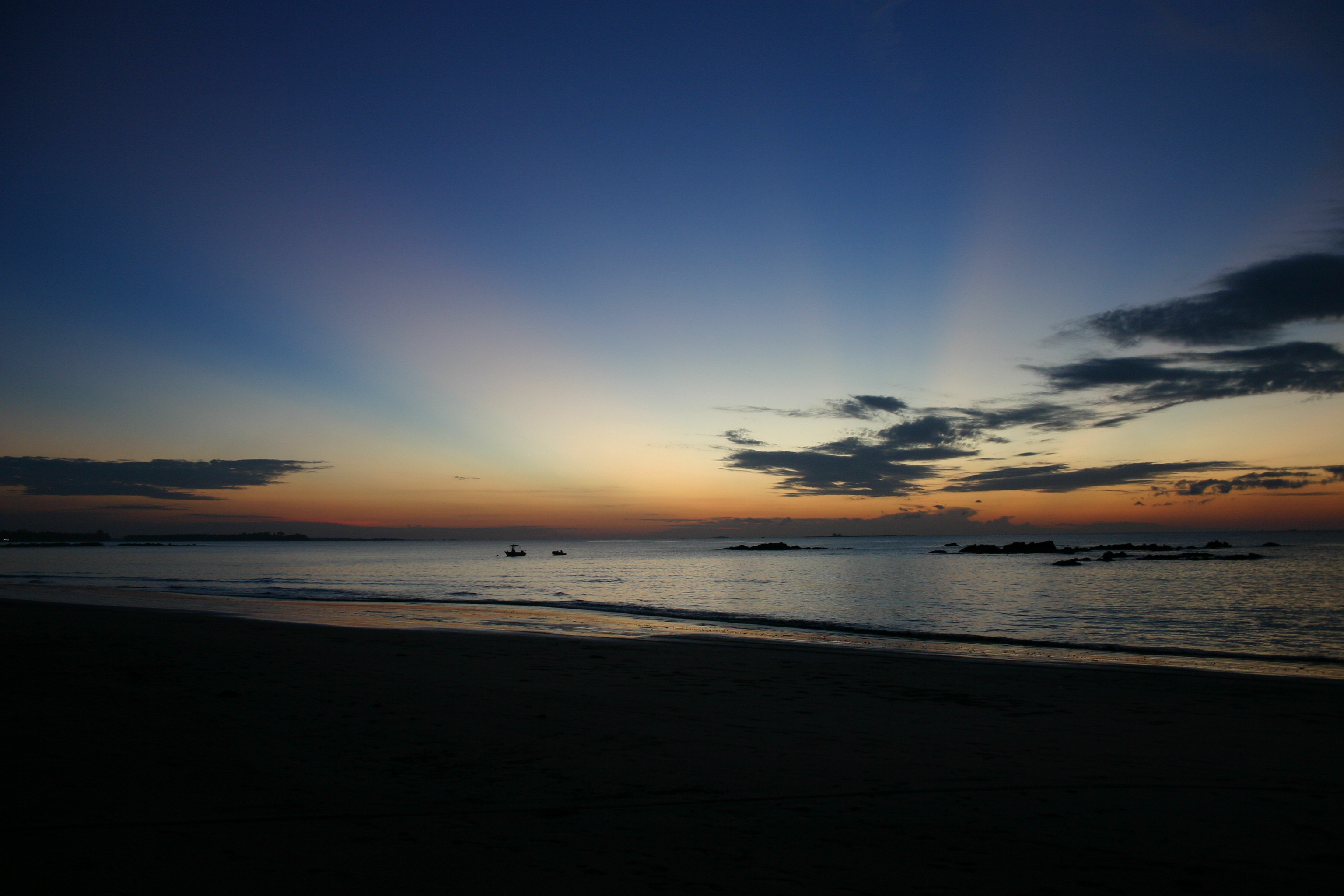
Chaungtha Beach is an important tourist destination in Ayeyarwady Region.

Ayeyarwady Region is heavily forested and wood products are an important component of the economy. The principal crop of Ayeyarwady Region is rice, and the region is called the "granary of Burma". In addition to rice, other crops include maize, sesame, groundnut, sunflower, beans, pulses, and jute. Fishery is also important; Ayeyarwady Region produces fish, prawn, fish-paste, dry fish, dry prawn, and fish sauce.

Despite the importance of agriculture to the region, landlessness is high in rural households. Most farms are small; nearly half are under 5 acres. Rice paddy agriculture is dominant during the monsoon but irrigation is limited, especially in smaller farms, during the dry season. Seeds are sourced from own reserves rather than from specialized traders. Yields from farms average 3.3 tons per hectare, lower than other Asian countries.

Ayeyarwady Region also has considerable tourist potential. The city of Pathein has numerous historic sights and temples. Outside Pathein are the beach resorts of Chaungtha Beach and the lake resort of Inye Lake. Inye lake is located in Kyonpyaw township, 59 miles (95 km) north east of Pathein. Inye lake is also well known for fishery, as the major supplier of fresh water fish. Chaungtha is located in Pathein township. However, hotel and transportation infrastructure is still very poorly developed.

== Transportation ==
=== Air ===
Ayeyarwady Region is served by Pathein Airport.

=== Bridges ===
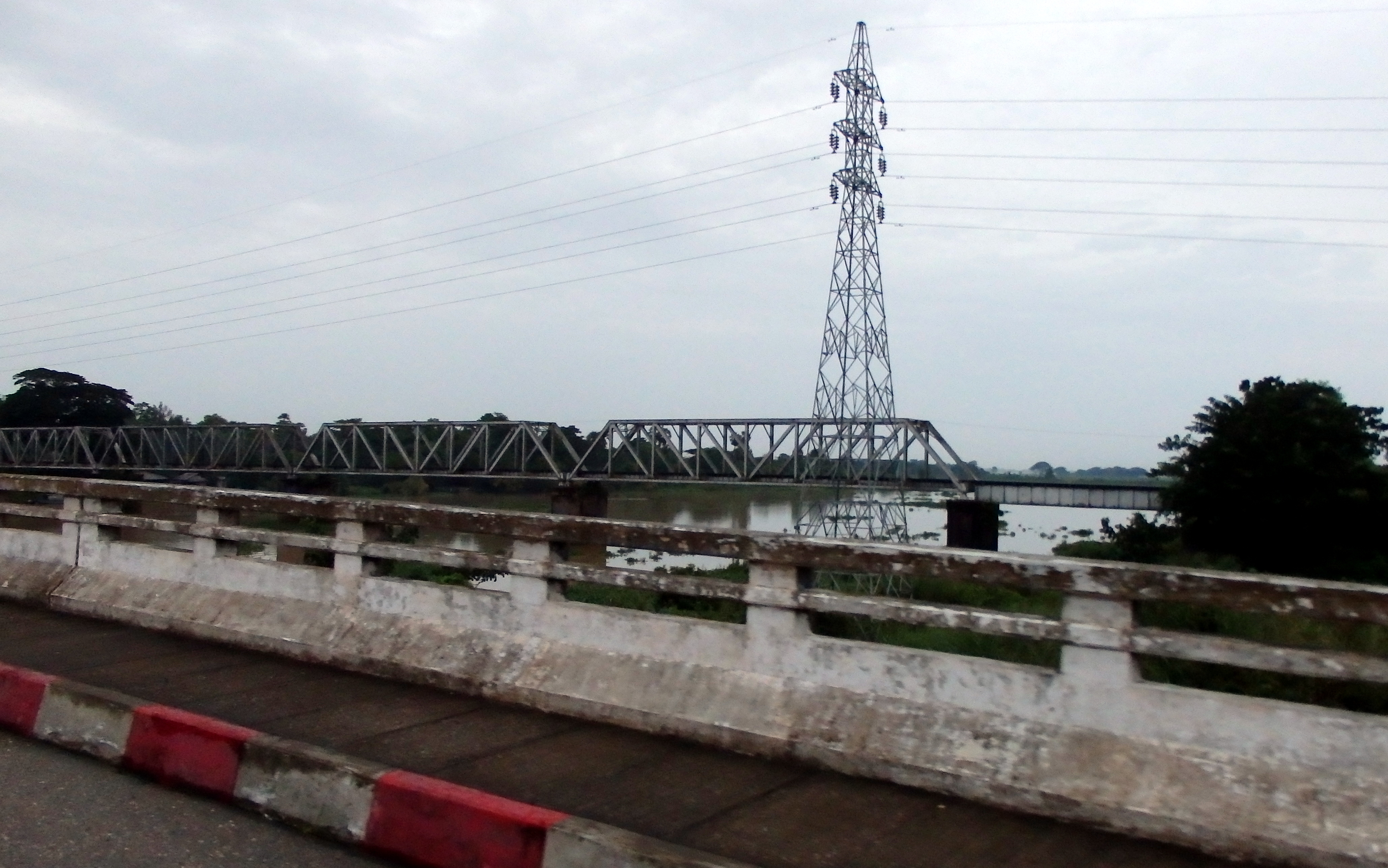
Daka Bridge, Kangyidaunt Township

- Bo Myat Tun Bridge (Nyaungdon)
- Daydalu Bridge (Pyapon)
- Daka Bridge (Kangyidaunt and Kyaunggon)
- Dedaye Bridge (Kungyangon Township in Yangon Region and Dedaye Township in Ayeyawady Region)
- Gonnhindan Bridge
- Kanyin Bridge (Mezaligone)
- Khattiya Bridge (Maubin)
- Kyauk Chaung Gyi Bridge (Pathein)
- Kyungon Bridge
- Labutta Bridge
- Maubin Bridge (Maubin)
- Maung Bi Wa Bridge (Pathein)
- Mayan Ngu Bridge (Myaungmya)
- Myaungmya Bridge (Myaungmya)
- Natchaung Bridge (Bogalay)
- Nga Wun Bridge (Myokwin)(Ingapu)
- Ngathaingchaung Bridge
- Pinlelay Bridge
- Seikma Bridge (Bogalay)
- Shwelaung Bridge
- Thegon Bridge (Pantanaw)
- Uto Bridge
- Wakema Bridge

== Education ==
Educational opportunities in Myanmar are extremely limited outside the main cities of Yangon and Mandalay. According to official statistics, less than 10% of primary school students in the division reach high school.

AY 2002–2003	Primary	Middle	High
Schools	5623	270	102
Teachers	17,600	5700	1800
Students	708,000	181,000	61,000

Pathein University is the main university in the state, and until recently the only four-year university in the state. In recent years, the military government, which closed down universities and colleges in the 1990s to quell student unrest, has "upgraded" former colleges and two-year institutes. The government now requires that students attend their local universities and colleges, such as Hinthada University and Maubin University.

== Health care ==
The general state of health care in Myanmar is poor. The military government spends anywhere from 0.5% to 3% of the country's GDP on health care, consistently ranking among the lowest in the world. Although health care is nominally free, in reality, patients have to pay for medicine and treatment, even in public clinics and hospitals. Public hospitals lack many of the basic facilities and equipment. Moreover, the health care infrastructure outside of Yangon and Mandalay is extremely poor. For example, in 2003, Ayeyarwady Region had less than a quarter of hospital beds than Yangon Region although Ayeyarwady Region had a slightly greater population.

2002–2003	# Hospitals	# Beds
Specialist hospitals	0	0
General hospitals with specialist services	2	450
General hospitals	24	910
Health clinics	45	720
Total	71	2080
