= List of townships of Myanmar by total fertility rate =

This is a list of townships and districts of Myanmar by total fertility rate in 2014.

== List ==
State/Region	District	Township	Total Fertility Rate
Union	-	-	2.51
Kachin	-	-	3.04
Kachin	Myitkyina	-	3.07
Kachin	Myitkyina	Myitkyina	2.69
Kachin	Myitkyina	Waingmaw	3.39
Kachin	Myitkyina	Ingyanyan	6.86
Kachin	Myitkyina	Tanaing	3.12
Kachin	Myitkyina	Chiphwe	5.29
Kachin	Myitkyina	Hsotlaw	5.97
Kachin	Myitkyina	Hsinbo (Sub-Tsp)	3.37
Kachin	Myitkyina	Hsadone (Sub-Tsp)	4.88
Kachin	Myitkyina	Kanpaikti (Sub-Tsp)	3.42
Kachin	Myitkyina	Shinbwayyan (Sub-Tsp)	3.71
Kachin	Myitkyina	Panwa (Sub-Tsp)	5.05
Kachin	Mohnyin	-	2.92
Kachin	Mohnyin	Mohnyin	2.95
Kachin	Mohnyin	Mogaung	2.90
Kachin	Mohnyin	Phakant	3.04
Kachin	Mohnyin	Hopin (Sub-Tsp)	2.17
Kachin	Mohnyin	Kamine (Sub-Tsp)	3.99
Kachin	Bhamo	-	2.77
Kachin	Bhamo	Bhamo	2.62
Kachin	Bhamo	Shwegu	2.85
Kachin	Bhamo	Momauk	2.88
Kachin	Bhamo	Mansi	2.81
Kachin	Bhamo	Myohla (Sub-Tsp)	3.55
Kachin	Bhamo	Lwe'ge' (Sub-Tsp)	2.10
Kachin	Bhamo	Dotphoneyan (Sub-Tsp)	3.55
Kachin	Putao	-	4.90
Kachin	Putao	Putao	4.75
Kachin	Putao	Sumprabum	5.61
Kachin	Putao	Machanbaw	5.47
Kachin	Putao	Khaunglanphoo	4.94
Kachin	Putao	Naungmoon	5.52
Kachin	Putao	Pannandin (Sub-Tsp)	7.06
Kayah	-	-	3.51
Kayah	Loikaw	-	3.46
Kayah	Loikaw	Loikaw	2.70
Kayah	Loikaw	Dimawso	4.19
Kayah	Loikaw	Phruso	5.00
Kayah	Loikaw	Shardaw	4.33
Kayah	Bawlakhe	-	3.78
Kayah	Bawlakhe	Bawlakhe	3.29
Kayah	Bawlakhe	Parsaung	4.02
Kayah	Bawlakhe	Meisi	3.88
Kayah	Bawlakhe	Ywathit (Sub-Tsp)	2.87
Kayin	-	-	3.37
Kayin	Hpa-an	-	3.38
Kayin	Hpa-an	Hpa-an	2.88
Kayin	Hpa-an	Hlaingbwe	3.36
Kayin	Hpa-an	Thandaunggyi	4.06
Kayin	Hpa-an	Paingkyon (Sub-Tsp)	3.65
Kayin	Hpa-an	Shan Ywathit (Sub-Tsp)	5.69
Kayin	Hpa-an	Leiktho (Sub-Tsp)	5.43
Kayin	Hpa-an	Bawgali (Sub-Tsp)	3.92
Kayin	Pharpon	-	3.95
Kayin	Pharpon	Pharpon	4.03
Kayin	Pharpon	Kamamaung (Sub-Tsp)	3.90
Kayin	Myawady	-	3.06
Kayin	Myawady	Myawady	2.96
Kayin	Myawady	Sugali (Sub-Tsp)	4.78
Kayin	Myawady	Wawlaymyaing (Sub-Tsp)	4.19
Kayin	Kawkareik	-	3.48
Kayin	Kawkareik	Kawkareik	2.94
Kayin	Kawkareik	Kyarinseikkyi	3.49
Kayin	Kawkareik	Payarthonezu (Sub-Tsp)	3.80
Kayin	Kawkareik	Kyaidon (Sub-Tsp)	4.90
Chin	-	-	5.00
Chin	Hakha	-	4.15
Chin	Hakha	Hakha	3.54
Chin	Hakha	Thantlang	4.78
Chin	Falam	-	4.78
Chin	Falam	Falam	4.37
Chin	Falam	Tedim	4.91
Chin	Falam	Tonzaung	5.44
Chin	Falam	Rihkhuadal (Sub-Tsp)	3.60
Chin	Falam	Cikha (Sub-Tsp)	4.82
Chin	Mindat	-	5.57
Chin	Mindat	Mindat	5.64
Chin	Mindat	Matupi	5.30
Chin	Mindat	Kanpalet	6.00
Chin	Mindat	Paletwa	5.01
Chin	Mindat	Reazu (Sub-Tsp)	5.01
Chin	Mindat	Sami (Sub-Tsp)	6.92
Sagaing	-	-	2.45
Sagaing	Sagaing	-	1.90
Sagaing	Sagaing	Sagaing	1.95
Sagaing	Sagaing	Myinmu	1.70
Sagaing	Sagaing	Myaung	1.96
Sagaing	Shwebo	-	2.21
Sagaing	Shwebo	Shwebo	1.96
Sagaing	Shwebo	Khin U	2.12
Sagaing	Shwebo	Wetlet	1.90
Sagaing	Shwebo	Kambalu	2.45
Sagaing	Shwebo	Kyunhla	2.49
Sagaing	Shwebo	Ye U	2.19
Sagaing	Shwebo	Depayin	2.45
Sagaing	Shwebo	Tasei	2.34
Sagaing	Shwebo	Kyaukmyaung (Sub-Tsp)	1.75
Sagaing	Monywa	-	1.93
Sagaing	Monywa	Monywa	1.88
Sagaing	Monywa	Butalin	2.14
Sagaing	Monywa	Ayartaw	1.94
Sagaing	Monywa	Chaung Oo	1.86
Sagaing	Katha	-	2.76
Sagaing	Katha	Katha	2.92
Sagaing	Katha	Indaw	2.56
Sagaing	Katha	Tigyaing	2.70
Sagaing	Katha	Banmauk	3.50
Sagaing	Katha	Kawlin	2.14
Sagaing	Katha	Wuntho	2.56
Sagaing	Katha	Pinlebu	3.09
Sagaing	Kalay	-	2.60
Sagaing	Kalay	Kalay	2.61
Sagaing	Kalay	Kalewa	2.38
Sagaing	Kalay	Mingin	2.65
Sagaing	Tamu	-	3.41
Sagaing	Tamu	Tamu	2.89
Sagaing	Tamu	Myothit (Sub-Tsp)	4.48
Sagaing	Tamu	Khampat (Sub-Tsp)	3.86
Sagaing	Mawlaik	-	3.25
Sagaing	Mawlaik	Mawlaik	2.63
Sagaing	Mawlaik	Phaungpyin	3.55
Sagaing	Hkamti	-	4.78
Sagaing	Hkamti	Hkamti	3.73
Sagaing	Hkamti	Homalin	4.37
Sagaing	Hkamti	Leshi	5.27
Sagaing	Hkamti	Lahe	6.14
Sagaing	Hkamti	Nanyun	4.32
Sagaing	Hkamti	Mobaingluk (Sub-Tsp)	4.62
Sagaing	Hkamti	Sonemara (Sub-Tsp)	5.73
Sagaing	Hkamti	Htanparkway (Sub-Tsp)	6.04
Sagaing	Hkamti	Pansaung (Sub-Tsp)	5.94
Sagaing	Hkamti	Donhee (Sub-Tsp)	6.85
Sagaing	Yinmarpin	-	2.12
Sagaing	Yinmarpin	Yinmarpin	2.04
Sagaing	Yinmarpin	Salingyi	1.86
Sagaing	Yinmarpin	Palae	2.26
Sagaing	Yinmarpin	Kani	2.32
Tanintharyi	-	-	3.31
Tanintharyi	Dawei	-	2.94
Tanintharyi	Dawei	Dawei	2.29
Tanintharyi	Dawei	Lounglon	2.87
Tanintharyi	Dawei	Thayetchaung	3.19
Tanintharyi	Dawei	Yebyu	3.26
Tanintharyi	Dawei	Myitta (Sub-Tsp)	4.03
Tanintharyi	Dawei	Kaleinaung (Sub-Tsp)	3.57
Tanintharyi	Myeik	-	3.42
Tanintharyi	Myeik	Myeik	2.77
Tanintharyi	Myeik	Kyunsu	4.26
Tanintharyi	Myeik	Palaw	3.09
Tanintharyi	Myeik	Tanintharyi	3.97
Tanintharyi	Myeik	Palauk (Sub-Tsp)	4.25
Tanintharyi	Kawthoung	-	3.77
Tanintharyi	Kawthoung	Kawthoung	3.13
Tanintharyi	Kawthoung	Bokepyin	4.63
Tanintharyi	Kawthoung	Khamaukkyi (Sub-Tsp)	4.07
Tanintharyi	Kawthoung	Pyigyimandaing (Sub-Tsp)	4.72
Tanintharyi	Kawthoung	Karathuri (Sub-Tsp)	4.63
Bago	-	-	2.36
Bago	Bago	-	2.62
Bago	Bago	Bago	2.24
Bago	Bago	Tanatpin	2.91
Bago	Bago	Kawa	2.80
Bago	Bago	Waw	2.88
Bago	Bago	Nyaunglebin	2.45
Bago	Bago	Kyauktaga	2.83
Bago	Bago	Daik U	2.56
Bago	Bago	Shwegyin	3.32
Bago	Toungoo	-	2.63
Bago	Toungoo	Toungoo	2.27
Bago	Toungoo	Yaedashe	2.66
Bago	Toungoo	Kyaukkyi	3.48
Bago	Toungoo	Pyu	2.61
Bago	Toungoo	Oatwin	2.64
Bago	Toungoo	Htantapin	2.66
Bago	Pyay	-	1.76
Bago	Pyay	Pyay	1.67
Bago	Pyay	Paukkhaung	2.06
Bago	Pyay	Padaung	1.76
Bago	Pyay	Paunde	1.72
Bago	Pyay	Thegon	1.53
Bago	Pyay	Shwedaung	1.88
Bago	Thayawady	-	2.20
Bago	Thayawady	Thayawady	2.41
Bago	Thayawady	Letpadan	2.57
Bago	Thayawady	Minhla	2.23
Bago	Thayawady	Okpo	2.36
Bago	Thayawady	Zigon	1.94
Bago	Thayawady	Nattalin	1.90
Bago	Thayawady	Monyo	2.23
Bago	Thayawady	Gyobingauk	1.74
Magway	-	-	2.29
Magway	Magway	-	2.34
Magway	Magway	Magway	2.08
Magway	Magway	Yenangyoung	2.38
Magway	Magway	Chauk	2.21
Magway	Magway	Taungdwingyi	2.34
Magway	Magway	Myothit	2.73
Magway	Magway	Natmauk	2.51
Magway	Minbu	-	2.30
Magway	Minbu	Minbu	2.13
Magway	Minbu	Pwint Phyu	2.30
Magway	Minbu	Ngape	2.63
Magway	Minbu	Salin	2.34
Magway	Minbu	Saytottara	2.49
Magway	Thayet	-	2.05
Magway	Thayet	Thayet	1.80
Magway	Thayet	Minhla	2.01
Magway	Thayet	Mindon	1.94
Magway	Thayet	Kamma	1.85
Magway	Thayet	Aunglan	2.12
Magway	Thayet	Sinpaungwe'	2.37
Magway	Pakokku	-	2.47
Magway	Pakokku	Pakokku	2.31
Magway	Pakokku	Yesagyo	2.23
Magway	Pakokku	Myaing	2.56
Magway	Pakokku	Pauk	2.65
Magway	Pakokku	Seikphyu	2.93
Magway	Gangaw	-	1.97
Magway	Gangaw	Gangaw	2.02
Magway	Gangaw	Htilin	1.84
Magway	Gangaw	Saw	2.06
Magway	Gangaw	Kyaukhtu (Sub-Tsp)	1.81
Mandalay	-	-	2.12
Mandalay	Mandalay	-	1.87
Mandalay	Mandalay	Aungmyetharzan	1.68
Mandalay	Mandalay	Chanayetharzan	1.41
Mandalay	Mandalay	Mahaaungmye	1.67
Mandalay	Mandalay	Chanmyatharzi	1.80
Mandalay	Mandalay	Pyigyidagun	2.19
Mandalay	Mandalay	Amarapura	1.82
Mandalay	Mandalay	Patheingyi	2.44
Mandalay	Pyin Oo Lwin	-	2.51
Mandalay	Pyin Oo Lwin	Pyin Oo Lwin	2.00
Mandalay	Pyin Oo Lwin	Madaya	2.52
Mandalay	Pyin Oo Lwin	Sinku	2.64
Mandalay	Pyin Oo Lwin	Mogok	2.54
Mandalay	Pyin Oo Lwin	Thabeikkyin	3.19
Mandalay	Pyin Oo Lwin	Tagaung (Sub-Tsp)	3.19
Mandalay	Kyaukse	-	2.16
Mandalay	Kyaukse	Kyaukse	2.22
Mandalay	Kyaukse	Singaing	1.95
Mandalay	Kyaukse	Myitthar	2.26
Mandalay	Kyaukse	Tada U	2.15
Mandalay	Myingyan	-	2.09
Mandalay	Myingyan	Myingyan	1.92
Mandalay	Myingyan	Taungtha	2.28
Mandalay	Myingyan	Natogyi	2.03
Mandalay	Myingyan	Kyaukpadaung	2.13
Mandalay	Myingyan	Ngazun	2.16
Mandalay	Nyaung U	-	1.87
Mandalay	Nyaung U	Nyaung U	1.85
Mandalay	Nyaung U	Ngathayauk (Sub-Tsp)	1.95
Mandalay	Yame'thin	-	2.25
Mandalay	Yame'thin	Yame'thin	2.21
Mandalay	Yame'thin	Pyawbwe	2.28
Mandalay	Meiktila	-	2.18
Mandalay	Meiktila	Meiktila	2.14
Mandalay	Meiktila	Mahlaing	2.09
Mandalay	Meiktila	Thazi	2.51
Mandalay	Meiktila	Wundwin	1.98
Mon	-	-	2.52
Mon	Mawlamyine	-	2.33
Mon	Mawlamyine	Mawlamyine	1.88
Mon	Mawlamyine	Kyaikemaraw	2.71
Mon	Mawlamyine	Chaungzon	2.22
Mon	Mawlamyine	Thanbyuzayat	2.42
Mon	Mawlamyine	Mudon	2.12
Mon	Mawlamyine	Ye	2.61
Mon	Mawlamyine	Lamine (Sub-Tsp)	2.89
Mon	Mawlamyine	Khawzar (Sub-Tsp)	2.70
Mon	Thaton	-	2.83
Mon	Thaton	Thaton	2.73
Mon	Thaton	Paung	2.57
Mon	Thaton	Kyaikto	2.96
Mon	Thaton	Bilin	3.10
Rakhine	-	-	2.76
Rakhine	Sittwe	-	2.61
Rakhine	Sittwe	Sittwe	2.02
Rakhine	Sittwe	Ponnagyun	2.82
Rakhine	Sittwe	Pauktaw	3.02
Rakhine	Sittwe	Yathedaung	2.63
Rakhine	Myauk U	-	2.83
Rakhine	Myauk U	Myauk U	2.66
Rakhine	Myauk U	Kyauktaw	2.54
Rakhine	Myauk U	Minbya	3.07
Rakhine	Myauk U	Myebon	3.19
Rakhine	Maungtaw	-	3.38
Rakhine	Maungtaw	Maungtaw	3.15
Rakhine	Maungtaw	Buthidaung	3.49
Rakhine	Maungtaw	Taungpyoletwe (Sub-Tsp)	4.13
Rakhine	Kyaukpyu	-	2.97
Rakhine	Kyaukpyu	Kyaukpyu	3.01
Rakhine	Kyaukpyu	Mannaung	2.03
Rakhine	Kyaukpyu	Yanbye	2.76
Rakhine	Kyaukpyu	An	3.48
Rakhine	Thandwe	-	2.50
Rakhine	Thandwe	Thandwe	2.10
Rakhine	Thandwe	Taungup	2.79
Rakhine	Thandwe	Gwa	2.55
Rakhine	Thandwe	Maei (Sub-Tsp)	3.18
Rakhine	Thandwe	Kyeintali (Sub-Tsp)	2.05
Yangon	-	-	1.85
Yangon	North Yangon	-	1.97
Yangon	North Yangon	Insein	1.65
Yangon	North Yangon	Mingaladon	1.74
Yangon	North Yangon	Hmawby	2.21
Yangon	North Yangon	Hlegu	2.38
Yangon	North Yangon	Taikkyi	2.34
Yangon	North Yangon	Htantabin	2.47
Yangon	North Yangon	Shwepyitha	1.76
Yangon	North Yangon	Hlinethaya	1.92
Yangon	East Yangon	-	1.65
Yangon	East Yangon	Thingangyun	1.32
Yangon	East Yangon	Yankin	1.26
Yangon	East Yangon	South Okkalapa	1.31
Yangon	East Yangon	North Okkalapa	1.65
Yangon	East Yangon	Thakayta	1.50
Yangon	East Yangon	Dawbon	1.75
Yangon	East Yangon	Tamway	1.35
Yangon	East Yangon	Pazuntaung	1.24
Yangon	East Yangon	Botahtaung	1.22
Yangon	East Yangon	Dagon Myothit (South)	2.02
Yangon	East Yangon	Dagon Myothit (North)	1.55
Yangon	East Yangon	Dagon Myothit (East)	2.11
Yangon	East Yangon	Dagon Myothit (Seikkan)	2.21
Yangon	East Yangon	Mingala Taungnyunt	1.50
Yangon	South Yangon	-	2.36
Yangon	South Yangon	Thanlyin	2.16
Yangon	South Yangon	Kyauktan	2.23
Yangon	South Yangon	Thongwa	2.12
Yangon	South Yangon	Khayan	2.46
Yangon	South Yangon	Twantay	2.70
Yangon	South Yangon	Kawhmu	2.30
Yangon	South Yangon	Kungyangon	2.56
Yangon	South Yangon	Dala	2.38
Yangon	South Yangon	Seikkyi/Khanaungto	2.46
Yangon	South Yangon	Cocogyun	1.85
Yangon	South Yangon	Tada (Sub-Tsp)	2.16
Yangon	West Yangon	-	1.33
Yangon	West Yangon	Kyauktada	1.27
Yangon	West Yangon	Pabedan	1.47
Yangon	West Yangon	Lanmadaw	0.94
Yangon	West Yangon	Latha	0.93
Yangon	West Yangon	Ahlon	1.33
Yangon	West Yangon	Kyimyindine	1.76
Yangon	West Yangon	Sangyoung	1.08
Yangon	West Yangon	Hline	1.19
Yangon	West Yangon	Kamayut	1.22
Yangon	West Yangon	Mayangon	1.54
Yangon	West Yangon	Dagon	1.22
Yangon	West Yangon	Bahan	1.22
Yangon	West Yangon	Seikkan	2.19
Shan	-	-	3.07
Shan	Taunggyi	-	2.72
Shan	Taunggyi	Taunggyi	2.20
Shan	Taunggyi	Nyaungshwe	2.42
Shan	Taunggyi	Hopon	2.94
Shan	Taunggyi	Hsihseng	3.72
Shan	Taunggyi	Kalaw	2.69
Shan	Taunggyi	Pindaya	2.40
Shan	Taunggyi	Ywarngan	2.26
Shan	Taunggyi	Yatsauk	2.48
Shan	Taunggyi	Pinlaung	2.86
Shan	Taunggyi	Phekon	4.06
Shan	Taunggyi	Kyauktalongyi (Sub-Tsp)	2.94
Shan	Taunggyi	Indaw (Sub-Tsp)	3.02
Shan	Taunggyi	Naungtayar (Sub-Tsp)	3.10
Shan	Loilen	-	2.97
Shan	Loilen	Loilin	2.87
Shan	Loilen	Le'char	2.26
Shan	Loilen	Nanhsam (South)	3.00
Shan	Loilen	Kunhing	2.76
Shan	Loilen	Kehsi	2.96
Shan	Loilen	Mongkai	3.48
Shan	Loilen	Mineshu	3.03
Shan	Loilen	Panglong (Sub-Tsp)	3.09
Shan	Loilen	Kholan (Sub-Tsp)	3.35
Shan	Loilen	Karli (Sub-Tsp)	2.35
Shan	Loilen	Minenaung (Sub-Tsp)	3.12
Shan	Loilen	Minesan (Monsan) (Sub-Tsp)	3.09
Shan	Linkhe'	-	2.83
Shan	Linkhe'	Linkhe'	1.41
Shan	Linkhe'	Mone'	3.00
Shan	Linkhe'	Maukme'	4.33
Shan	Linkhe'	Minepan	2.63
Shan	Linkhe'	Homane (Sub-Tsp)	2.76
Shan	Linkhe'	Kengtaung (Sub-Tsp)	2.66
Shan	Lashio	-	2.87
Shan	Lashio	Lashio	2.55
Shan	Lashio	Theinni	2.98
Shan	Lashio	Mineye'	2.89
Shan	Lashio	Tantyan	3.41
Shan	Mu Se	-	2.83
Shan	Mu Se	Mu Se	2.14
Shan	Mu Se	Namkham	2.66
Shan	Mu Se	Kukai	3.43
Shan	Mu Se	Monekoe (Sub-Tsp)	2.77
Shan	Mu Se	Manhero (Manhyo) (Sub-Tsp)	1.78
Shan	Mu Se	Pansai (Kyu Kok) (Sub-Tsp)	2.50
Shan	Mu Se	Tamoenye (Sub-Tsp)	3.88
Shan	Kyaukme	-	2.80
Shan	Kyaukme	Kyaukme	2.38
Shan	Kyaukme	Naungkhio	2.48
Shan	Kyaukme	Hsipaw	2.74
Shan	Kyaukme	Namtu	2.93
Shan	Kyaukme	Namsan (North)	3.28
Shan	Kyaukme	Momeik	2.73
Shan	Kyaukme	Mabane	2.42
Shan	Kyaukme	Manton	4.75
Shan	Kyaukme	Minengaw (Sub-Tsp)	3.79
Shan	Kyaukme	Minelon (Sub-Tsp)	3.11
Shan	Kunlon	-	4.29
Shan	Kunlon	Kunlon	4.29
Shan	Laukine	-	3.39
Shan	Laukine	Laukine	3.29
Shan	Laukine	Kongyan	4.65
Shan	Laukine	Chinshwehaw (Sub-Tsp)	2.85
Shan	Laukine	Mawhtike (Sub-Tsp)	2.32
Shan	Hopan	-	4.93
Shan	Hopan	Hopan	3.33
Shan	Hopan	Minemaw	5.26
Shan	Hopan	Panwine	5.94
Shan	Hopan	Panlon (Sub-Tsp)	3.75
Shan	Makman	-	5.02
Shan	Makman	Makman	4.74
Shan	Makman	Pan San (Pan Kham)	3.92
Shan	Makman	Naphang	6.22
Shan	Makman	ManKan (Sub-Tsp)	6.26
Shan	Kengtung	-	3.20
Shan	Kengtung	Kengtung	3.26
Shan	Kengtung	Minekat	3.63
Shan	Kengtung	Mineyan	2.75
Shan	Kengtung	Minelar	2.50
Shan	Kengtung	MinePauk (Sub-Tsp)	3.50
Shan	Minesat	-	4.67
Shan	Minesat	Minesat	5.04
Shan	Minesat	Minepyin	4.23
Shan	Minesat	Minetung	4.14
Shan	Minesat	Minekoke (Sub-Tsp)	5.39
Shan	Minesat	Tontar (Sub-Tsp)	4.35
Shan	Minesat	Ponparkyin (Sub-Tsp)	4.49
Shan	Minesat	Monehta (Sub-Tsp)	6.03
Shan	Tachileik	-	2.49
Shan	Tachileik	Tachileik	2.37
Shan	Tachileik	Talay (Sub-Tsp)	3.42
Shan	Tachileik	Kenglat (Sub-Tsp)	3.00
Shan	Minephyat	-	2.91
Shan	Minephyat	Minephyat	3.88
Shan	Minephyat	Mineyaung	2.45
Shan	Minephyat	Mineyu (Sub-Tsp)	2.62
Ayeyawady	-	-	2.81
Ayeyawady	Pathein	-	2.64
Ayeyawady	Pathein	Kangyidaunt	2.74
Ayeyawady	Pathein	Kyaungon	2.66
Ayeyawady	Pathein	Kyonpyaw	2.84
Ayeyawady	Pathein	Ngaputaw	3.05
Ayeyawady	Pathein	Pathein	2.11
Ayeyawady	Pathein	Yekyi	2.41
Ayeyawady	Pathein	Thapaung	2.91
Ayeyawady	Pathein	Ngayokaung (Sub-Tsp)	2.51
Ayeyawady	Pathein	Hainggyikyun (Sub-Tsp)	2.72
Ayeyawady	Pathein	Shwethaungyan (Sub-Tsp)	2.83
Ayeyawady	Pathein	Ngwehsaung (Sub-Tsp)	2.94
Ayeyawady	Pathein	Ngathaingchaung (Sub-Tsp)	2.52
Ayeyawady	Phyapon	-	3.21
Ayeyawady	Phyapon	Kyaiklatt	3.20
Ayeyawady	Phyapon	Daydaye	2.64
Ayeyawady	Phyapon	Phyapon	2.78
Ayeyawady	Phyapon	Bogale	3.48
Ayeyawady	Phyapon	Ahmar (Sub-Tsp)	4.15
Ayeyawady	Maubin	-	2.76
Ayeyawady	Maubin	Nyaungdon	2.55
Ayeyawady	Maubin	Danubyu	2.46
Ayeyawady	Maubin	Pantanaw	3.01
Ayeyawady	Maubin	Maubin	2.88
Ayeyawady	Myaungmya	-	3.01
Ayeyawady	Myaungmya	Myaungmya	3.01
Ayeyawady	Myaungmya	Wakema	3.11
Ayeyawady	Myaungmya	Einme	2.85
Ayeyawady	Labutta	-	3.33
Ayeyawady	Labutta	Mawlamyinegyun	3.13
Ayeyawady	Labutta	Labutta	3.22
Ayeyawady	Labutta	Pyinsalu (Sub-Tsp)	4.36
Ayeyawady	Hinthada	-	2.30
Ayeyawady	Hinthada	Kyangin	1.60
Ayeyawady	Hinthada	Zalun	2.58
Ayeyawady	Hinthada	Myanaung	2.16
Ayeyawady	Hinthada	Laymyethna	2.64
Ayeyawady	Hinthada	Hinthada	2.30
Ayeyawady	Hinthada	Ingapu	2.41
Nay Pyi Taw	-	-	2.42
Nay Pyi Taw	Ottara (North)	-	2.46
Nay Pyi Taw	Ottara (North)	Tatkon	2.28
Nay Pyi Taw	Ottara (North)	Zeyarthiri	2.44
Nay Pyi Taw	Ottara (North)	Ottarathiri	2.73
Nay Pyi Taw	Ottara (North)	Pobbathiri	2.65
Nay Pyi Taw	Dekkhina (South)	-	2.39
Nay Pyi Taw	Dekkhina (South)	Pyinmana	2.38
Nay Pyi Taw	Dekkhina (South)	Lewe	2.64
Nay Pyi Taw	Dekkhina (South)	Zabuthiri	1.81
Nay Pyi Taw	Dekkhina (South)	Dekkhinathiri	2.26

== See also ==
- Demographics of Myanmar
