= Kyungon Bridge =

Bridge in Ayeyarwady Region, Myanmar

Coordinates: 16°41′53″N 95°9′12″E

The Kyungon Bridge is a bridge on the Wakema–Kyungon–Myinkaseik–Pathein Road across the Pyamalaw River between Wakema Township and Einme Township in Ayeyawady Region of Burma (Myanmar). The one-way bridge is a Bailey suspension bridge with a span of 787 feet (240 m) but only 14 feet (4.3 m) wide.

Using the Kyungon Bridge to travel from Wakema to Pathein, it is only 55.4 miles (89 km) and thus is the shortest route from Wakema to Pathein. The route through Kangalay is 92 miles (148 km) long and the route through Einme is 86 miles (138 km) long. The bridge was opened on 25 October 2009. The bridge was commissioned on 20 March 2022, by State Administration Council members Aye Nu Sein and Moung Har as part of the 77th Armed Forces Day celebration.
