= Myaungmya Township =

Myaungmya Township မြောင်းမြမြို့နယ်
- Township
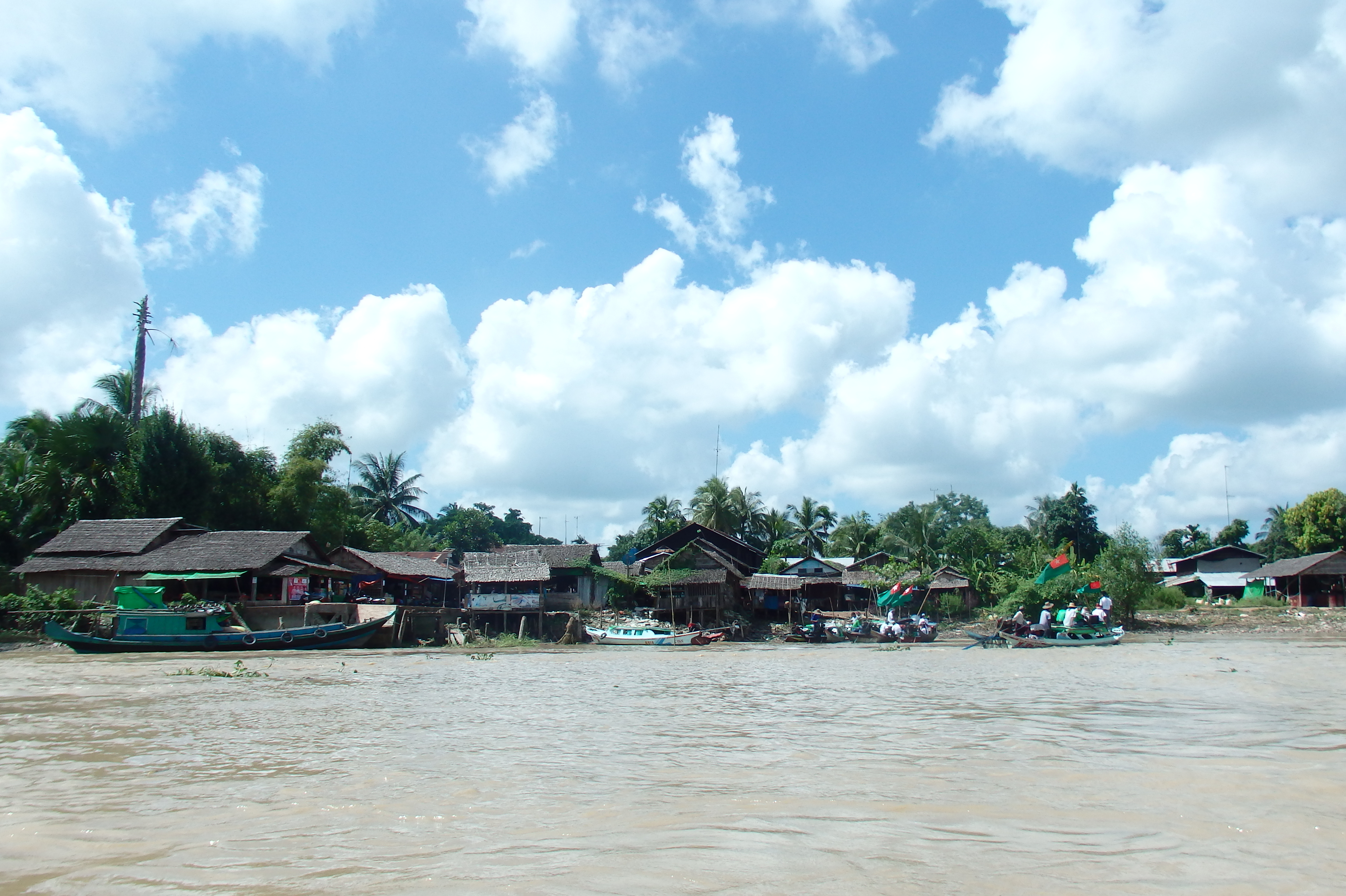

- Location in Myaungmya district (red)
- Coordinates: 16°35′N 94°54′E
- Country: Myanmar
- Division: Ayeyarwady Region
- District: Myaungmya District
- Capital: Myaungmya

Area
  - Total: 444.9 sq mi (1,152.2 km^{2})
- Elevation: 12.678 ft (3.864 m)

Population (2023)
  - Total: 314,880
  - Density: 707.81/sq mi (273.29/km^{2})
  - Ethnicities: Bamar; Karen
- Time zone: UTC+6:30 (MMT)

Myaungmya Township (Burmese: မြောင်းမြမြို့နယ် [mjáʊɰ̃mja̰ mjo̰nɛ̀]) is a township of Myaungmya District in the Ayeyarwady Region of Myanmar. The principal town is Myaungmya.

It has an area of 444.9 square miles (1,152 km^{2}). Myaungmya has high Karen population. Among the population were about 40,739 Christians, mostly Karens. The district is a deltaic tract, bordering south on the sea and traversed by many tidal creeks. Daw Khin Kyi, the wife of national leader General Aung San was born in Myaungmya. The Township is the site of the Myaungmya Incident, the first large-scale armed ethnic clashes between Karens and Burmans in 1942. Rice cultivation and fishing occupy practically all the inhabitants of the district.

Myaungmya Township is located in south-central Ayeyarwady Region and comprises the western portion of Myaungmya District. To its west, it is bordered by the Panmawaddy and Ngawan Rivers and Kangyidaunt Township and Ngapudaw Township across the rivers respectively. To the south, the township borders Labutta Township. To the southeast, across the Pyamalaw River lies Wakema Township. To the northeast, the township borders Einme Township following smaller streams like the Pula and Zagamya streams. Myaungmya Township is divided into 16 wards, 98 village tracts and 492 villages.

== History ==
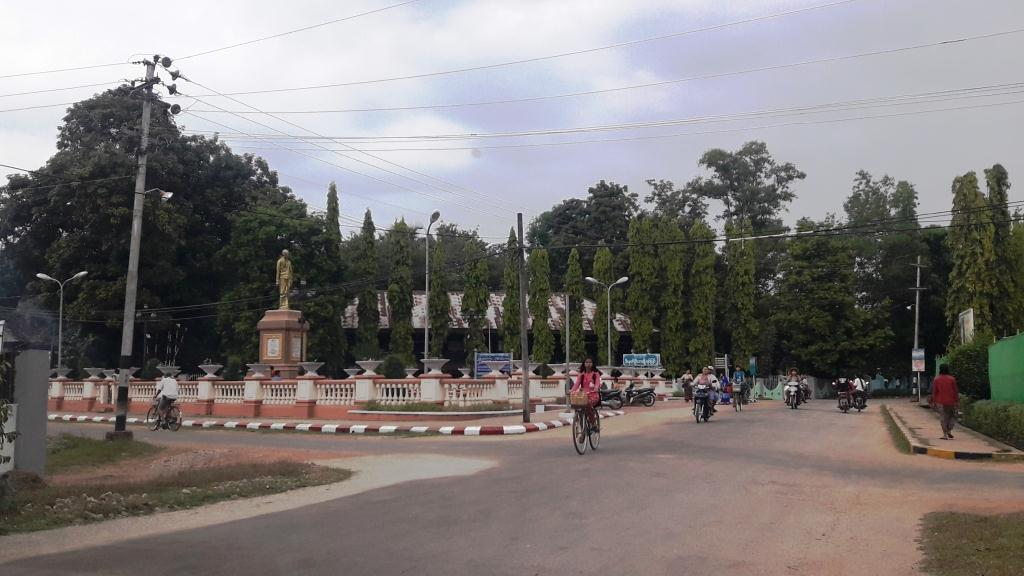
Town of Myaungmya

Myaungmya Township was originally the ancestral homeland of the Mon Nya, a subgroup of the Mon people. It was referenced the Jambūdipa, a text dating to the reign of Kyansittha. The name "Myaungmya" originates from the Mon language name Mongmale (မံၚ်မၠ), lit. 'where the Myaya plants are'. The old town of Myaungmya is an archaeological zone and a heritage preservation zone today.

The Viceroy of Myaungmya, Laukpya, rebelled against the Hanthawaddy kingdom during the reign of Binnya U in 1364 CE. By 1371, he had successfully taken control of the Bassein province and became the ruler of the Irrawaddy Delta as the Viceroy of Bassein-Myaungmya. Myaungmya and other territories held by Laukpya eventually surrendered to Binnya U's successor, Razadarit, after a battlefield loss in 1390.

The Township itself was formed in 1893 out of a portion of Bassein district, and reconstituted until 1903.

The Township was the site of the Myaungmya Incident, one of the first large-scale armed clashes between Burmans and Karens. The incident saw the Burmese Independence Army kill about 5,000 ethnic Karen and destruction of 15-30% of 2,000 villages in the Myaungmya District. The more Buddhist Pwo Karen who suffered from these attacks began to see themselves as part of Karen nationalist causes.

== Geography ==
Myaungmya Township is mostly a flat low-lying delta area. The Thilla Hills lie in the western part of the township with much of that area being characterized by low-lying valleys and deltaic streams. The peaks of the Thilla hills average around 200 ft (60 m). The Township has many prominent waterways including the Panmawaddy, Ngawan and Yway Rivers providing freshwater and transportation pathways. The township has very few wildlife but a diverse abundance of trees including the Pyinkado trees, Eugenia trees, Thitpok trees, Nipa Palms, Showy Silk Cotton trees and various saltwater mangroves.

Myaungmya Township is in a mostly hot and tropical climate with a heavy monsoon presence. The record high in the Township is 42.5 °C (108.5 °F) and the record low was 8 °C (46 °F) due to the sight elevation in the Thilla Hills. In a typical year, the township's temperatures range from 21.1 to 33.3 °C (70.0 to 91.9 °F) with more extreme variation in recent years.

== Demographics ==
Historical population
Year	Myaungmya Township	±%
1973	220,351	—
1983	270,089	+22.6%
2014	298,637	+10.6%
2018	299,370	+0.2%
2019	304,591	+1.7%
2022	313,923	+3.1%
2023	314,880	+0.3%

The 2014 Myanmar Census reported that Myaungmya Township had a population of 298,637. The population density was 259.2 people per km^{2}. The census reported that the median age was 26.7 years, and a sex ratio of 96 males per 100 females. There were 66,172 households; the mean household size was 4.4.

Myaungmya Township is mostly rural with 81.7% of the township living outside of urban centres in 2019.

=== Ethnic makeup ===
Ethnic composition of Myaungmya Township
Ethnic group	Percentage
Bamar	58.8%
Kayin	41.0%
Rakhine	0.1%
Source: 2019 GAD township reports

The Bamar make up the majority of the township's population, while the Karen form the largest minority group.

=== Religion ===
The predominant religion is Buddhism with 84.5% of the township adhering to the faith. Christianity is second with 13.4% (40,719 people) as of 2019. There are also small numbers adherents of Islam and Hinduism within the township. 57.86% of the township is Bamar and 40.33% Karen. Whilst many Christians are ethnic Karen, Buddhist Karen also make up a significant part of the township.

The Myanmar Union Adventist Seminary was founded in and is located in Myaungmya. It is a private Christian college and part of the Seventh-day Adventist education system. The Township also has various Buddhist stupas, including a Shwezigon Pagoda unrelated to the more famous Shwezigon Pagoda in Bagan and a monastic population of 2,301.

== Economy ==
The primary economic activity within the township is agriculture with the major markets of Yangon, Pathein and Labutta accessible by road and waterways. Yangon is also the source for many of the town's consumer goods trade.

The main agricultural product, by far, is rice sent primarily to Yangon and markets in Upper Burma. The off-season sees minimal activity with some peanuts and green peas produced. Besides crops, there are several coconut, cashew and rubber plantations within the township. The town also engages in animal husbandry, including poultry farming and fisheries. To aid in the town's agriculture, the township has various irrigation channels and dams to direct the monsoon rains effectively.

== Notable people ==
- Laukpya, viceroy of Myaungmya in the 14th century Myaungmya-based rebellion against the Hanthawaddy kingdom
- Saw E Binnya, governor of Tari during the same Myaungmya-based rebellion
- Po Sein, an influential 20th-century traditional leading Burmese dance actor, was born in Myaungmya Township.

== See also ==
- List of villages in Myaungmya Township
