= Einme Township =

Einme Township အိမ်မဲမြို့နယ် Pwo Western Karen: အံၩ့မဲဝံးဒီၪ့
- Township
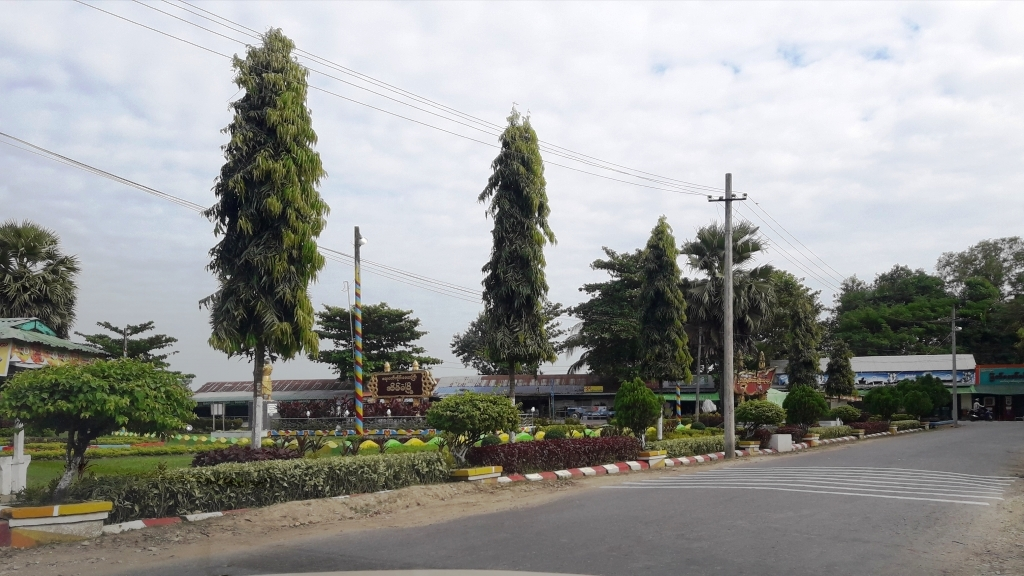

- Location in Myaungmya district
- Coordinates: 16°53′33″N 95°8′29″E
- Country: Myanmar
- Region: Ayeyarwady Region
- District: Myaungmya District
- Capital: Einme

Area
  - Total: 286.67 sq mi (742.47 km^{2})
- Elevation: 14 ft (4.2 m)

Population (2019)
  - Total: 214,162
  - Density: 747.07/sq mi (288.45/km^{2})
  - Ethnicities: Karen; Bamar
- Time zone: UTC+6:30 (MMT)

Einme Township (Burmese: အိမ်မဲမြို့နယ်, MLCTS: im mai: mrui. nai; [ʔèɪɰ̃ mɛ́ mjo̰ nɛ̀], Pwo Western Karen: အံၩ့မဲဝံးဒီၪ့ /ʔéiɴ mâi wêiɴ ɗàuɴ/) is a township of Myaungmya District in the Ayeyarwady Region of Myanmar. The area is believed to be where the Battle of Naungyo took place in 1539. Einme Township is one of the few townships in the Bamar-majority regions of Myanmar that is not Bamar majority itself. Instead, Karen people comprise 52.62% of the township’s population. The principal town is Einme.

Einme Township is located in south-central Ayeyarwady Region and comprises the northern portion of Myaungmya District. To its west, Einme Township is bordered by the Panmawaddy River and the Pathein District townships of Kangyidaunt Township and Kyaunggon Township. To the northeast, the township borders Pantanaw Township and Ma-ubin District. The township's eastern border follows the Pyamalaw River with Wakema Township beyond it. Myaungmya Township forms the south and southwest border following a few smaller streams like the Pula and Zagamya streams. Einme Township is divided into 5 wards, 97 village tracts and 505 villages.

== Geography ==
Einme Township is a mostly flat low-lying delta area and has several streams and rivers flowing north to south through the town. The average freshwater stream in the township has a hot season depth of 12ft (4m). The township has many bur trees and lebbek trees. While the township has a forestry department, it does not maintain any natural reserves. Lebbek wood is the primary building material for the town's housing stock. Wildlife in the township is almost entirely freshwater fish and prawns with few wild forest animals.

Einme Township is located in a hot tropical zone with a heavy monsoon presence. Average highs and lows range between 37°C and 20°C, respectively. Between 2016 and 2019, the average year sees 110 days of rain with an average rainfall of 99.12 inches (251.77 cm) per year.

== Demographics and Economy ==
Historical Population
Year	Einme Township	±%
2014	194,101	—
2019	211,257	+8.8%
2022	213,128	+0.9%
2023	214,162	+0.5%
Source: Ministry of Labor, Immigration, and Population and General Administration Department data

Einme Township is overwhelmingly rural, with 93.41% living outside the township's only town Einme. The predominant religion is Buddhism, adhere by 80.41% of the population, with 14.09% Christians and 4.95% Muslims. The median age is 27 and the mean household size is 4.1 people. The township's literacy rate is 89.9% and workforce participation is 85.58% for males and 38.1% for females.

The most common industry is agriculture and animal husbandry. The primary crop is rice, with the largest export market being Yangon and Yangon Region. Besides rice, black matpe and green peas are the next largest crops. Coconut and citrus fruits are the most common plantation crops. A large portion of the township also grows various vegetables, spices and bananas as subsistence crops or for the local market. Poultry is the main animal husbandry industry with both chickens and ducks being important animals. Pigs are also a common animal reared in the township. The township also has water buffalo and cows raised for farm labour and dairy, respectively.

== Transport ==
The township has good access to transportation due to proximity with cities like Myaungmya and Pathein. It has a helicopter pad within the 63rd infantry barracks located in Einme. The town relies on its many waterways for local transport. The Town of Einme is located near the intersection of major roadways, including the Pathein-Yangon highway on the eastern banks of the Einme stream. It also sits near the unopened, but complete, Pathein-Pantanaw/Yangon Railway. There are three train stations, two of which are rarely used, within the township.

== List of Village Tracts ==
The following are Einme Township's 96 village tracts in the township, which group together 510 legally recognised villages as of 2024.

- Ah Su Gyi
- Ah Su Gyi Kyaung Su
- Aing Gyi
- Boe Hlaw Yoe
- Chauk Ein Tan
- Chaung Thar Gyi
- Ga Yet Gyi
- Gon Hnyin Tan
- Hle Seik
- Hpa Yar Gyi Kone
- Htan Lay Pin
- Htan Ta Pin
- Htein Ngu
- Inn Ma
- Inn Ta Mi
- Inn Ta Mi Thet Kei
- Ka Man Ta Khun Taing
- Ka Man Taung
- Ka Nyin Kone Gyi
- Ka Nyin Kwin
- Kan Gyi Daunt
- Kan Gyi Daunt Kone
- Kan Pyo
- Kan Su Gyi Kyon Ma Yan
- Kha Lauk Thaik
- Khat Ti Ya
- Khaung Lan Kone Gyi
- Ku
- Ku Lar Kone
- Kun Chan
- Kun Sa Khan
- Kun Taing
- Kwin Gyi
- Kwin Ka Lay
- Kwin Yar Ta Khun Taing
- Kya Khat Kwayt
- Kyaik Pi
- Kyar Htaw
- Kyar Na Hpu
- Kyar Tan
- Kyaung Su
- Kyoet Kone
- Kyon Ka Ni
- Kyon Kha Yi
- Kyon La Har
- Kyon La Mu Nyaung Waing
- Kyon Sein Gyi
- Kyon Ta Loke
- Let Pan Kone
- Lu Kaung Kyun
- Ma Gyi Chaung
- Ma Yan Pin
- Me Za Li
- Me Za Li Sar Hpyu Su
- Ngu Chaung
- Ni Sat Gyi
- Nyaung Kone
- Nyaung Ngu
- Nyaung Waing Gyi
- Ohn Pin Su
- Pa Det
- Pale Chaung
- Par Ra Mi Daunt
- Pu Lu Nyaung Waing
- Pwe Sar Gon Hnyin Tan
- Pyin Ma Kone
- Pyin Ma Ngu
- Sar Hpyu Seik
- Sat Tu
- Shan Kwin
- Shan Su
- Shwe Bo Su
- Ta Kaw
- Ta Khun Taing Ah Nyar Su
- Ta Loke Kone
- Ta Man Gyi
- Tha Hpan Pin Seik
- Tha Paung
- Tha Pyay Kwin
- Tha Yet Kone
- Tha Yet Pin Kwin
- Tha Yut Gyi
- Thar Kwin
- Thea Chaung
- Thee Kwin
- Thone Se
- Tu Myaung Hle Seik
- War Kha Yei
- War Ta Loke
- Wea Gyi Wa
- Yae Ngan Kwin
- Yae Thoe
- Yar Zu Yoe
- Yone Taw
- Ywar Thit
- Za Yat Kwin
- Za Yat Seik
