= Kyungon, Wakema =

Kyungon
- Village
- Location in Burma
- Coordinates: 16°42′06″N 95°09′41″E
- Country: Burma (Myanmar)
- Region: Ayeyarwady Region
- District: Myaungmya
- Township: Wakema
- Time zone: UTC+6.30 (MST)

Kyungon is a village in Wakema Township, Myaungmya District, in the Ayeyarwady Region of northcentral Myanmar. Kyungon is on the left (south) bank of the Pyamalaw River across from the village of Kwinbauk.

In 2009 a bridge over the Pyamalaw River at Kyungon was completed. The bridge is a 500-foot suspension bridge, 14 feet wide, suitable for one-way traffic.
