= Pantanaw Township =

Pantanaw Township ပန်းတနော်မြို့နယ်
- Township
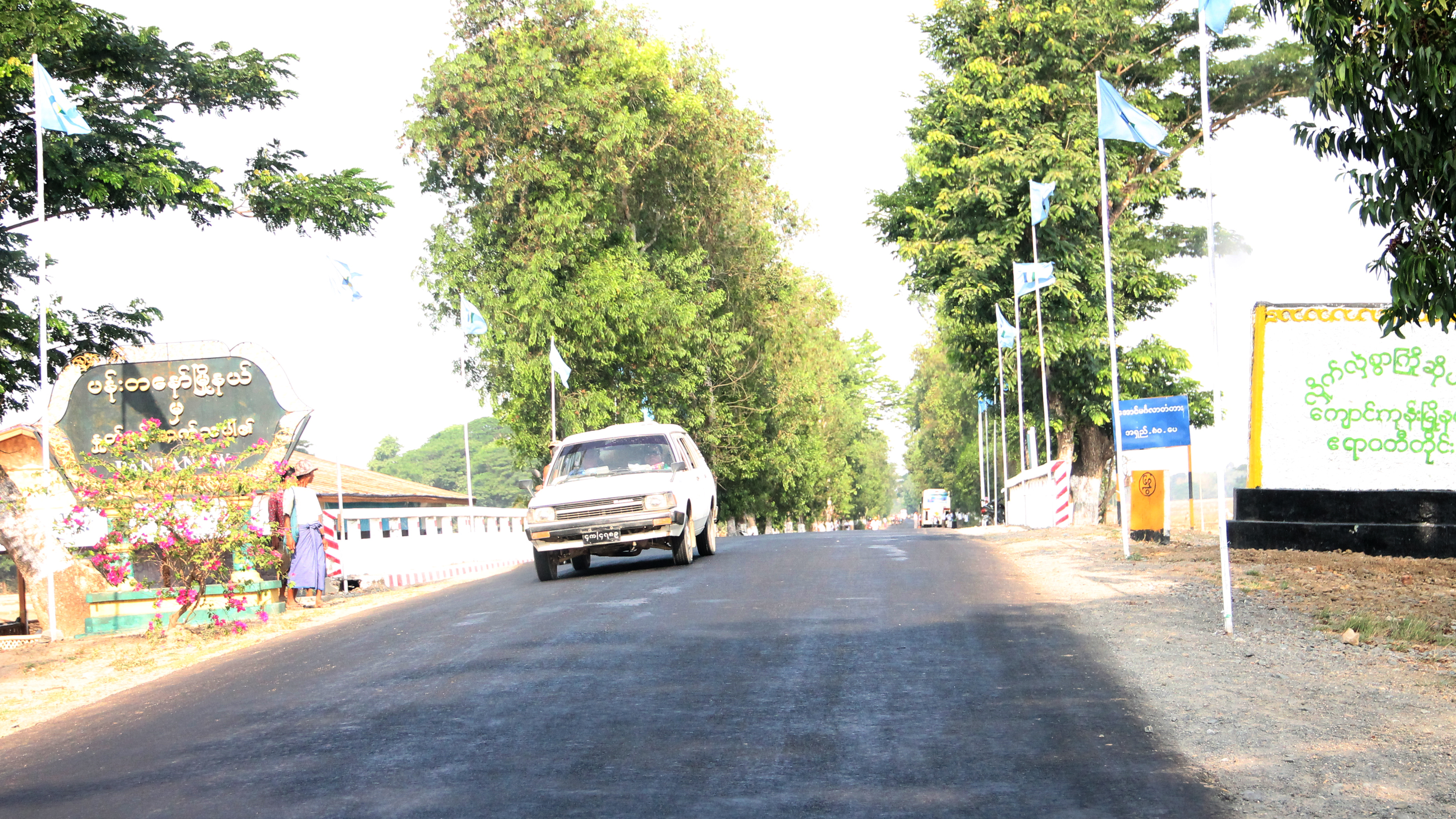
- Road entering Pantanaw township from Kyaunggon Township

- Location in Maubin district
- Coordinates: 17°02′N 95°34′E
- Country: Myanmar
- Region: Ayeyarwady Region
- District: Maubin District
- Capital: Pantanaw

Area
  - Total: 498.52 sq mi (1,291.16 km^{2})
- Elevation: 17.9 ft (5.46 m)

Population (2023)
  - Total: 279,189
  - Density: 560.036/sq mi (216.231/km^{2})
  - Ethnicities: Karen; Bamar
- Time zone: UTC+6:30 (MMT)

Pantanaw Township (Burmese: ပန်းတနော်မြို့နယ် Burmese pronunciation: [páɰ̃tənɔ̀ mjo̰nɛ̀]) is a township of Maubin District in the Ayeyarwady Region of Myanmar. The township borders Kyonpyaw and Kyaunggon townships in Pathein District to its northwest and Einme and Wakema townships of Myaungmya District to its southwest. To the northeast, the township borders Danubyu Township and to its east it borders Maubin Township and Nyaungdon Township with the Ayeyarwaddy River forming the eastern boundary of the township. There are 4 urban wards, 52 village tracts totaling 449 villages in the township. The principal town of the township is Pantanaw.

The third secretary-general of the United Nations, U Thant was a native of the city of Pantanaw and was known in Burmese naming convention as Pantanaw U Thant. The renowned modern painter Ba Nyan was also born in Pantanaw. The township is also known for its traditional murta mat production and the industry remains prevalent in many villages throughout the township.

== History ==
The town of Pantanaw possibly traces back to the Mon kingdom period as the towns' name derives from a Mon phrase meaning "Near the opening". Pantanaw Township as an administrative unit was first created in 1852 as a district within Pegu Division within Lower Burma by the British after the Second Anglo-Burmese War. Pantanaw Township was placed under the newly created Irrawaddy Division in 1881.

Pantanaw was the site of several independence events in the early 20th century. Future United Nations Secretary-General U Thant and future Prime Minister U Nu were both schoolmasters in Pantanaw and marked anniversaries of a student boycott against the Rangoon University Act in 1929. During the Second World War, U Thant was also involved with growing anti-Japanese resistance to teaching Japanese in Pantanaw high schools.

After the Burmese independence from Britain, the township became one of the sites of the Karen conflict in 1949. Advancing Karen insurgents burned down Pantanaw in 1949 after failed negotiations during their push towards the national capital, Rangoon

== Geography ==
Pantanaw Township is located in the low-lying Irrawaddy Delta in Lower Myanmar along the Ayeyarwady River with a gradual slope from and elevation of around 30 feet (9.1 m) in the north to 10 feet (3.0 m) above sea level to the south. The township is characterized by several streams and lakes formed from the low-lying deltaic landscape - many of which are not perennial. The town has very few natural, forested or wild areas. The township administration has implemented policies to reforest areas within the township with teak and other hardwood species. There are various marine species in the township, including a variety of commercial freshwater fish like the channa striata fish.

The township is prone to flooding with a warning watermark determined at 18.3 feet (5.6 m). In an average year, the township sees about 99 days of rain for an average of 81.62 inches (207.3 cm) of annual rainfall. The average highs and lows range between 30.2 °C and 22.3 °C. The area, like others in the delta, is prone to rising sea level impacts with a rise of 2.34–4.03 feet (0.71–1.23 m) predicted for the area. This level of sea level rise would exacerbate existing inundation issues and displace thousands of residents. There are villages within the township like Hse Gyi and Yone Ngu where annual flooding has fueled involuntary outmigration to nearby cities and abroad.

== Demographics ==
Historical Population
Year	Pantanaw Township	±%
2014	264,596	—
2018	275,321	+4.1%
2019	275,675	+0.1%
2022	277,564	+0.7%
2023	279,189	+0.6%
Source: Ministry of Labor, Immigration, and Population and General Administration Department data

Pantanaw Township is mostly rural with 92.5% of the population in 2019 living outside of urban areas. The mean household size is 4.3 and there are 94 males for every 100 females within the township. School attendance rates for children in the township over the age of 11 are lower than the national average. The majority religion is Buddhism, practiced by about 85.0% of the population with the second largest religious group being Christians at 10.6% of the population. Pantanaw township is one of the few townships in the Bamar-majority regions of Myanmar that is not Bamar majority itself. Instead, Karen people comprise 50.72% of the township's population.

== Economy ==
The economy of Pantanaw Township is primarily agriculture, with its location along road and waterway infrastructure allowing it to export rice and various legumes, to Yangon Region. While Rice is the primary crop, black matpe beans and peanuts are the primary off-season crops. 87.4% of the arable land in the township is used for farming with most of the remainder used for grazing. The townships's agricultural sector is largely unmechanized with only 9 combine harvesters. The most prolific heavy machinery are the town's over 3000 motorized water pumps, all owned by individual farms. The township has 10 different dams to control flooding with four large earthen dams on the Ayeyarwady and Pantanaw Rivers.

The history of land confiscations in the township, combined with the almost entirely agrarian economy of the township has created poor socioeconomic conditions where many farmers end up in circles of depths and loans. Without a sense of power over their own livelihoods, many seek to use strategies of diversification, migration and dependency to get out of the negative circle of debt.

== List of Village Tracts ==
The following are Pantanaw Township's 52 village tracts in the township, which group together 452 legally recognised villages as of 2024.

- Ba Waing
- Chaung Ka Lay
- Da Naw
- Daw War
- Hpa Yar Chaung
- Htein Ku Lar Kone
- Inn Ma
- Inn Ta Kaw
- Ka Nyin Kone
- Ka Nyin Ngu
- Ka Paing
- Ka Tauk Sat
- Ka Zin Ngu
- Kat Tha Win
- Kha Nwet Ka Bo
- Kha Yae Gan
- Khat Ti Ya (Upper)
- Kyon Lan
- Kyon Taing Gyi
- Kyon Taing Ka Lay
- Kyon Tone Gyi
- Kyon Tone Ka Lay
- Let Pan Kone
- Ma Yan
- Mein Ma Pyay
- Min Ga Yu
- Min Se
- Moe Goke
- Myay Nu
- Myit Wa
- Oe Bo
- Pa Thwei
- Pay Pin Myauk
- Pay Pin Taung
- Pya Lin
- Sagaing
- Sat Thay
- Shwe Hlay
- Shwe Kyaung Myauk
- Sin Lan Gyi
- Su Taung Pyayt
- Taw Kyaung
- Tha Yet Ngu
- Thone Gwa
- Tu Chaung
- Wea Daunt
- Yae Le Hne Kaw
- Yae Paw Gyi
- Yae Paw Yae Le
- Yin Yo
- Yone Taw
- Za Yat Hla Gyi
