= Technological University, Maubin =

University in Maubin Township, Myanmar

Technological University (Maubin)
- နည်းပညာတက္ကသိုလ် (မအူပင်)
- Former names: Government Technical Institute; Government Technological College
- Motto: Never Stop Teaching. Never Stop Learning. Never Stop Thinking.
- Type: Public
- Established: 2007; 19 years ago
- Affiliations: Ministry of Education
- Rector: Dr. Kyawt Khin
- Location: Maubin, Ayeyarwady Region, Myanmar; 16.7326471°N 95.6073856°E

Technological University (Maubin) (Burmese: နည်းပညာတက္ကသိုလ် (မအူပင်)) is situated near Aung Heit village, Maubin Township, in Ayeyawady Region of Myanmar. It was established as Government Technical Institute (Maubin) on 3 November 1989. It was upgraded to Government Technological College on 31 May 2002, and to the university level on 20 January 2007.

== Structural building ==
The campus has a three-storey main building that measures 278 feet (85 m) long, 140 feet (43 m) wide, and 52.5 feet (16.0 m) tall. Additionally, there are five two-storey buildings that measure 165 feet (50 m) long, 50 feet (15 m) wide, and 37 feet (11 m) tall. There are 33 classrooms, the principal's office three management rooms, two stuff rooms, one convocation room, two practical science rooms, one language-lab room and three drawing rooms. There are three one-storey workshops that measure 140 by 60 by 24.5 feet (42.7 m × 18.3 m × 7.5 m). There are ten unit one storey, brick nogging six unit one storey RC and two of six unit two of two storey RC.

== Departments ==
Maubin TU is organized as follows:

- 4 engineering departments
- 5 academic departments

=== Engineering departments ===
Maubin TU's engineering departments are as follows:

- Department of Civil Engineering
- Department of Mechanical Engineering
- Department of Electrical Power Engineering
- Department of Electronic Engineering

=== Academic departments ===
The academic departments are:

- Department of Myanmar
- Department of Engineering Chemistry
- Department of English
- Department of Engineering Mathematics
- Department of Engineering Physics

== Programs ==
- Bachelor of Engineering (B.E)

== Degree offer ==
Program	Degree	Year
Bachelor of Civil Engineering	B.E. (Civil)	6 years
Bachelor of Electronic and Communication Engineering	B.E. (EC)	6 years
Bachelor of Electrical Power Engineering	B.E. (EP)	6 years
Bachelor of Mechanical Engineering	B.E. (ME)	6 years

== See also ==
- Technological University, Thanlyin
- West Yangon Technological University
- Mandalay Technological University
