= Nyaungdon Township =

Nyaungdon Township ညောင်တုန်းမြို့နယ်
- Township
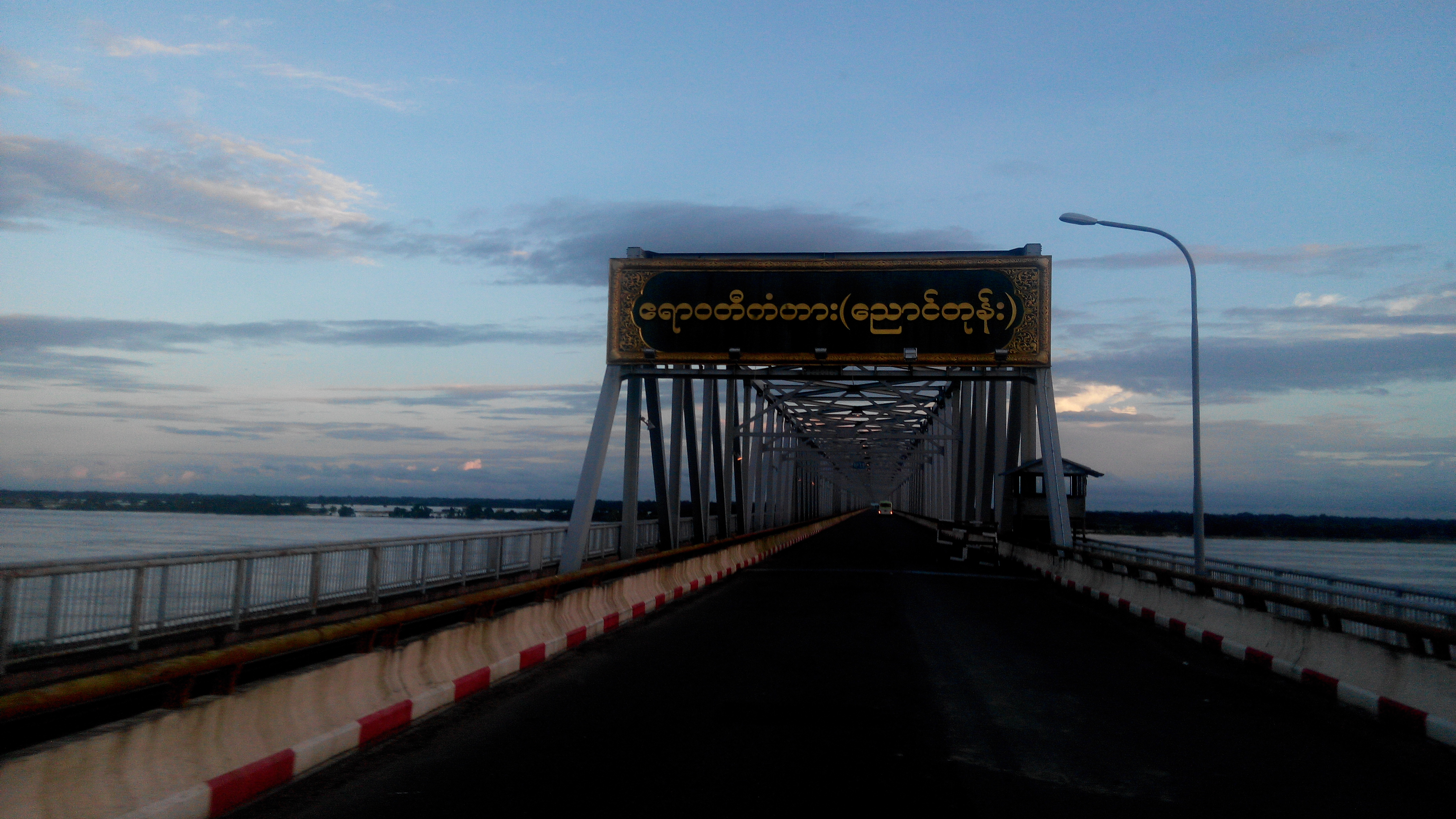
- Ayeyarwady Bridge in Nyaundon Township

- Location in Maubin district
- Coordinates: 17.0375°N 95.6389°E
- Country: Myanmar
- Region: Ayeyarwady Region
- District: Maubin District
- Capital: Nyaungdon

Area
  - Total: 348.23 sq mi (901.9 km^{2})
- Elevation: 20 ft (6.1 m)

Population (2023)
  - Total: 231,327
  - Density: 664.29/sq mi (256.49/km^{2})
  - Ethnicities: Bamar; Karen
  - Religions: Buddhism
- Time zone: UTC+6:30 (MMT)

Nyaungdon Township (Burmese: ညောင်တုန်းမြို့နယ် [ɲàʊɰ̃dóʊɰ̃ mjo̰nɛ̀]), also spelt Nyaung Tone Township and formerly Yandoon, is a township of Maubin District in the eastern Ayeyarwady Region, Myanmar.

Nyaungdon Township is bordered to the west by the rest of Maubin District and to its east by Yangon Region, bordering Taikkyi, Htantabin and Twante townships. To its north, it borders Danubyu Township, to its west by Pantanaw Township and to its south by Maubin Township. The township consists of 1 town divided into 10 wards and 308 villages grouped into 44 village tracts.

== History ==
The name Nyaungdon is thought have meant "boat dock" in the Mon language. A village by the name of Nyaungdon existed at the difluence of the Irrawaddy River and its distributary the Pan Hlaing River. The village was elevated to town status in 1884 by the British colonial government.

== Geography ==
Nyaungdon Township is located in the Irrawaddy Delta and has a large number of streams, creeks and rivers. The Township sits mostly east of the Irrawaddy River and straddles the Pan Hlaing. The eastern boundary of the township follows the Bawle River.

The township's climate experiences heavy rainfall that can cause long-duration floodplain flooding. Large portions of the township, including major roads, are exposed to flood risk . The southwestern part of the township and the urban area around Nyaungdon town sees less risk being protected by river embankments. Between 2016 and 2019, the average year saw 85.67 inches (217.6 cm) of rain over 104.5 days of rainfall and the average highs and lows were 37.25 °C (99.05 °F) and 16.67 °C (62.01 °F) respectively.

The township has a variety of flora and fauna. The township's deltaic soil is prime for hardwood trees including lebbeck, Queen Crepe Myrtles, Bombax and karoi trees. The local government does not recognize any wild fauna in the township. However, the township has several wetlands with several bird species. In the wetlands near Natse village, 23 wetland indicator species were recorded including the vulnerable Sarus Crane and Jerdon's Babbler.

== Demographics ==
Historical population
| Year | Nyaungdon Township | ±% |
|---|---|---|
| 2014 | 215,906 | — |
| 2018 | 199,207 | −7.7% |
| 2019 | 199,227 | +0.0% |
| 2022 | 231,207 | +16.1% |
| 2023 | 231,327 | +0.1% |

The 2014 Myanmar Census reported that Nyaungdon Township had a population of 215,966 which dropped below the 200,000 mark by 2018 according to the General Administration Department. In 2014, the median age was 27.6 years and the average household had 4.1 people. By 2022, the township had grown back to 231,207 people.

The township is mostly rural with 88.7% of the population living outside Nyaungdon town in 2019. The township is also overwhelming Buddhist with 96.5% adhering to it. The second largest religion at 2.3% is Christianity. The township's racial makeup is 57.8% Bamar and 42.2% Karen.<name="mimu"/> The Karen people in Nyaungdon host a white cotton festival during the Wagaung full moon feast where traditional dances and frog drums are played.

== Economy and Transport ==
The primary industry of the township is agriculture with the township's strong transportation connections facilitating strong economic growth. Rice is, by far, its largest product with black matpe and maize. The township also has a sizeable coconut, banana and betel nut plantation sector and a significant poultry industry. Its proximity to Yangon via the Yangon-Pathein highway has also seen a proliferation of Mechanised agriculture.

The Yangon-Pathein highway crosses the Irrawaddy River in Nyaungdon Township over the Bo Myat Tun Bridge, a 1.74 miles (2.80 km) bridge completed in 1999. At the time it was the longest bridge in Myanmar and greatly reduced travel time and transport costs. However, the skewness of the bridge relative to the natural flow of the river caused severe erosion that became noticeable by 2017 despite erosion protection measures.

In November 2011, the Ayeyarwady Bridge at Nyaungdon was completed. The bridge is a 7,402 foot (2,256 m) long rail-cum-road bridge with a 28 foot (8.5 m) wide two-lane motorway and 14 foot (4.3 m) wide railroad flanked by two pedestrian walks which are 3 feet 3 inches (0.99 m) wide each. Two approach roads on both sides are 3,412 feet (1,040 m) long and two railroads are 13,143 feet (4,006 m) long. Its water clearance area is 262 feet (80 m) wide and 75 feet (23 m) high. It can withstand a load of 75 tons. The new bridge is situated only 1.37 miles (2.20 km) upstream from the Bo Myat Tun Bridge due to concerns with erosion. The bridge's new location was chosen at a crossing where the river's flow was most stable over a 20-year study period.

== Notable people ==
- Than Than Htwe, footballer for Myanmar women's national football team
- Shwe Done Bi Aung, film director
- Ba Gyan, visual artist and cartoonist

== List of Village Tracts ==
The following are Nyaungdon Township's 44 village tracts in the township, which group together 314 recognised villages as of 2024.

- Ah Lel Chaung
- Ah Ywea
- Auk Se
- Byaw Tha Lan
- Chaung Gyi
- Gan Chaung
- Gon Min Seik
- Hnget Pyaw Kyun
- Hpa Yar Kone
- Hteik Wa Gyi
- Inn Ma
- Ka Nyin Kauk Gyi
- Ka Toke Ka Ma
- Koke Ko Wa
- Kun Thee Pin
- Kyaung Su
- Kyein Chaung
- Kyon Ta Mar
- Kyon Yit
- Kyun U
- Me Za Li Da La
- Me Za Li Ywar Haung
- Moe Hoke
- Myanmar Pyar Thar
- Nat Pay
- Nyaung
- Nyaung Waing
- Par Hleit (Upper)
- Pay Si Kyun
- Sar Ma Lauk
- Set Kawt Taung
- Set Kawt Yae Lel Kyun
- Sin Tone
- Sun Ta Nee
- Ta Zin Yae Kyaw
- Tha Pyay Chaung
- Tha Pyu Yae Lel Kyun
- Than Kyoe
- Tu Chaung
- War Taw Sun
- Wea Daunt-Ah Twin
- Yan Kin San Yar
- Ywar Thit
- Zee Hpyu Kyun
