= List of seminaries and theological colleges in Myanmar =

This is a list of seminaries and theological colleges in Myanmar. As of 2025, the Association for Theological Education in Myanmar (ATEM) has 34 member colleges.

A

- Advancing Christ Theological Seminary
- Advanced Institute of Mission
- All Nations Theological Seminary
- Antioch Christian Bible College
- Apostolic Christian Bible College

B

- Believers Church Biblical Seminary (N/Dagon) (Formerly known as GFABC)
- Beulah Theological Seminary
- Bethel Baptist Bible Institute
- Bethany Theological Seminary
- Biblical School of Theology

C

- Chin Christian College
- Chin Christian Institute of Theology
- Canaan Theological College
- Christian International School of Theology
- Christian Theological College
- Church Planting Training School
- Cornerstone Bible College

D

- Dagon Bible Institute
- Dawn Mission Training Centre
- Disciple Bible College
- Doulous Theological Seminary

E

- Eastern Bible Institute
- Evangelical Baptist Bible School
- Evangelical Bible College
- Evangelical Bible Seminary
- Evangelical Christian Bible School, Yangon
- Evangelical Reformed Seminary

F

- Faith Baptist Bible College & Theological Seminary (Myanmar)
- Faith Bible Training Centre
- Far Eastern Fundamental School of Theology
- Free Gospel Outreach Bible College

G

- Gospel Baptist Bible Seminary
- Grace Baptist Theological Seminary
- Grace Bible Seminary
- Grace Biblical School of Theology
- Grace School of Mission
- Grace Theological College

H

- Hakha Gospel Baptist Bible Seminary
- Hermon Biblical School of Theology
- Holy Cross Theological College
- Holiness Theological Seminary
- House of Praise Bible Institute

I

- Immanuel Bible College, Pyin Oo Lwin
- Institute of Mission & Church Planting

K

- Kalay Christian College
- Kalay Gospel Baptist Bible College
- Karen Baptist Theological Seminary

L

- Life Theological College
- Life Theological College
- Lisu Theological Seminary of Myanmar
- Living Centre Theological Seminary
- Lorrain Theological College

M

- MaMe Bible Academy (Kalay)
- McNeilus Maranatha Christian College - MMCC
- Myanmar Christian Preachers Training College, Yangon (Rangoon)
- Myanmar Institute of Theology
- Myanmar Institute of Christian Theology
- Methodist Institute of Theology
- Minister's Training College
- Missionary Bible Institute
- Missionary Training School
- Mt. Zion Bible Institute Correspondent
- Myanmar Bible Seminary
- Myanmar Biblical Christian Institute
- Myanmar Centre for Theological Studies
- Myanmar Evangelical Graduate School of Theology
- Myanmar Evangelical Mission Bible College
- Myanmar Evangelical Theological Seminary
- Myanmar Global Centre Theological Seminary
- Myanmar Reformed Presbyterian School of Theology
- Myanmar School of Bible & Mission Canna Garden
- Myanmar School of Theology & Mission
- Myanmar Theological College, Mandalay
- Myanmar Theological College
- Myanmar Union Adventist Seminary
- Myanmar Vision Christian College
- Myitkyina Christian Seminary

N

- Northern Shan State Union Christian College

P

- Paku Divinity School
- Pacific Rim Bible College
- Pwo Karen Theological Seminary
- Paniel Bible College
- Puato Baptist Bible College (PBBC)

R

- Reaching The World Bible College
- Reformed Bible Institute
- Reformed Theological College
- Reformed Theological Seminary
- Restoration Bible Institute

S

- School of Gospel Ministry
- South East Asia Bible College
- South East Asia Mission College, Yangon
- South -East Asia Nazarene Bible College

T

- Tahan Institute of Theology
- Tahan Theological College
- Tedim Christian College
- The Wholistic
- The Word College
- Trinity College

U

- Union Theological College
- Union Bible Seminary

V

- Victorious Bible Institute

Y

- Yangon Adventist Seminary
- Yangon Bible Institute
- Yangon Bible Seminary
- Yangon Graduate School of Theology
- Yangon Gospel Baptist Bible College
- Yangon Theological Seminary
- Yangon Vision Christian College

Z
