= Western Pwo language =

Karen language of Myanmar

Western Pwo
- ဖျိၩ့, ဖျိၩ့ၡိ
- Pronunciation: [pʰlóuɴ ɕô]
- Native to: Myanmar
- Region: Irrawaddy Delta
- Ethnicity: Karen
- Native speakers: (undated figure of 210,000)
- Language family: Sino-Tibetan: (Tibeto-Burman); Karenic; Pwo; Western Pwo
- Writing system: Mon–Burmese (Western Pwo alphabet)

Official status
- Recognised minority language in: Myanmar

Language codes
- ISO 639-3: pwo
- Glottolog: pwow1235

Western Pwo, or Delta Pwo, is a Karen language of Burma with 210,000 estimated speakers. It is not intelligible with other varieties of Pwo. There is little dialectal variation.

== Distribution ==
- Ayeyarwady Region: Einme, Maubin, Pathein, Kyonpyaw, and Hinthada towns
- Yangon Region: Twante township

== Phonology ==
=== Consonants ===
The consonants of Western Pwo are as follows:

Consonant phonemes
		Bilabial	Dental	Alveolar	Alveolo- palatal	Palatal	Labial- velar	Velar	Glottal
Plosive	voiced	b		d				ɡ	
Plosive	voiceless	p		t	tɕ			k	ʔ
Plosive	aspirated	pʰ		tʰ				kʰ	
Plosive	implosive	ɓ		ɗ					
Nasal		m		n		ɲ		ŋ	
Fricative	voiced		ð ([d̪~d̪ð])	z					
Fricative	voiceless		θ ([t̪~t̪θ])	s	ɕ				
Fricative	aspirated			sʰ					
Approximant	central			r ([r~ɹ])		j ([j~ʝ])	w		
Approximant	lateral			l					

=== Vowels ===
Open rhymes

There are 12 open rhymes:

	Monophthongs				Diphthongs	
	Front	Central	Back		Front offglide	Back offglide
			Unrounded	Rounded		
Close	i	ɨ	ɯ	u		
Close-mid	e [e̞]	ə		o		
Open-mid	ɛ	ə		ɔ		
Open		a			ai [äi]	au [äʊ~äo]

Nasalized rhymes

There are 8 nasalized rhymes:

Monophthongs		Diphthongs		
(iɴ)				
	əɴ	eiɴ	əɯɴ	ouɴ
	aɴ	aiɴ		auɴ

- /-iɴ/ in parentheses because it appears only in loanwords from Burmese and those from other languages that have entered via Burmese.

These rhymes are realized as follows:

- /iɴ/ [ɪɴ~ɪ̃]
- /-əɴ/ [ə̃~ə]
- /-aɴ/ [ɐɴ~ɐ̃]
- /-eiɴ/ [eiɴ~eĩ]
- /-əɯɴ/ [əɯɴ~əɯ̃]
- /-ouɴ/ [ouɴ~oũ]
- /-aiɴ/ [äiɴ~äĩ]
- /-auɴ/ [äʊɴ~äʊ̃]

The nasalization of /-əɴ/ is very weak and may be completely eliminated. In that case, /-əɴ/ loses its phonetic distinction from /-ə/. Therefore, in some speakers, /-əɴ/ has merged into /-ə/. The nasalization of /-eiɴ/, /-əɯɴ/, /-ouɴ/, /-aiɴ/, and /-auɴ/ is also often weak. As a result, the distinction between /-ai/ and /-aiɴ/ and that between /-au/ and /-auɴ/ may be ambiguous for some speakers. The occurrence of /-əɯɴ/ is very rare.

Stopped rhymes

There are 8 stopped rhymes:

Monophthongs			Diphthongs		
	ɨʔ		eiʔ	əɯʔ	ouʔ
eʔ		oʔ			
	aʔ	ɔʔ			

These rhymes appear when there is a glottal stop at the end of the syllable. The final glottal stop may be an inherent feature of the checked tone rather than a syllable-final consonant.

These rhymes are realized as follows:

- /-ɨʔ/ [ɨʔ]
- /-eʔ/ [eʔ]
- /-oʔ/ [oʔ]
- /-aʔ/ [äʔ]
- /-ɔʔ/ [ɔʔ]
- /-eiʔ/ [eiʔ]
- /-əɯʔ/ [əɯʔ]
- /-ouʔ/ [ouʔ]

=== Tones ===
Western Pwo is a tonal language, which means phonemic contrasts can be made on the basis of the tone of a vowel. In Western Pwo, these contrasts involve not only pitch, but also phonation, intensity (loudness), duration, and vowel quality.

There are four tones: low-level, high-level, falling, and checked tones. In the table, they are shown with /a/ with tone marks. The exact phonetic realization of /a/ is [ä]. Additionally, there are atonic syllables, and they are represented by not adding any tone marks. The only rhyme that can appear in atonic syllables is /-ə/. These are pronounced short and weak.

Tone	Phonemic	Phonetic	Example	Gloss
Low-level	/à/	[a11]	မၫ /mà/	'wife'
High-level	/á/	[a55]	မၩကၩ /má ká/	'to work'
Falling	/â/	[a51]	မါ /mâ/	'debt'
Checked	/aʔ/	[aʔ51]	မၬ /maʔ/	'son-in-law'
Atonic	/ə/		မ /mə/	colloquial for မွဲ 'to be true/to be indeed'

In syllables ending with /ɴ/, the checked tone is excluded:

- Low-level ခၪ့ /kʰàɴ/ "foot/leg of any kind"
- High-level ခၩ့ /kʰáɴ/ "spider"
- Falling ခး /kʰâɴ/ "country"

The pitch of the checked tone is almost the same as that of the falling tone. Therefore, some speakers confuse the checked tone with a falling tone. Giving a phonological interpretation of the checked tone is not a simple task. The following two possibilities must be considered: (1) it is a distinct tone from the other tones, with a final glottal stop as its inherent feature; and (2) it is a falling tone that appears in the syllable ending with a glottal stop. If we adopt interpretation (1), there is no need to phonologically recognize syllables ending with a glottal stop, because the final glottal stop is a feature of the tone. If we adopt interpretation (2), we need to phonologically recognize syllables ending with a glottal stop. Kato (1995) adopted interpretation (2) because the pitch of the checked tone is almost the same as that of the falling tone. However, the possibility of interpretation (1) remains. Therefore, adopting an interpretation that combines (1) and (2); that is, the final glottal stop is an inherent feature of the checked tone, and at the same time, it is also regarded as a phonological syllable-final consonant.

=== Syllable structure ===
The syllable structure of Western Pwo can be represented as C1(C2)V1(V2)(C3)/(T). “C” stands for a consonant, “V” for a vowel, and “T” for a tone. C1 is an initial consonant, C2 is a medial consonant, and C3 is a final consonant. One or two vowels may occur and are represented by V1 and V2. Bracketed elements may or may not occur. The part of C1(C2)- is called an onset, and that of -V1(V2)(C3) is called a rhyme.

The phonemes that can appear as C2 are /-w-/ [w], /-l-/ [l], /-r-/ [r~ɹ], and /-j-/ [j~ʝ]. The combinations of C1 and C2 that have been found to date are listed as follows:

		C1																
		p	θ	t	k	ʔ	pʰ	tʰ	kʰ	ɓ	ɗ	s	sʰ	x	m	n	j	l
C2	w	+	+	+	+	+		+	+	+	+	+	+	+	+	+	+	+
C2	l	+		+	+		+	+	+	+					+			
C2	r	+			+				+									
C2	j	+					+			+								

The structure of a rhyme can be represented as -V1(V2) (C3). Among the components of a rhyme, the position of C3 can only be occupied by /-ɴ/ or /-ʔ/. The nasal /-ɴ/ is a phoneme that can only occur as a final consonant. It is realized as [ɴ] or nasalization of the preceding vowel. Rhymes can be divided into three types: open rhymes without C3, nasalized rhymes with /-ɴ/, and stopped rhymes with /-ʔ/.

== Example text ==
Article 1 of the Universal Declaration of Human Rights in Western Pwo:

ၦကိၭဂၩ ဂဲၫထဲၩ့လၩ့ဖျဲၪလၧ ဆၧပျီၩဖျ့ၭမီၪ့ဎီၩ့ အဆၧလၩဆၧဖၩ့အဖၧၩ့မွဲဂ့ၩ, ဆၧပျီၩဖျ့ၭမီၪ့ဎီၩ့ အခွံးအရ့ၩဖၧၩ့မွဲဂ့ၩနီၪလီၫ. ၦၥံၪလဖၪကြၨၭအီၪလၧ ဆၧၥ့ၪယၪနၪၥ့ၪ လၧအအၪ့နၩ့ဘဲၩ့ဖၭဆၧဒဲ ၥၭလၧအၥ့ၪယၫတခ့ၭဖဝၭတၭ, ၦၥံၪလဖၪ ကြၨၭဖံၭထံၩဖံၭၥိၭလၧ ဆၧအဲၪဆၧကွံၩအဖၧၩ့နီၪလီၫ.

Article 1 of the Universal Declaration of Human Rights in Burmese:

လူတိုင်းသည် တူညီလွတ်လပ်သော ဂုဏ်သိက္ခာဖြင့် လည်းကောင်း၊ တူညီလွတ်လပ်သော အခွင့်အရေးများဖြင့် လည်းကောင်း၊ မွေးဖွားလာသူများ ဖြစ်သည်။ ထိုသူတို့၌ ပိုင်းခြား ဝေဖန်တတ်သော ဉာဏ်နှင့် ကျင့်ဝတ်သိတတ်သော စိတ်တို့ရှိကြ၍ ထိုသူတို့သည် အချင်းချင်း မေတ္တာထား၍ ဆက်ဆံကျင့်သုံးသင့်၏။

Article 1 of the Universal Declaration of Human Rights in English:

All human beings are born free and equal in dignity and rights. They are endowed with reason and conscience and should act towards one another in a spirit of brotherhood.
