= Myanmar Union Adventist Seminary =

Private Christian college in Myaungmya

Coordinates: 16°35′11.0″N 94°54′10.2″E

- Myanmar Union Damma Tekkatho
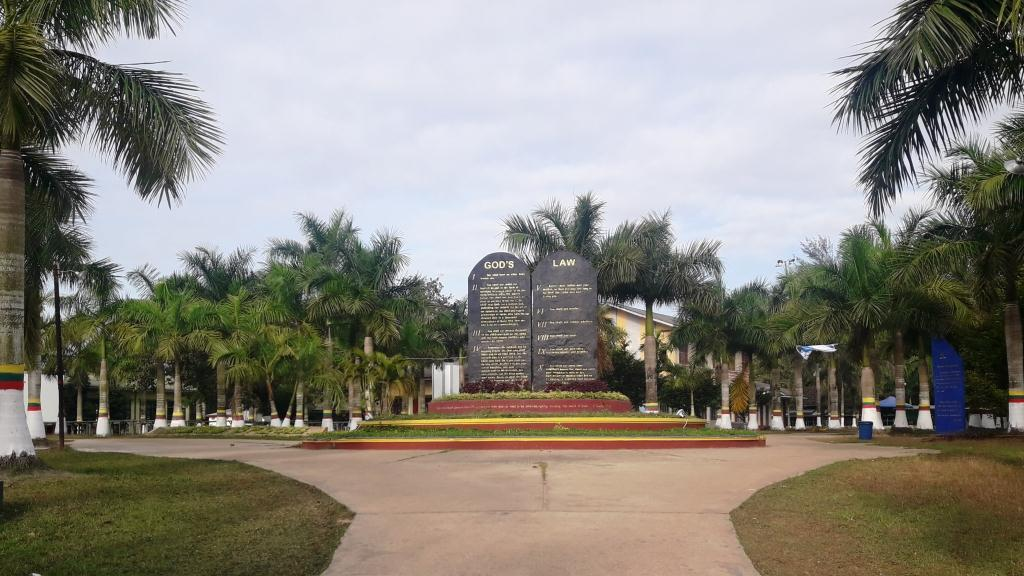
- Other name: MUAS
- Former name: Union Bible Seminary
- Type: Private
- Established: 1960; 66 years ago
- Religious affiliation: Seventh-day Adventist Church
- Academic affiliations: Adventist Accrediting Association
- Chairman: Timothy Muna Paul
- President: Paul Tanbaunaw
- Vice-president: Sah Mu Paw (VPAA), Solomon Soe (VPFA), Lay Moo Kyaw (VPSA), Tin Lay (VPHR/PR),
- Dean: Sah Mu Paw
- Students: approx. 500
- Location: Myaungmya District, Ayeyarwady Region (main campus), Myanmar
- Website: muas.edu.mm

Myanmar Union Adventist Seminary (MUAS), formerly known as Burma Union Bible Seminary, is a private Seventh-day Adventist college located in Myaungmya. Founded in 1960, it is a part of the Seventh-day Adventist Church education system and the only tertiary Seventh-day education institution serving the Myanmar Union mission.

The 56 acres (2,400,000 sq ft) property is located on Mosokwin Road, approximately 220 km (140 mi) west of Yangon. It has been accredited by the Adventist Accrediting Association in Maryland since 1998.

== History ==
Myanmar Union Adventist Seminary started as a small Seventh-day elementary school in 1938. In 1960, under the direction of Elder W. W. Christensen, 15 denominational workers, mostly high school students, enrolled for a two-year training course. They were the first batch of graduates from the school in 1962.

During the 1970s, the school experienced steady growth, offering courses for high school students from across Myanmar. In 1974, the school offered its first three-year curriculum, a ministerial training course for high-school graduates, and a two-year curriculum in Bible instruction. The first graduates from these programs received their diplomas in 1977.

=== Myanmar Union Adventist Seminary ===
In 1991, MUAS introduced a four-year curriculum for Bachelor of Arts in Religion with the approval of the Board of Seminary. In addition, the Seminary was authorized to offer two-year program for Certificate in Teaching Ministry in 1991. In 1996, the College Board approved additional expansion of industrial arts, business, and education departments and termination of plus-two program with the intent to offer pure collegiate major courses. Thus the college offered courses for Bachelor of Arts in religion, Bachelor of Arts in education, Bachelor of Business Administration, and Bachelor of Applied Arts in industry and minor in office administration. In 1998, the college added another minor course of Home Science and English. In 1999, Bachelor of Applied Arts in industry was reduced to a minor and Health Education minor was offered. In 2001, it was felt by the majority members of the College Board that the G 12 program in Secondary Academy is essential in our education program to meet the standard of present educational system of Adventist Education. Therefore, Myanmar Union Adventist Seminary must provide for G 12 program and for a four-year degree program. This means that a student receives a bachelor's degree after a minimum of seventeen [11+2+4] years of schooling.(This program commenced with the 2001 – 2002 school year.

== Demonym ==
The demonym "MUAS' has been used for many years by MUAS faculty, staff and alumni. Students frequently use it when they are off-campus, and it is more official than informal.

== Mission statement ==
The Myanmar Union Adventist Seminary is an Adventist institution of higher learning in Myanmar which is committed to preparing young people for the service of God and man through quality Christian education.

== Academics ==
=== Undergraduate School ===
- Bachelor of Arts in Religion
- Bachelor of Theology
- Bachelor of Arts in Education, majors in
  - General Education
  - Elementary Education
- Bachelor of Arts in Business Administration, majors in
  - Accounting
  - Management

== Publications ==
MUAS publishes weekly newsletter called "Flashpoint".

== See also ==
- List of Seventh-day Adventist colleges and universities
- Seventh-day Adventist education
- List of seminaries and theological colleges in Myanmar
