= Ma-ubin =

Maubin မအူပင်
- Town
- Location in Myanmar
- Coordinates: 16°43′48″N 95°39′0″E
- Country: Myanmar
- Region: Ayeyarwady Region
- District: Maubin District
- Township: Maubin Township

Population (2023)
  - Total: 42,439
- Time zone: UTC+6:30 (MMT)

Maubin (Burmese: မအူပင် [məʔùbɪ̀ɰ̃ mjo̰]) is a town in the Ayeyarwady Division of south-west Myanmar. It is the seat of the Maubin Township in the Maubin District. The population as of 2021 was 51,542. The inhabitants of the town, as well as the district are mainly Bamar and Karen.

During Cyclone Nargis which devastated the Irrawaddy Delta, the Burmese military offered convoys to refugees to Ma-ubin to escape the devastation in the worst-hit areas.

== Geography and economy ==
Rice growing and fishing are the major contributors to the economy. It is a developing town with growing transportation and communication services.

The town is linked with Yangon, 40 miles (65 km) east, by the Twante Canal which heads east. The canal opened in 1932 and improved the transporting of goods back and forth from the former capital, then known as Rangoon.

The town was hit by an earthquake in 2023, killing 3 people including 2 nuns. The M_{w} 4.8 earthquake had an epicenter near the city in Nyaungdon Township.

== Landmarks ==
=== Pagodas ===
The predominant religion in the area is Theravada Buddhism and there are many pagodas within Maubin township:

Sein Mya Kantha Zeti pagoda is located on the Sane Mya Kanthar Street just north of the town.

Paw Taw Mu Pagoda (formally Myo Oo Paw Taw Mu Ceti) is an ancient pagoda situated in the southern part of the town on the Toe River. The old pagoda fell in 2002 following river erosion of the bank but it was rebuilt on 22 May 2005 under government guidance.

Shwe Phone Myint Ceti is located in the Pagoda Street in the 2nd quarter of the town. The foundation stone of the Ceti was laid in 1890. Other notable pagodas include the Akyawsulyanmyattonetan pagoda.

In 2023, an earthquake damaged the Shwe Phone Myint Ceti.

=== Bridges ===
There are four bridges in Maubin district, including Maubin Bridge, Khattiya Bridge, Pantanaw Bridge and Bo Myat Htun Bridge. Maubin Bridge is a reinforced concrete bridge with a capacity of 60 tons. It is located in Maubin Township and the foundation stone was laid on 4 April 1994. The bridge formally opened on 10 February 1998.

== Climate ==
Climate data for Maubin (1991–2020)
Month	Jan	Feb	Mar	Apr	May	Jun	Jul	Aug	Sep	Oct	Nov	Dec	Year
Mean daily maximum °C (°F)	31.0 (87.8)	33.4 (92.1)	35.4 (95.7)	36.9 (98.4)	34.2 (93.6)	31.0 (87.8)	30.3 (86.5)	30.1 (86.2)	31.1 (88.0)	32.2 (90.0)	32.1 (89.8)	30.6 (87.1)	32.3 (90.1)
Daily mean °C (°F)	23.2 (73.8)	25.0 (77.0)	27.4 (81.3)	29.5 (85.1)	28.9 (84.0)	27.4 (81.3)	26.9 (80.4)	26.7 (80.1)	27.2 (81.0)	27.6 (81.7)	26.6 (79.9)	24.1 (75.4)	26.7 (80.1)
Mean daily minimum °C (°F)	15.4 (59.7)	16.6 (61.9)	19.4 (66.9)	22.1 (71.8)	23.5 (74.3)	23.7 (74.7)	23.6 (74.5)	23.4 (74.1)	23.3 (73.9)	23.0 (73.4)	21.0 (69.8)	17.6 (63.7)	21.1 (70.0)
Average precipitation mm (inches)	6.5 (0.26)	5.4 (0.21)	10.1 (0.40)	30.2 (1.19)	280.1 (11.03)	492.7 (19.40)	574.6 (22.62)	535.8 (21.09)	359.4 (14.15)	201.1 (7.92)	40.6 (1.60)	8.0 (0.31)	2,544.5 (100.18)
Average precipitation days (≥ 1.0 mm)	0.4	0.2	0.8	1.8	13.9	24.7	25.8	26.0	21.1	12.6	3.2	0.4	130.9
Source: World Meteorological Organization

== Education ==
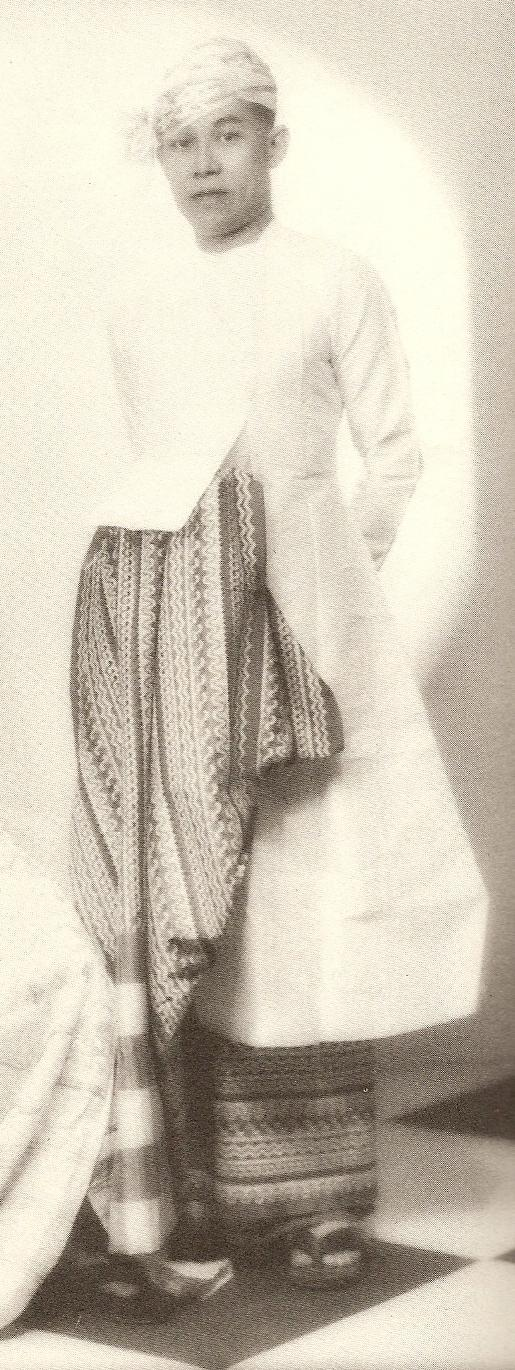
Ba Maw (1893 - 1977)

The town has several universities including University of Computer Studies (Maubin), Technological University, Maubin and Ma-ubin University. University of Computer Studies (Maubin) offers degrees in Bachelor of Computer Science, Bachelor of Computer Technology and post-graduate degrees of Bachelor of Computer Science, Bachelor of Computer Technology, Master of Computer Science, Master of Computer Technology, Master of Information Science and a Diploma in Computer Science.

Ma-ubin University opened in July 2003.

Dhamma Manorama - meaning ‘Delightful Environment of Dhamma’, is situated a mile away on the main road to Maubin University. It offers 10-day courses in learning and as of May 2005, eight courses had been held in which 349 students participated. Many of the students come from Maubin's No. 1 State High School. The centre was established on 28 March 2004, on some seven acres of land.

The American Baptist Missionary Union had been active in the area at the turn of the 20th century and established a number of churches.

== Notable people ==
- Ba Maw - Burmese political leader
- Khin Maung Yin - actor and singer
- Thein Nyunt - government minister
- Pe Aung - academic
- Thet Naing Win - army general and government minister
