= Nyaungdon =

Nyaungdon ညောင်တုန်းမြို့
- Town
- Location within Myanmar
- Coordinates: 17.046096°N 95.637382°E
- Country: Myanmar
- Region: Ayeyarwady Region
- District: Ma-ubin District
- Township: Nyaungdon Township

Area
  - Total: 2.93 sq mi (7.6 km^{2})

Population (2023)
  - Total: 26,246
  - Density: 8,960/sq mi (3,460/km^{2})
- Time zone: UTC+6:30 (MMT)

Nyaungdon (Burmese: ညောင်တုန်းမြို့ [ɲàʊɰ̃dóʊɰ̃ mjo̰]) is a town in the Ayeyarwady Region of south-west Myanmar on the Pan Hlaing River near the difluence with the Ayeyarwaddy River. It is the seat of the Nyaungdon Township in the Maubin District. It is divided into 10 wards.

== History ==
The name Nyaungdon is thought have meant "boat dock" in the Mon language. A village by the name of Nyaungdon existed at the difluence of the Irrawaddy River and its distributary the Pan Hlaing River. The village was elevated to town status in 1884 by the British colonial government.

In 2015, the town had a population of 23,534 which grew to 23,684 in 2019. In 2023, it had 26,245 people.

== Notable people ==
Nyaungdon is the hometown of several prominent Burmese writers, poets, and artists.

Influential visual artist and cartoonist Ba Gyan grew up in Nyaungdon before moving to Yangon for college before starting his comics career.

Other notable people include writers Lin Yun Thit Lwin, Yaung Ni, Tekkatho Han Win Aung, Tekkatho Nyi Lwin Maung, Tekkatho Nyo Nyo Thein, and July Moe, poets Pho Thaukkya, musicians Sandaya U Aung Ko, Zeya Pwint, Saw Tun Naing, Htay Win, Min Htet Tha, directors Shwe Done Bi Aung, Shwedon Htun Lwin, actors Tun Tun Naing, May Thinza U, Nyi Nyi Tun Lwin, San San Aye, Wai Lu Kyaw, and painter Win Myint Moe.
