= Pe Aung =

- Born: Pe Aung; 9 April 1917; Malatto Village, Maubin, Myanmar
- Died: 5 July 2006 (aged 89); Myanmar
- Education: University of Rangoon, Columbia University
- Writing career
- Pen name: Pe Aung
- Period: 1917–2006
- Genre: Scholar
- Notable work: Book of Samatha

Pe Aung (9 April 1917 – 5 July 2006) was a professor and author from Myanmar. Born in Malatto Village, Maubin to parents U Chan Tha and Daw Hla Zin, his most famous work is titled Book of Samatha.

== Early life and education ==
When Pe Aung passed the matriculation Exam in Maubin, he continued to study at the University of Rangoon and earned M.A. degree. At the age of thirty, he got M.S. degree in Library Science from Columbia University.

== Career ==
He served as a Director at the International Buddhist University, Chairman of Buddhist Research Association of Burma, Professor at Department of Philosophy, Rangoon University, Consultant in the Ministry of Education and Chairman of Research Association of Myanmar.

== Literary work ==
In 1950, Pe Aung earned M.A. degree from the University of Rangoon by submitting Book of Samatha that is written in English. This book was translated into Burmese by U Aung Tin in 1952. "The nature of developing mind", published in 1977 was also the Burmese version of it translated by Nanda Thein Zan.
