= Maubin Township =

Maubin Township မအူပင် မြို့နယ်
- Township
- Location in Maubin District
- Coordinates: 16°44′N 95°39′E
- Country: Myanmar
- Region: Ayeyarwady Region
- District: Ma-ubin District
- Administrative seat: Maubin

Area
  - Total: 515.38 sq mi (1,334.83 km^{2})
- Elevation: 13.62 ft (4.15 m)

Population (2023)
  - Total: 345,649
  - Density: 670.667/sq mi (258.946/km^{2})
- Time zone: UTC+6:30 (MST)

Maubin Township (Burmese: မအူပင်မြို့နယ် [məʔùbɪ̀ɰ̃ mjo̰nɛ̀]), alternatively spelt Ma-ubin Township is a township of Maubin District in the Ayeyarwady Region of Myanmar. The Township borders Kyaiklat Township of Pyapon District to its south. Its western border is defined by the Irrawaddy River with Wakema Township of Myaungmya District to its west and Pantanaw Township to the northwest. Its north and northwest borders are within Maubin District with Nyaungdon Township completing the northeastern border. The township's eastern border follows the Khittaya-yaykyaw stream until it meets the Toe River, which it then follows. Yangon Region's Twantay Township borders it to the east bank of these water bodies. There are 12 urban wards and 76 village tracts totaling 442 villages in the township. The principal town of the township is Maubin.

Maubin is the birthplace of Ba Maw, first premier of British Burma and head of the State of Burma during the Second World War.

== History ==
In 1852, following the Second Anglo-Burmese War, Lower Burma was incorporated as Pegu District with the village of Maubin being organized within Dala subtownship. In 1875, Pegu District was split into 3 districts, and S.T. Smith set up administrative headquarters in Maubin, combining three smaller villages into the town of Maubin within Irrawaddy District.

In 1903, the Twante Canal opened connecting the Yangon River to the Toe River at Maubin Township's eastern edge. The vast majority of inland carrier traffic would continue through the township connecting Yangon with cities further up the Irrawaddy River.

In 2008, Cyclone Nargis devastated the Irrawaddy Delta. The Burmese military offered convoys to refugees to Maubin Township to escape the devastation in the worst-hit areas. Large swaths of the township were inundated with water, especially hitting the eastern half of the township significantly.

== Geography ==
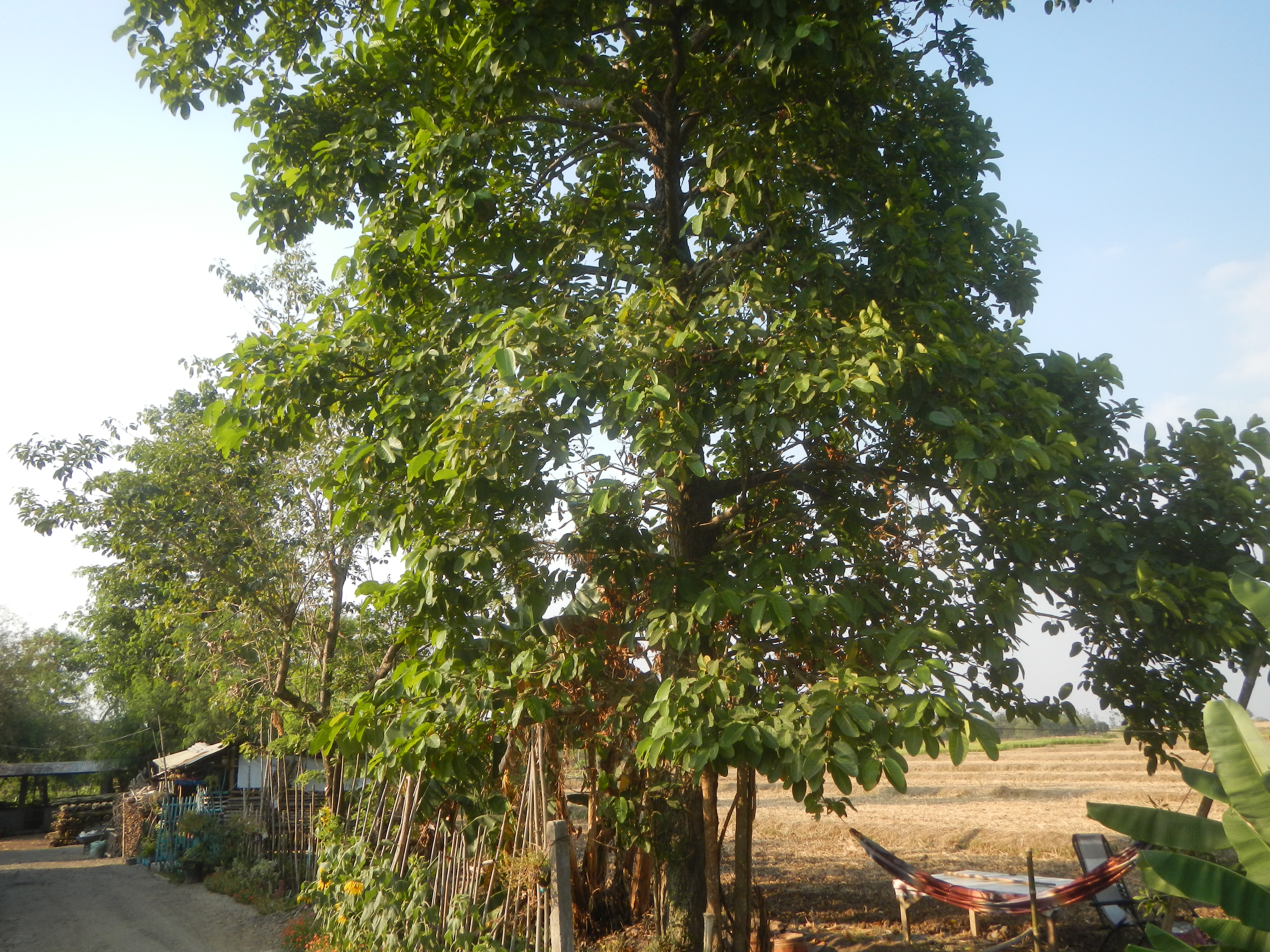
Ma-u trees

Maubin Township is located in the low-lying Irrawaddy Delta in Lower Myanmar along the Ayeyarwady River. There are many streams and rivers within the township, generally flowing from north to south. The most prominent rivers are the Irrawaddy, Toe and Yazutaing River. Most water resources in the town are freshwater, with the main river channels reaching a low depth of 60 feet (18 m) in the dry season, remaining navigable for most ships.

The township is largely dominated by agricultural land with 74.86% of the township's land used for agriculture. A significant portion of remaining lands are wetlands or utilized for irrigation. Within those areas, the township is home to many kokko, karoi, mango, palm and bamboo trees as well as the township's eponymous Ma-u trees. The township government has been engaged in conservation attempts, including planting more trees on the sides of roads and rice paddies. Despite this, the township has few notable fauna. The rivers of the town is home to many freshwater fish, including the bronze featherback which is an important food source in the area.

Ma-ubin Township is located in a hot tropical zone with a heavy monsoon presence. Over the 2010s decade, average highs and lows ranged between 37.5 °C and 13.8 °C, respectively. The average year saw 120 days of rain with an average rainfall of 95.67 inches (243.0 cm) per year. High winds from tropical storms remain an issue in the township with 397 houses destroyed during 2019.

== Demographics ==
Historical Population
Year	Maubin Township	±%
2014	304,093	—
2018	320,315	+5.3%
2019	320,503	+0.1%
2022	342,712	+6.9%
2023	345,649	+0.9%
Source: Ministry of Labor, Immigration, and Population and General Administration Department data

Maubin Township is relatively rural with 87.2% of the population in 2019 living outside of Maubin, which is the only town in the township. The predominant religion is Buddhism, practiced by 79.23% of the population with the second largest religious group being Christians at 20.1%.

The median age in the eastern portion of the town is 26.8 years with a mean household size of 4.3 persons. There are 95 males for every 100 females in the township. In 2014, only 4.4% of households had access to electricity and 47.5% of households relied on natural streams for their household water usage.

Some prominent places of worship in the town are Shwe Phone Myint Pagoda, dating back to 1890 in Maubin's 2nd ward, and the Paw Taw Mu Pagoda, an ancient pagoda situated in the southern part of the town on the Toe River. The old Paw Taw Mu pagoda fell in 2002 following river erosion of the bank but it was rebuilt on 22 May 2005 under government guidance. The town is also home to St. Rita's Catholic Church established in 1903 by the Foreign Missions of Paris serving 8,902 Catholics in the immediate Maubin area today.

== Economy ==
The economy of Maubin Township is predominantly agriculture, like much of the Irrawaddy delta. Its primary exports to Yangon Region is rice and meats- primarily chicken, duck and fish. Farmers in the township use chicken manure, combined with NPK fertilizer, to achieve high yields of the TheeHtet Yin variety of jasmine rice.

The township's close proximity to Yangon city fuels its meat and fish industry while its well-connected roads help its rice, mungo bean and sweet corn industries. Less prominent but significant products of the township's agriculture include mango, black pelun beans, limes, pork and freshwater fish from fish farms. The fishery sector has seen the greatest development in the 21st century, with land use for fish farming growing faster than other industries in the township.

Rare job opportunities, low income from agricultural work, inaccessible education services and preference for non-rural work have driven significant out-migration from the township. Mechanization of agriculture in the township has kept agricultural productivity at the same level. However, remittances became a new significant source of income in the township with 95% of emigrants sending money back to their families in the township. Although those receiving remittances saw an increase in quality of life, the township's elderly still have a low daily activity level and quality of life, which may impact the township's higher prevalence of anemia and stroke.

The township has 18 dams and 3 reservoirs, irrigating the townships' many fields. There are three factories within the township that produce paper, jute products and milled rice.

== List of Village Tracts ==
The following are Maubin Township's 76 village tracts in the township, which group together 470 recognised villages as of 2024.

- Ah Chan
- Ah Gar
- Ah Lan
- Ah Lan Gyi
- Aing Waing
- Auk Htone
- Aung Bon
- Aung Heik
- Bee Lin
- Chauk
- Ein Yar Gyi
- Hman Pin
- Hta Nee
- Hta Yaw Nyaung Waing
- Hta Yaw Pay Kone
- Hta Yaw Sa Khan Gyi
- Hta Yaw Wa
- Htan Pin Kwayt (East)
- Inn Ma
- Inn Tay
- Ka Nin Wa
- Ka Nu
- Ka Wet Kin
- Kan Kone
- Kha Naung
- Kha Naung Htaw
- Kun Su
- Kyaung
- Kyee Chaung
- Kyon Nat Taw
- Kyon Soke
- Kyon Tar Ka Lay
- Kyon Thin
- Kyon War
- Kywe Done
- Kywe Gat
- Lay Ein Su
- Let Kyar Gyi
- Let Pan Kone
- Ma Let To
- Mee Thway Chaung
- Min Baw
- Nat Sin
- Nga Gyi Ga Yet
- Nga Hpei Oh
- Ngar Hpar Aing
- Nyaung Pin Ga Yet
- Nyaung Waing
- Pan Pin Su
- Pan Ta Put
- Pauk Kone
- Pay Kone
- Pe Kho Su
- Pein Chaung
- Sagaing
- Seik Thar
- Shwe Hlay Thaung
- Shwe Taung Hmaw
- Sit Chaung
- Sun Thaik
- Ta Loke Lat (East)
- Ta Loke Lat (West)
- Tar Pat (East)
- Tar Pat (West)
- Taw Ta Loke
- Thaik Kone
- Thar Yar Kone
- Thaung Zar
- Thea Hpyu
- Thon Kyaing
- Thone Gwa
- Thu Htay Kone
- War Taw
- Wea Daunt
- Yae Le Gyi
- Yae Le Ka Lay
