= Pyamalaw River =

River in Myanmar

Coordinates: 15°49′N 94°42′E

The Pyamalaw River (Pyanmalot River) is a river in Ayeyawady Division in south-western Burma (Myanmar). It is a distributary of the Irrawaddy. The Pyamalaw River forms the boundary between Wakema Township and Einme Township of Ayeyawady Region.

It is to be crossed by the Kyungon Bridge.
