= Einme =

Town in Ayeyarwady Region, Myanmar

Coordinates: 16°54′N 95°11′E

Einme Town

Einme (Burmese: အိမ်မဲမြို့) is a town in the Ayeyarwady Division of south-west Myanmar. It is the seat of the Einme Township in the Myaungmya District.

Einme is divided into 5 wards: Chaungwa, Upper, Einmegyi, Lepaw and Sarchunkhan. It is located near the unopened, but complete Pathein-Pantanaw railway/Pathein-Yangon railway. and near the intersections of the Myaungmya-Kyaunggon road and the Yangon-Pathein highway. Both the railway and major roadway intersections cross the Einme Stream just north of the town's boundary. The town sits on the eastern bank of the Einme stream, likely named after the town itself.
