= Wakema =

Coordinates: 16°36′0″N 95°11′0″E

Wakema is a town in the Ayeyarwady Division of south-west Myanmar. It is the seat of the Wakema Township in the Myaungmya District. It is home to the Government Technological Institute, Wakema (formerly the Government Technical Institute, Wakema). Wakema is also the hometown of Sayadaw U Pannya Vamsa, a notable Buddhist missionary.

== Notable residents ==
- U Nu, first Prime Minister of Burma
