= Ba Gyan =

Burmese cartoonist

- ဘဂျမ်း
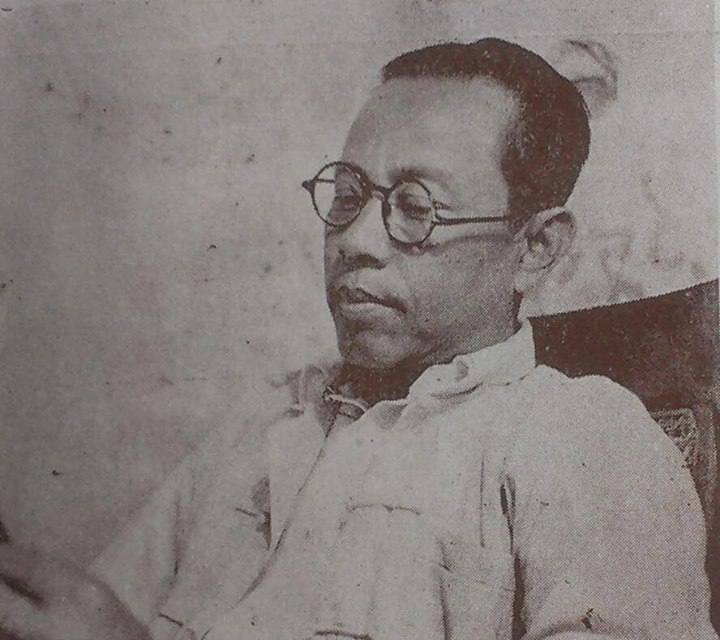
- Born: 1902; Nyaungdon, British Burma
- Died: 1953 (aged 50–51); Myanmar
- Known for: Cartoonist
- Movement: Traditional Burmese Art
- Awards: Alinka Kyawswa

Ba Gyan comic, early 1950s

Ba Gyan (Burmese: ဘဂျမ်း [ba̰ dʑáɰ̃]; 1902–1953) was a pioneering Burmese cartoonist who created the first cartoon movie released in Burma in 1935. Ba Gyan's cartoons covered a wide variety of topics and events, and ridiculed human frailties such as discourtesy, dishonesty, snobbery, arrogance, inefficiency and sloth.

Ba Gyan was born in 1902 at Nyaungdon, the son of a silk merchant. He was admitted to Yangon College in 1924, and the University magazine included his first cartoon in 1926. After that, his work began to appear in several journals, including the Phauk Seit cartoon in the Thuriya newspaper. He also drew Magazine covers and water colour paintings, and wrote novels under the pen name Thonnya, meaning zero. He created the cartoon films Kyetaungwa in 1934 and Athuya in 1935, working with cartoonist Hein Son.

Ba Gyan's 1937 comic book Ko Pyoo and Ma Pyone was the first Myanmar comic for young people. He pioneered the crucial role of news cartoons in newspapers such as The Botataung, The Mirror and Myanma Alin. After the war, his Zayakati cartoon appeared in the Hanthawaddy newspaper. During a drive to stamp out corruption in the post-independence period, he collaborated with Ngwe Gaing to produce a series of powerful and effective posters. It is said that after the death of his wife around 1948, his cartoon character "Hpyauk Seik" began to appear in the garb of a holy mendicant, reflecting his sorrow. But he continued to produce the cartoon.

Ba Gyan won the Alinka Kyawswa award for his artistic skill. He used to hold a cartoon show on 13th street, where he lived, each year during Tazaungdaing festival, a custom that was continued after his death by his pupils such as cartoonist Pe Thein. Although the annual show was later abandoned, it was revived in 2010. In June 2002, an exhibition of his cartoons was staged at the meeting hall of Myanmar Traditional Artists and Artisans in Yangon, with speakers talking about his work, to celebrate the 100th anniversary of his birth. The celebration included a competition for modern Burmese cartoonists.

He is featured in the Grade 6 Burmese textbook used all over the country.
