= Talay =

Talay is a Turkish and Belarusian (Belarusian: Талай) surname. It is also used as a masculine given name. Polish counterpart of the Belarusian surname: Tałaj. People with the name include:

== Surname ==
- Alina Talay (born 1989), Belarusian track and field athlete
- Ayshe Talay-Ongan (born 1947), Turkish-born Australian author
- İstemihan Talay (born 1945), Turkish politician
- Türkiz Talay (born 1974), Turkish-German actress
- Ufuk Talay (born 1976), Australian football (soccer) player

== Given name ==
- Talay Riley (1990–2026), British musician
- Talay Sanguandikul (born 1995), Thai actor
