= Wakema Township =

Township in Ayeyarwady Region, Myanmar

Wakema Township ဝါးခယ်မမြို့နယ်
- Township
- Location in Myaungmya district
- Coordinates: 16°37′N 95°17′E
- Country: Myanmar
- Region: Ayeyarwady Region
- District: Myaungmya District
- Capital: Wakema

Area
  - Total: 459.52 sq mi (1,190.16 km^{2})
- Elevation: 4.9 ft (1.5 m)

Population (2019)
  - Total: 301,902
  - Density: 656.989/sq mi (253.665/km^{2})
  - Ethnicities: Bamar; Karen
- Time zone: UTC+6:30 (MMT)

Wakema Township (Burmese: ဝါးခယ်မမြို့နယ် [wákʰɛ̀ma̰ mjo̰nɛ̀]) is a township of Myaungmya District in central Ayeyarwady Region, Myanmar. The first Prime Minister of Burma, U Nu was born in the principal town, Wakema.

Wakema Township is bordered to its west by the other townships within its district, Einme Township and Myaungmya Township. To its south, it borders Labutta Township and Mawlamyinegyun Township of Labutta District. On its east, it shares a small border with Kyaiklat Township in Pyapon District. To its northeast, it borders Maubin Township and Pantanaw Township in Maubin District. The town consists of two towns, 15 urban wards, 126 village tracts and 581 villages. The township's two towns are its principal town Wakema and Kyonmangay.

== Geography ==
Wakema Township is located in the Irrawaddy Delta and is a low-lying area prone to flooding during the monsoon season. There are many freshwater rivers and streams within the township including the Wakema, Shwelaung, Yazutaing and Pyanmalot Rivers.

71% of the township's land is used for farming with no wild or preserved areas. Flora and fauna are limited to farmlands groves maintained along roads or property lines by residents and government efforts. There are some wild red mangrove trees in inundated lands in the township's south. The township claims that there are no significant wild animals within the town. However, detailed studies have found threatened and near-threatened bird species within the wetlands- the yellow-breasted bunting, the sarus crane and the striated grassbirds. the Jerdon's babbler was rediscovered in the area in 2019 after being last seen within Myanmar in 1941.

== Demographics ==
Historical Population
Year	Wakema Township	±%
1973		—
1983		—
2014	289,106	—
2018	306,334	+6.0%
2019	301,902	−1.4%
Source: Ministry of Labor, Immigration, and Population data, General Administration Department

Wakema Township is relatively rural with 87% of the population living outside the two urban areas- Wakema and Kyonmangay. In 2014, the urban population was only 7.7%. In 2014, 30.3% of the township's population was under the age of 14. There were 95 men for every 100 men in the township. The township has a percentage of working age people when compared nationally. In particular, there is a markedly lower population of people 15–29 years old (born 1985–1999). Furthermore, the town has seen a notable decline in population in the 2010s.

The majority religion is Buddhism at 91.6% of the population. The second largest religion is Christianity at 3.45%. The township consists of 67,823 households with an average household size of 4.45 persons.

The township was one of a few townships outside Kayin State with a majority Karen ethnic population in 2019. In 2024, the town is now 50.46% majority Bamar.

== Economy and Transport ==
The township generally has slow economic growth and sees difficulty traveling and trading with neighbouring cities due to lacklustre transportation infrastructure. The primary industry of the township is agriculture with a large majority of the town dedicated to farmland. Like other townships, the primary crop is rice with pulses and chilies as important secondary crops. The pulses of Wakema Township are typically destined for Indonesia where its small, green-coloured grain is well known. The golden apple snail is a prevalent pest that poses one of the most important problems to year-round rice farmers in the township. There are no animal husbandry zones within the township, but the raising of cows, water buffalo, poultry and fish remaining important aspects of the township's agricultural industry. There are several factories and industrial operations in Wakema- predominantly rice milling and fish processing plants.

The township relies primarily on waterways for transport and has no rail connections. There are roadways within the town, but they lacked accessible bridges to nearby cities until the 21st century. The township is connected to the Einme Township across the Kyungon Bridge on the Pyanmalot River. The bridge was opened in 2009 and commissioned on 20 March 2022, by State Administration Council member Aye Nu Sein.

== List of Village Tracts ==
The following are Wakema Township's 128 village tracts in the township, which group together 590 recognised villages as of 2024.

- Ah Htet Pay Kone
- Ah Htet Thet Kei
- Ah La Man Kyaung Su
- Ah Lan
- Ah Nauk Da Yin
- Ah Shey Da Yin
- Au Kyun
- Auk Pay Kone
- Auk Thet Kei
- Aye Chaung
- Ba Lay
- Ba Maw
- Be Chaung
- Boe Bay Ah Nyar Su
- Ga Yan
- Gan Chaung
- Gaw Thu Thaung
- Gway Chaung
- Hin Thar Htone
- Hnget Kya
- Hnget Pyaw Chaung
- Hpoe Thar Khway
- Hpoet Kha Mi Daunt
- Htan Lay Pin
- Htaw Ka Nut
- Htee Pa Nan
- Hti Tan
- Ka Ka La
- Ka Ka Taik
- Ka La
- Ka Leik Kyon Pa Toke
- Ka Na Soe Kone
- Ka Wea Inn Chaung
- Ka Wea Kywe Ta Lin
- Ka Wea Nyaung Chaung
- Kan Kwin
- Kan Pyo
- Kan Thar Kone
- Khway Lay
- Kin Wa Gyi
- Kun Chaung Thar Yar Kone
- Kun Thee Chaung Lay
- Kwin Chaung
- Kya Khat Kone
- Kyar Hpyu
- Kyar Kwin Kyun Kyar
- Kyon Da Yan Than Din
- Kyon Hta Yeik
- Kyon Ka Naung
- Kyon Ka Pyin
- Kyon Kha Yar
- Kyon La Tar
- Kyon La Tar Wa
- Kyon Ma Ngay
- Kyon Pa Di Kyon Pa Taw
- Kyon Pa Toke Wa Kyon Oe
- Kyon Pauk
- Kyon Taing
- Kyun Deik
- Kyun Kone
- Kyun Pyat That
- Lan Tha Maing Ywar Gyi
- Lan Tha Maing Ywar Lay
- Let Khoke
- Let Pan (Let Pan Taung)
- Let Pan Su
- Ma Yan Chaung
- Man Ka Leit Ngu Taw
- Maung Dee
- Me Za Li
- Min Lan Ka Sa Ke
- Moe Ma Kha Kone
- Mya Goe Gyi
- Mya Goe Lay
- Myauk Khon
- Myin Ka Kone
- Myit Ka Lay
- Myo Chaung Gyi
- Myo Chaung Lay
- Nant Ae Laung
- Nyaung Ngu
- Nyaung Pin Thar
- Ohn Pin
- Pa Day Tha Kone
- Paik Tan
- Pan Ku
- Pauk Tein
- Pay Taw
- Peik Tar Lay
- Pyin Ma Kwin
- Sa Lu Chaung
- Sa Par Yoe
- San Eik
- San Pya
- Sat Htone
- Saw Ke
- Shauk Chaung
- Shwe Kone
- Shwe Laung
- Sin Ku
- Sit Chaung
- Ta Dar Gyi
- Ta Khun Taing Sit Tan
- Ta Laing Su
- Taik Ku Lar
- Taung Au Chaung Hpyar
- Taung Au Tha Byu
- Tei Pin
- Tha Pyay Chaung
- Tha Yet Chaung
- Tha Yet Ngu
- Tha Yet Taw
- Tha Ywet Myaik
- Thea Kone
- Thet Kei
- Thi Hla Chaung
- Thit Chaint
- Thit Hpyu Chaung
- Tone Le Chaung
- Tu Chaung
- Tyein Kyun
- U Gyi Taw
- U Peik Htoke Ywar Ma
- Wea Gyi
- Wea Ywar Kyon Sein
- Yae Lein
- Yae Lel Kyun
- Zoke Ka Ni
