= 2014 Myanmar census =

National census of Myanmar undertaken in 2014

Myanmar census 2014
- 30 March 2014 – 10 April 2014

General information
- Country: Myanmar (Burma)

Results
- Total population: 51,486,253 (▲45.6%)
- Most populous region: Yangon Region (7,355,075)
- Least populous region: Kayah State (286,738)

The Myanmar census 2014 (Burmese: ၂၀၁၄ ခုနှစ် လူဦးရေနှင့် အိမ်အကြောင်းအရာ သန်းခေါင်စာရင်း) was a nationwide census between 30 March and 10 April 2014 in Myanmar (Burma). 100,000 school teachers counted the population at midnight 29 March. The theme of the census campaign was A nationwide census – Let us all Participate.

== Introduction ==
The government officially recognises 135 ethnic groups. Major groups include the majority Bamar ethnic group, and the Chin, Karen, Kayah, Kachin, Mon, Rakhine and Shan, each of which gives its name to a state.

The earliest recorded Burmese census was taken in 1359 in the Pinya Kingdom. The first nationwide census was taken in 1638, and it was followed by two other nationwide censuses in 1784 and 1803. The first modern census was taken in 1891 in the British colonial period. It was carried out in 10-year intervals until 1941. After independence, the government conducted a census in 1953/54. Two more censuses were taken in 1973 and 1983 by Gen. Ne Win's military government. According to the 1983 census, the population of the country was 35,442,972, and the Bamar accounted for 69 per cent of the population. The Burmese government estimated the population to be 60.98 million in October 2012, based on approximate reproduction rates.

The census was taken in 80,985 areas across the nation. Officials prepared 41 questions for households and 11 questions for organizations.

== Challenges ==
The census faces several challenges. In the past censuses of 1973 and 1983, the country's ongoing armed conflicts put many parts of the country out of reach. As a result, several thousands of people (many of whom were hill-tribe peoples) in border regions were never counted. Another challenge is to ensure that everyone, regardless of citizenship, is counted. These include the Rohingya in northern Rakhine State, who are officially classified as stateless, as well as hundreds of thousands of immigrants from China, who have illegally entered the country since the last census. Other challenges include a systemic lack of expertise—most of the civil servants who worked on the 1973 and 1983 censuses are now retired or deceased/unfindable, low levels of awareness among the population about the census, and the difficulty of reaching areas with active fighting such as Kachin State, Shan State and Kayin State.

The Burmese government plans in the 2014 census to count Burmese refugees living in Thailand, who are estimated to number 130,000 people and Burmese nationals living abroad. Rohingya, described as Bengalis in Myanmar, will be counted under the "Other" ethnicity category on the census, along with ethnic Chinese and Pakistani residents. On 29 March 2014, the government banned the word Rohingya and asked Muslims to register themselves as Bengalis despite UN assurances. In protest, most Rohingyas boycotted the census.

On 16 March 2014, Rakhine mobs protested across Rakhine State, egged on by monk Ashin Wirathu demanding that the census be stopped or changed to prevent the Rohingyas from being able to define their ethnicity. Furthermore, according to The Economist, "There are also fears of a backlash from Buddhist nationalists, should the census show, as many think it will, that the Muslim population is more than double the official estimate of 4 million."

== International support ==
The United Nations has agreed to assist the Burmese government in conducting the census. In the two years leading up to the census, UNFPA assisted in surveyor training and drafting the census forms.

The estimated total cost of the census is US$58.5 million, of which the Burmese government is paying US$15 million. The UNFPA is contributing US$5 million and Britain's Department for International Development (DFID) has donated over US$16 million. The United Nations and foreign governments including the United States, and Australia have pledged to help bridge the gap.

== Population profile ==
=== Provisional results ===
Provisional results were released in August 2014. The data were from the Enumeration Area Summary sheets, completed by enumerators and verified by supervisors in the field. The provisional results provided the total population by sex and administrative unit, from national, state/region, district down to township level. It also showed the population sizes of Yangon, Mandalay, Naypyidaw and state/region capitals. Other information included were indicators such as sex ratio and population density.

The results showed that the total population is 51,419,420—a figure well below the last available official population estimate of 60.98 million in October 2012. This total population included 50,213,067 persons counted during the census and an estimated 1,206,353 persons in parts of northern Rakhine State, Kachin State and Kayin State who were not counted. More females (51.8%) were counted than males (48.2%). People who were out of the country at the time of the census are not included in these figures.

==== Proportion of population ====
The most populated areas were Yangon Region (14.3%), Ayeyawady Region (12.0%) and Mandalay Region (12.0%). The least populated areas were Naypyidaw Union Territory (2.3%), Chin State (0.9%) and Kayah State (0.6%).

==== Sex ratio ====
Overall, there were 93 males for every 100 females in the country. Only in Kachin State were there more males than females; in Kayah and Shan State the numbers of males and females were almost equal. The rest of the states and regions had more females than males.

==== Population in towns and cities ====
There were 14,864,119 persons living in Wards (urban areas) throughout the country. This represented 29.6% of the total population. Yangon Region was the most urbanised (70.1%), followed by Kachin State (36.0%). Magway Region (15.1%) and Ayeyawady Region (14.1%) were the least urbanised.

==== Population density ====
The results showed a nationwide population density of 76 per square kilometre (200/sq mi). Yangon Region was the most densely populated Region, (723 per square kilometre (1,870/sq mi)), followed by Mandalay (206 per square kilometre (530/sq mi)). The least densely populated States were Kachin State (19 per square kilometre (49/sq mi)) and Chin State (13 per square kilometre (34/sq mi)).

==== Average household sizes ====
The provisional census results indicated that there were 10,889,348 households in Myanmar. On average, 4.4 people lived in each household in the country. The average household size was highest in Kachin State and Chin State at 5.1. The lowest household sizes were observed in Ayeyawady Region, Bago Region, Magway Region and Naypyidaw Union Territory, each at 4.1.

=== Main results ===
The main results, released in May 2015, comprise two series of publications containing detailed national and regional information, and a report for each of the 15 states and regions in the country. It contains text, tables, graphs and maps on the size and geographical distribution of the population by sex and age, marital status, education, economic characteristics, fertility, mortality, migration and the characteristics of housing units and household amenities.

The publication of main census results that require manual coding and further consultations is planned for early 2016. This publication will contain thematic analysis reports on the major topics covered in the census.

Migrants who had left to neighboring nations for work were naturally not included in population reports. A fair percentage had returned after the census due to undocumented labor crackdowns.

== See also ==
- List of townships of Myanmar by total fertility rate
