= Faith Baptist Bible College & Theological Seminary (Myanmar) =

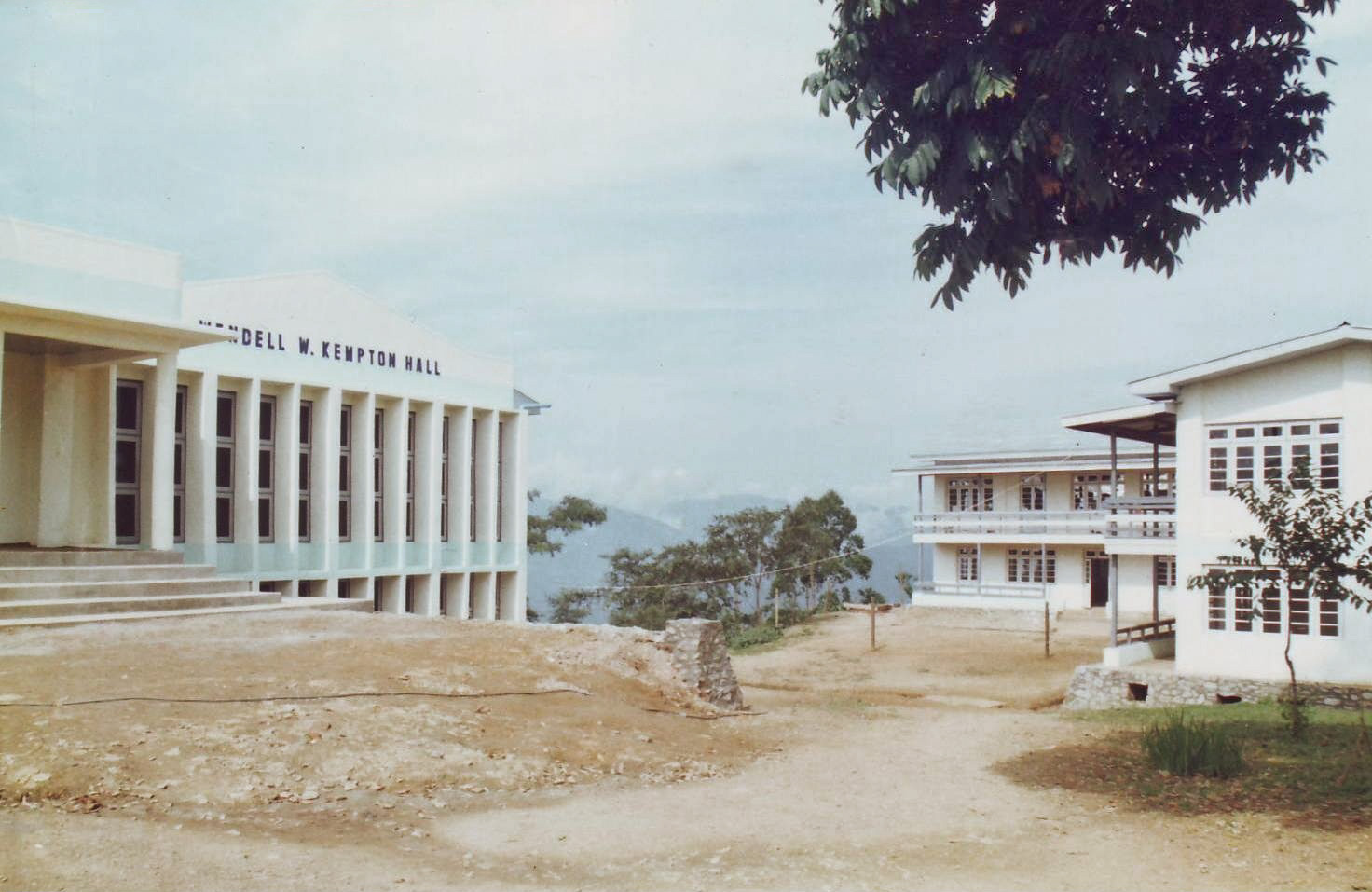
- Campus in Tedim
- Other names: FBBC & FBTS
- Motto: ...earnestly contend for the FAITH...
- Type: Private Bible college and seminary
- Established: 1986
- Affiliations: Baptist
- President: Do Suan Mung
- Location: Tedim and Yangon, Myanmar
- Colors: Blue and Dijon
- Mascot: The Lighthouse

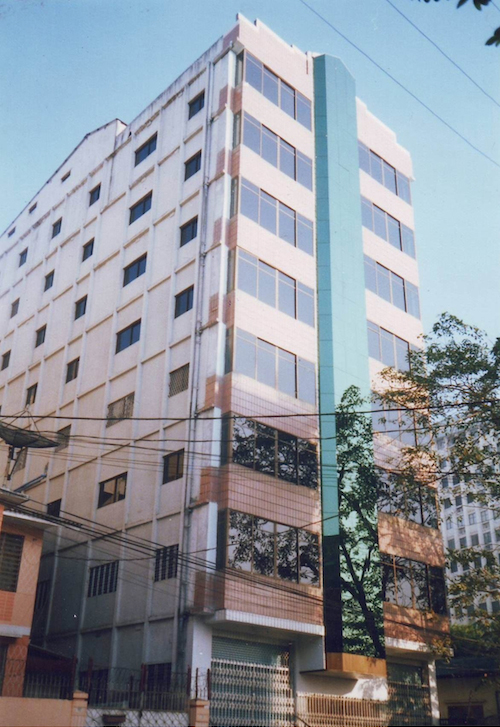
Faith Baptist Theological Seminary Building, Yangon

Faith Baptist Bible College & Theological Seminary is a private Baptist Bible college based in Tedim, Chin State and in Yangon, Myanmar (Burma).

== History ==
The college and seminary were founded in 1986 by Dr Do Suan Mung. Dr Mung died in 2021 and his son David Mung runs the college as of in 2024.

The two schools offer bachelor's, and master's degrees related to theology. By 2021, there were over 1500 graduates from the college.

== Programs ==
Faith Baptist Bible College

- (BABS) Bachelor of Arts in Biblical Studies (Full-time four-year program)
- (BAMin) Bachelor of Arts in Ministry (Full-time four-year program)

Faith Baptist Theological Seminary

- (M.Div.) Master of Divinity (Full-time two-year program)
- (MA) Master of Arts (Full-time two-year program)
