= Myaungmya =

Myaungmya မြောင်းမြမြို့
- Town
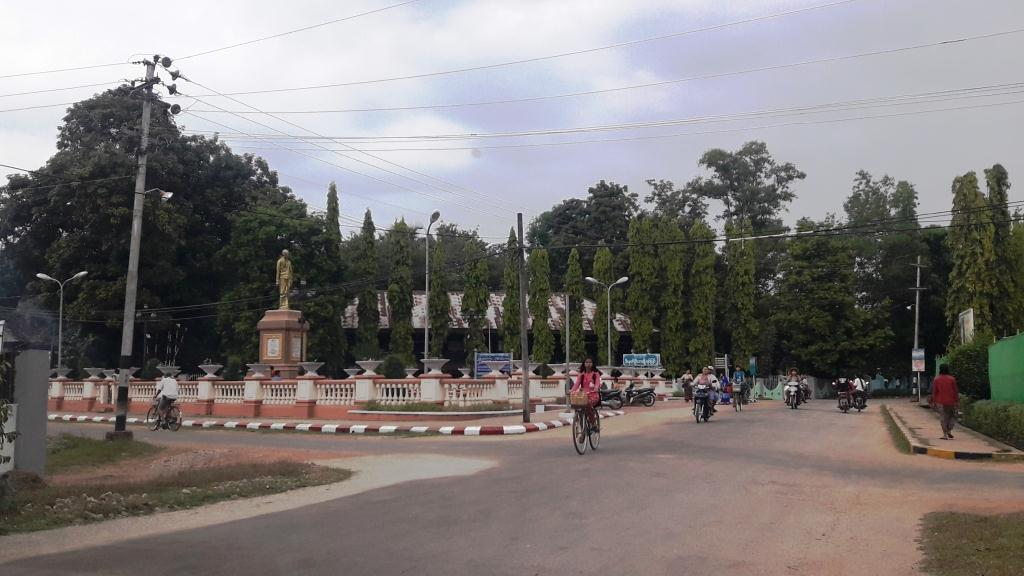

- Location in Myanmar
- Coordinates: 16°36′13″N 94°55′44″E
- Country: Myanmar
- Region: Ayeyarwady Region
- District: Myaungmya District
- Township: Myaungmya Township

Population (2023)
  - Total: 58,205
  - Ethnicities: Burman Karen
  - Religions: Buddhism Christianity Catholic
- Time zone: UTC+6:30 (MMT)

Myaungmya (Burmese: မြောင်းမြမြို့ [mjáʊɰ̃mja̰ mjo̰]) is the principal town of Myaungmya Township, Ayeyarwady Region, Myanmar.

The town is home to the Myanmar Union Adventist Seminary, a Seventh-day Adventist seminary and Myaungmya Education College. As of 2014 the population was 58,698.

== History ==
Myaungmya was referenced earliest in the Jambūdipa, a text dating to the reign of Kyansittha. The name "Myaungmya" originates from the Mon language name Mongmale (မံၚ်မၠ, lit. "where the Myaya plants are.") The old town of Myaungmya is an archaeological zone and a heritage preservation zone today.

The Viceroy of Myaungmya, Laukpya, rebelled against the Hanthawaddy kingdom during the reign of Binnya U in 1364 CE. By 1371, he had successfully taken control of the Bassein province and became the ruler of the Irrawaddy Delta as the Viceroy of Bassein-Myaungmya. During this period, Myaungmya was a heavily fortified city that resisted the siege of Binnya U's successor Razadarit during the Forty Years' War. Despite this, Myaungmya eventually surrendered to Razadarit after a battlefield loss in 1390.

Myaungmya is where Daw Khin Kyi, the wife of national leader General Aung San was born. It was also one of the towns where anti-colonial nationalistic education was implemented, with future Prime Minister U Nu serving as district education officer.

Another prominent independence figure and one of the martyrs remembered on Martyr's Day, Dee Doke U Ba Cho, was born in Myaungmya

Myaungmya city is the main exporter of rice in Myanmar. George Orwell served as assistant superintendent of police in Myaungmya in 1924.

== Demographics ==
In 2014, the population of the city was 55,270. In 2019, it had increased to 56,018 people.

== Climate ==
Climate data for Myaungmya (1981–2010)
Month	Jan	Feb	Mar	Apr	May	Jun	Jul	Aug	Sep	Oct	Nov	Dec	Year
Mean daily maximum °C (°F)	31.2 (88.2)	33.6 (92.5)	35.6 (96.1)	36.7 (98.1)	34.1 (93.4)	31.0 (87.8)	30.5 (86.9)	30.1 (86.2)	30.8 (87.4)	31.7 (89.1)	31.5 (88.7)	30.6 (87.1)	32.3 (90.1)
Mean daily minimum °C (°F)	15.0 (59.0)	17.2 (63.0)	19.5 (67.1)	22.0 (71.6)	22.5 (72.5)	22.3 (72.1)	21.9 (71.4)	21.5 (70.7)	21.6 (70.9)	21.5 (70.7)	19.6 (67.3)	16.1 (61.0)	20.1 (68.2)
Average rainfall mm (inches)	0.3 (0.01)	2.6 (0.10)	5.7 (0.22)	26.7 (1.05)	277.0 (10.91)	577.1 (22.72)	617.7 (24.32)	650.9 (25.63)	396.8 (15.62)	197.6 (7.78)	88.1 (3.47)	8.9 (0.35)	2,849.4 (112.18)
Source: Norwegian Meteorological Institute
