= Pantanaw =

Pantanaw ပန်းတနော်မြို့
- City
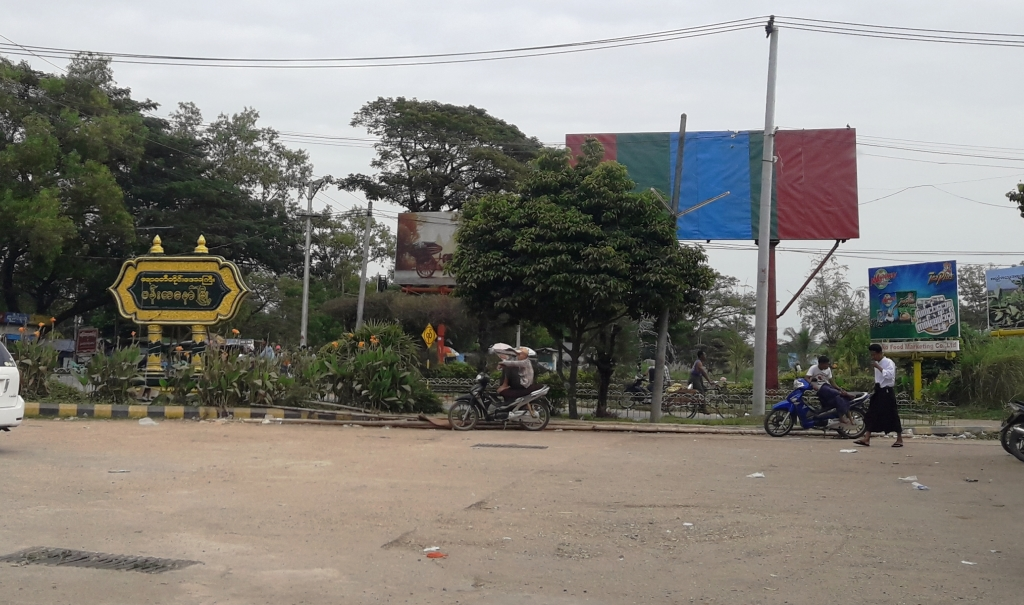
- City of Pantanaw

- Location in Myanmar
- Coordinates: 16°59′6″N 95°27′56″E
- Country: Myanmar
- Region: Ayeyarwady Region
- District: Ma-ubin District
- Township: Pantanaw Township

Area
  - Total: 0.56 sq mi (1.44 km^{2})
- Elevation: 30 ft (9 m)

Population (2023)
  - Total: 20,497
  - Density: 36,900/sq mi (14,200/km^{2})
  - Ethnicities: Karen; Bamar
  - Religions: Buddhism
- Time zone: UTC+6.30 (MST)

Pantanaw (Burmese: ပန်းတနော်မြို့ [páɰ̃tənɔ̀ mjo̰]) is a town in the Ayeyarwady Region of south-west Myanmar. It is the seat of the Pantanaw Township in the Maubin District. It is the hometown of former Secretary-General of the United Nations U Thant, who was known in Burmese naming convention as Pantanaw U Thant. The renowned modern painter Ba Nyan was also born in Pantanaw.

Former Prime Minister U Nu was a superintendent of schools in Pantanaw Township at the urge of his friend U Thant who was a headmaster at the school in Pantanaw.
