= Maubin District =

Administrative unit in Myanmar

Coordinates: 16°58′N 95°33′E

Maubin District (Burmese: မအူပင်ခရိုင် [məʔùbɪ̀ɰ̃ kʰəjàɪɰ̃]), formerly known as Thun-Khwa, is a district in Ayeyarwady Division, Myanmar. It consists of 39 wards, 235 village groups and 1642 villages organized into four townships - Maubin, Pantanaw, Nyaungdon and Danuphyu. The district lies on a flat plain, cut by many streams, which is 1,362 feet above sea level. It has an area of 1651.49 square miles (1,056,952 acres or 2657.82 square kilometres). The majority of the population are Burmese and Kayin nationals.

location in Ayeyarwady region

Four bridges provide access between different areas: Maubin Bridge in Taloatlatt, Khattiya Bridge near Latyargyi and Bokanbay, Pantanaw River-Crossing Bridge on Bayintnaung Street in Pantanaw, and Bomyathtun Bridge, which crosses the Ayeyarwady River from Taungtan to the vicinity of Kyeinpinsae. The grave of Commander in Chief Maharbandoola is located in the district, as is Danuphyu Fort, which was famous in the first Anglo Myanmar war and afterwards destroyed by a flood.
