= Myaungmya District =

District of Myanmar

Coordinates: 16°30′N 95°00′E

Myaungmya District (Burmese: မြောင်းမြခရိုင်) is a district of the Ayeyarwady Division in south western Myanmar. It consists of 5 cities. Myaungmya is the chief town of the district.

location in Ayeyarwady region

Myaungmya district was formed in 1893 out of a portion of Bassein district, and reconstituted until 1903. It has an area of 2,663 square miles (6,900 km^{2}) and a population of 280,000 and density of 104 inhabitants to the square mile. The district is a deltaic tract, bordering south on the sea and traversed by many tidal creeks. Rice cultivation and fishing occupy practically all the inhabitants of the district.

The district contains three townships: Myaungmya Township, Einme Township, and Wakema Township. In the Townships, there are 50 wards, 489 village groups and 2557 villages.
