= Khanom tan =

Thai dessert

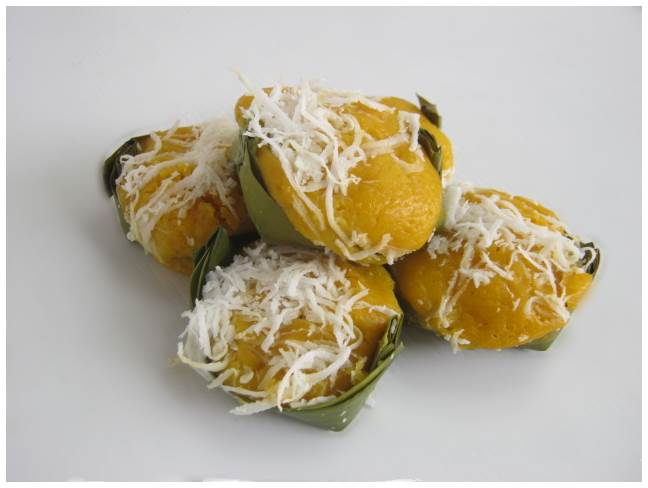
- Type: Dessert
- Place of origin: Thailand
- Region or state: Southeast Asia
- Main ingredients: Toddy palm, coconut milk, rice flour and sugar
- Similar dishes: Htanthi mont, Fa gao, Bánh bò, White sugar sponge cake

Khanom tan (Thai: ขนมตาล; pronounced [kʰā.nǒm tāːn]) is a traditional Thai dessert consisting of small steamed cakes flavoured with toddy palm sugar and coconut milk, wrapped in banana leaves, and topped with grated coconut. It is most often found in the provinces where sugar palm is grown, such as Phetchaburi, Nakhon Pathom and Suphanburi.

== Etymology ==
The Thai term tan /taːn˧/ (Thai: ตาล) has its origins in the Indic language, as evidenced by its appearance in the Ram Khamhaeng Inscription No. 1 Face 3 Line 13, dated to 1292 CE. It is derived from the Pali and Sanskrit word ताल /tāla/, which means "toddy palm" and is cognate to the Shan term htan* and the Northern Thai and Lao term tan. This connection can be seen in the similar spellings of tan and htan*, both ultimately derived from tāla as follows: tan ← htan*, tan ← tāla.

== History ==
Khanom Tan is a dessert that dates from the Sukhothai period. During that time, the main ingredients used in preparing desserts were rice flour, sugar and coconut, in contrast to desserts from the later Ayutthaya period, which are based on a mixture of eggs and sugar. Today, Khanom Tan is not well known among younger generations due to its disappearance from street markets, but it is still a popular Thai dessert outside of the Bangkok area.

== Preparation ==
Khanom tan is made using a similar technique to the steamed dessert khanom kluay, the key difference being that khanom tan requires the batter to be fermented to achieve a spongy texture. Khanom tan is made from coconut milk, rice flour, a raising agent and toddy palm fruit (palm sugar). Toddy palm fruit is rich in vitamins A and C, has a strong smell when crushed, and is juicy and soft, similar to lychee.

== See also ==
- Thai cuisine
- List of Thai desserts
- List of Thai dishes (includes names in Thai script)
