= Bor bor thnaut =

Cambodian dessert

- Alternative names: b'baw t'noat, borbor thnaut, bor bor tnaot, babor tnoat
- Type: rice pudding
- Course: dessert
- Place of origin: Cambodia
- Serving temperature: hot
- Main ingredients: glutinous rice, toddy palm seeds, coconut milk/coconut cream, sugar, salt, palm fruit juice

Bor bor thnaut (Khmer: បបរត្នោត) is a Cambodian rice pudding made with glutinous rice, toddy palm seeds, coconut milk or palm fruit juice, coconut cream, and sugar.

== Preparation and serving ==
Rinsed and soaked sticky rice is boiled in coconut milk with sugar and salt before adding peeled and sliced toddy palm seeds and bringing the mixture to a boil. It is served with coconut cream or coconut milk on top. Alternatively, sticky rice and toddy palm seeds are boiled in palm fruit juice before mixing in coconut cream.
