= Pyinsalu =

Pyinsalu ပြင်စလူမြို့
- Town
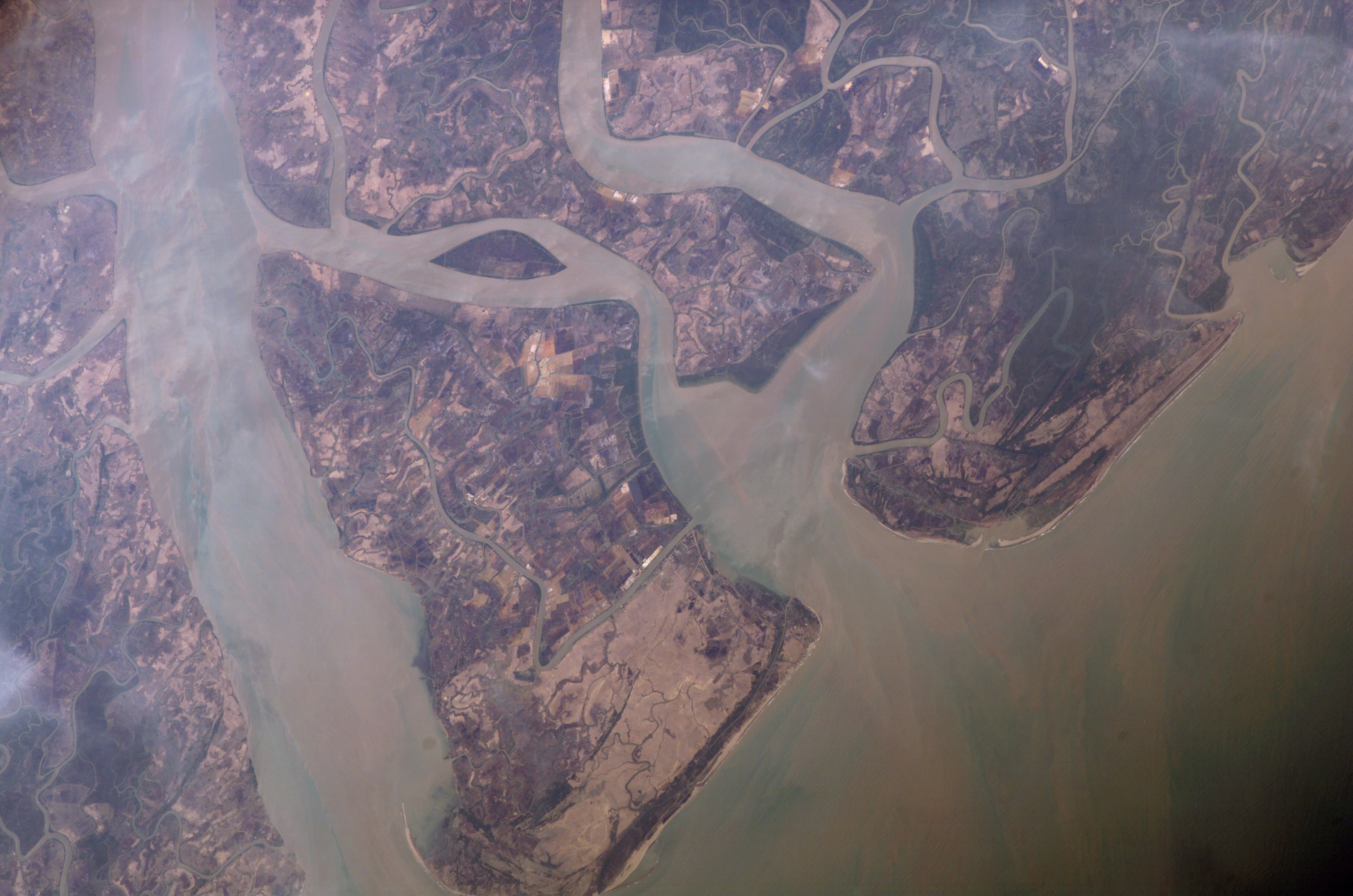
- View of Pyinsalu Island from the International Space Station
- Interactive map of Pyinsalu
- Coordinates: 15.825°N 94.809°E
- Country: Myanmar
- Region: Ayeyarwady Region
- District: Labutta District
- Township: Labutta Township
- Subtownship: Pyinsalu Subtownship

Area
  - Total: 1.40 sq mi (3.6 km^{2})

Population (2023)
  - Total: 2,483
  - Density: 1,770/sq mi (685/km^{2})
- Time zone: UTC+6.30 (MMT)

Pyinsalu (Burmese: ပြင်စလူမြို့, [pjɪ̀ɰ̃.sə.lú.mjo̼]) is a town in Labutta Township, Ayeyarwady Region of south-west Myanmar. It is the administrative seat of Pyinsalu Subtownship, an informal subdivision of Labutta Township used for statistical and administrative purposes. The town of Pyinsalu has 3 urban wards and 516 houses as of 2023 located on the southernmost parts of Labutta Township near the Pyinsalu distributary of the Irrawaddy River. According to the 2014 census, the town had 2217 people.

The town is located on Pyinsalu island, a deltaic island with a total area of about 40 square miles (100 km^{2}).

== Natural Disasters ==
The town saw a tsunami tide over 2 metres (6.6 ft) tall after the 2004 Indian Ocean Tsunami due to its location close to the Andaman Sea coast. However, like many other communities, damage and casualties were minimal only damaging two houses and causing no casualties in Pyinsalu.

The town is located about 35 miles (56 km) from Hainggyi island, where the 2008 Cyclone Nargis made landfall. The town and its surrounding subtownship was severely affected by the cyclone with emergency responses delayed by a lack of infrastructure. The government claims to have warned the town prior to the cyclone, but local residents told reporters otherwise. With few sturdy shelters, the village suffered significant damage and loss of life. The deaths in Pyinsalu were initially highly under-reported. Following the cyclone's damage, shelters have been built in the town with financial support from the UN Habitat programme and the European Union.
