= Htanthi mont =

Steamed rice cake

- Alternative names: Htan thi mont
- Type: Snack (mont)
- Place of origin: Myanmar (Burma)
- Region or state: Southeast Asia
- Associated cuisine: Burmese
- Main ingredients: rice, baking soda, coconut milk, sugar, toddy palm and coconut pulp
- Similar dishes: Khanom tan, Fa gao, Bánh bò, White sugar sponge cake, Kumbilappam

Htanthi mont (Burmese: ထန်းသီးမုန့်; pronounced [tʰáɴðímo̰ʊɴ], lit. 'toddy palm cake') is a traditional Burmese snack or mont. It bears resemblance to the Chinese fa gao.

This snack is a steamed rice cake made of pulverised cooked rice or rice flour, coconut milk, baking soda, sugar, and the pulp of slightly fermented toddy palm and coconut fruits, and then garnished with coconut shavings.
