= Mawlamyinegyun =

Mawlamyinegyun မော်လမြိုင်ကျွန်းမြို့ Moulmeingyun
- Town
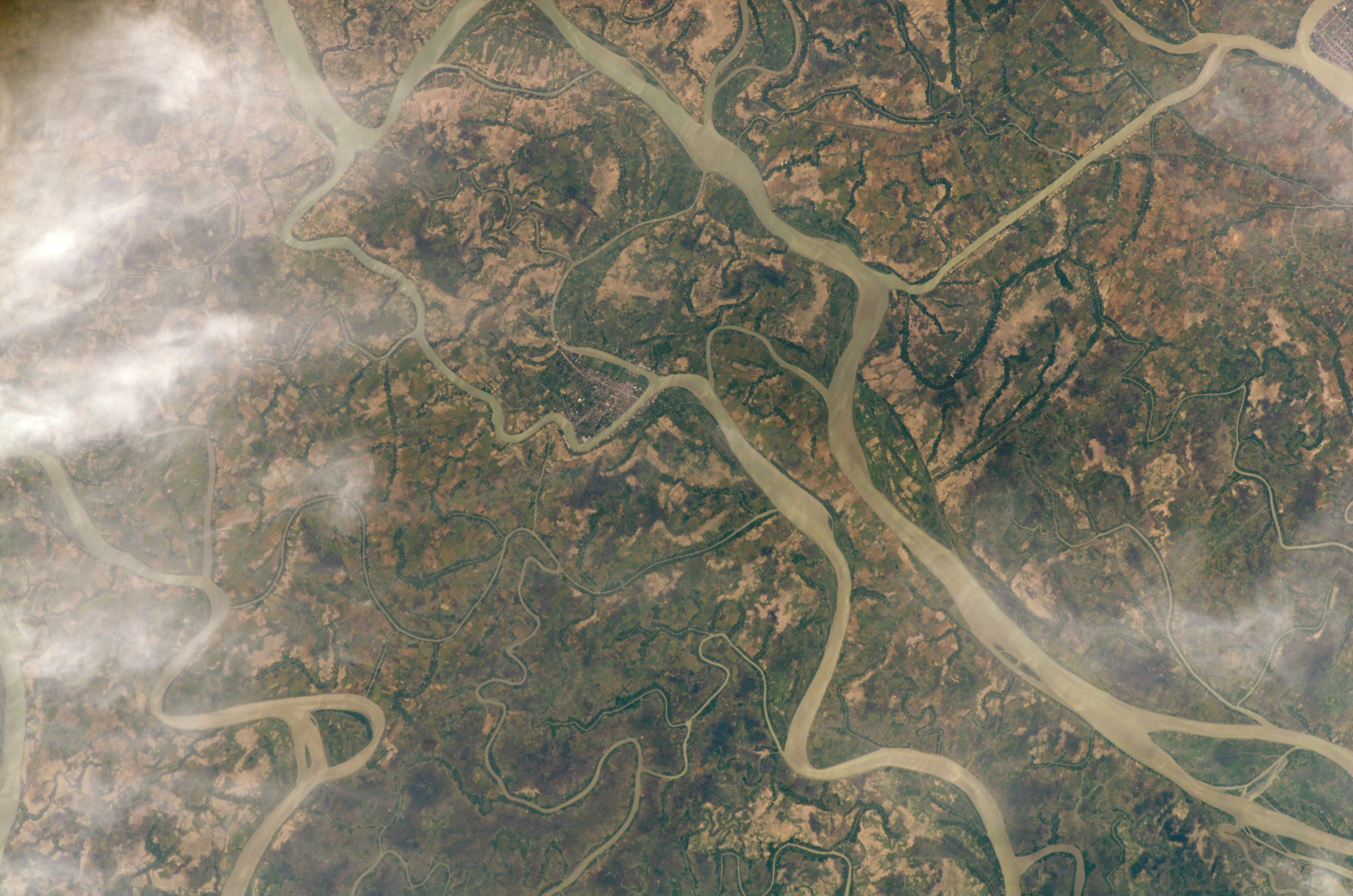
- View of the Mawlamyinegyun from the International Space Station
- Nickname: Mawgyun
- Interactive map of Mawlamyinegyun
- Coordinates: 16°23′N 95°16′E
- Country: Myanmar
- Region: Ayeyarwady Region
- District: Labutta District
- Township: Mawlamyinegyun Township

Area
  - Total: 2.12 sq mi (5.5 km^{2})

Population (2023)
  - Total: 34,107
  - Density: 16,100/sq mi (6,210/km^{2})
- Time zone: UTC+6.30 (MMT)
- Website: www.mawgyuncity.com

Mawlamyinegyun (Burmese: မော်လမြိုင်ကျွန်း; also spelt Moulmeingyun and known as Mawgyun), is a town in southern Ayeyarwady Region in south-west Myanmar. It is the seat of the Mawlamyinegyun Township in the Labutta District. The town is situated in the delta of the Irrawaddy River. The town lies at the confluence of the Razudai and Tonle Rivers and is subdivided into 13 urban wards.

== History ==
The town's name in Burmese literally translates as Mawlamyine Island The island's name comes from initial settlers finding a field of cosmos flowers, which in Burmese is called the mawlamyine flower, which is in turn named after the city of Mawlamyine.

The town was founded during the reign of Thibaw Min during the Konbaung Dynasty in 1878 as a logging settlement. The initial settlement had an area of 1.22 square miles (3.2 km^{2}) and was founded on the western bank of the main stream of the Irrawaddy River. However, after a tiger attack killed an elderly woman, the village chief U Saw Ke moved the village west to the Razudai River distributary on the western side of Mawlamyine Island. the town grew in prominence in the 1880s after the Third Anglo-Burmese War. It becoming a village under British rule in Burma in 1898 after which a township administrator by the name of Mr. Gray allotted residential lots using a lottery system. The village became a municipality in 1935 under the Town Committee's direction, expanding the borders of the town. In 1972, the Ministry of Home Affairs would designate it as a new town. It took until 2010 for all township administrative offices to be established in the town.

Prior to the formation of Labutta District, the town was in Myaungmya District in the Wakema Township. In 1962, the town had 17,641 people. According to the 2014 Myanmar census, the town had 32,915 people.

== In popular culture ==
It is the setting for Ma Ma Lay's 1955 novel, Not Out of Hate.
