= Pyinsalu Subtownship =

Subtownship in Ayeyarwady Region, Myanmar

Pyinsalu Subtownship ပြင်စလူမြို့နယ်ခွဲ
- Subtownship
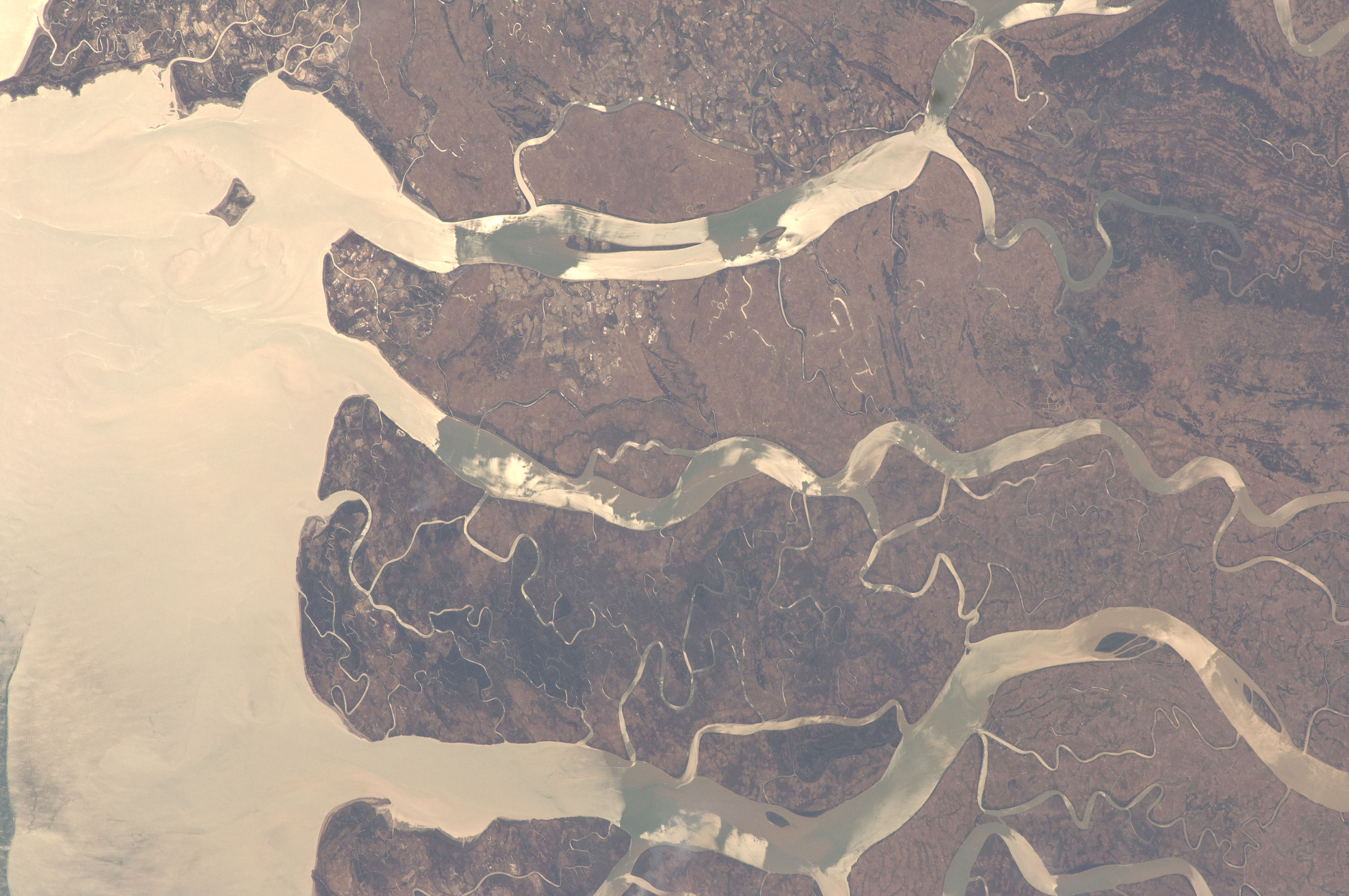
- View of western Pyinsalu subtownship from the International Space Station

- Location in Labutta district
- Coordinates: 15.93°N 94.88°E
- Country: Myanmar
- Region: Ayeyarwady Region
- District: Labutta District
- Township: Labutta Township
- Capital: Pyinsalu

Area
  - Total: 384.8 sq mi (996.6 km^{2})

Population (2014)
  - Total: 85,289
  - Density: 221.7/sq mi (85.58/km^{2})
- Time zone: UTC+6:30 (MMT)

Pyinsalu Subtownship (Burmese: ပြင်စလူမြို့နယ်ခွဲ) is a subtownship of Labutta Township in Labutta District, Ayeyarwady Region, Myanmar. The namesake of the subtownship is Pyinsalu, a small town of 2,484 people. The subtownship is coastal, bordering the Andaman Sea to its south. To its north, it borders the remainder of Labutta Township and, to its east, it borders Bogale Township and the mouth of the Irrawaddy River. The subtownship consists of 12 village tracts and one town, which is split into 3 urban wards.

The subtownship was severely affected by the 2008 Cyclone Nargis. Emergency response teams traveled by boat to reach the stranded communities on the patchwork of islands and rivers that make up the subtownship.

The subtownship also contains two protected coastal mangrove forests- the Pyan Alan and the Kyarkan Twinpauk forest reserves. These areas protect magrove species from the Rhizophora, Sonneratia and Avicennia genuses.
