= Labutta 3 Mile =

Labutta 3 Mile လပွတ္တာ (၃) မိုင်မြို့ Thonmai
- Town
- Interactive map of Labutta 3 Mile
- Coordinates: 16°11′59″N 94°46′40″E
- Country: Myanmar
- Region: Ayeyarwady Region
- District: Labutta
- Township: Labutta

Area
  - Total: 1.35 sq mi (3.5 km^{2})

Population (2023)
  - Total: 2,506
  - Density: 1,860/sq mi (717/km^{2})
- Time zone: UTC+6.30 (MST)

Labutta 3 Mile (Burmese: လပွတ္တာ (၃) မိုင်မြို့ [la̰pʊʔtà θóʊɰ̃ màɪ.mjo̰], also called Thonmai (Burmese: (၃) မိုင်မြို့, lit. 'three mile') is a town in the Ayeyarwady Region of south-west Myanmar. It was created in March 2016, as a new town three miles north from the existing township capital of Labutta through Legal Notification No.595/2016. Labutta 3 Mile lies on the western bank of the Yway River.

In 2019, the town had 2043 people. As of 2023, the town has 2,506 people.

The township has high schools for basic education as well as for specialised vocational skills in the industrial, agricultural and animal husbandry sectors.
