= Mingalar Parahita =

Orphanage in Phayargyi, Myanmar

Mingalar Parahita [မင်္ဂလာပရဟိတ] is an orphanage inside the compound of Phayargyi Mingalar Taik Monastery which is located in Phayargyi Village near Twante Township in Myanmar. It is also a Youth Development Center which is administrated by the local monastery. Many children arrived after cyclone Nargis, which devastated Myanmar's delta region in 2008, killing 140,000 and leaving tens of thousands of children orphaned or separated from their parents.

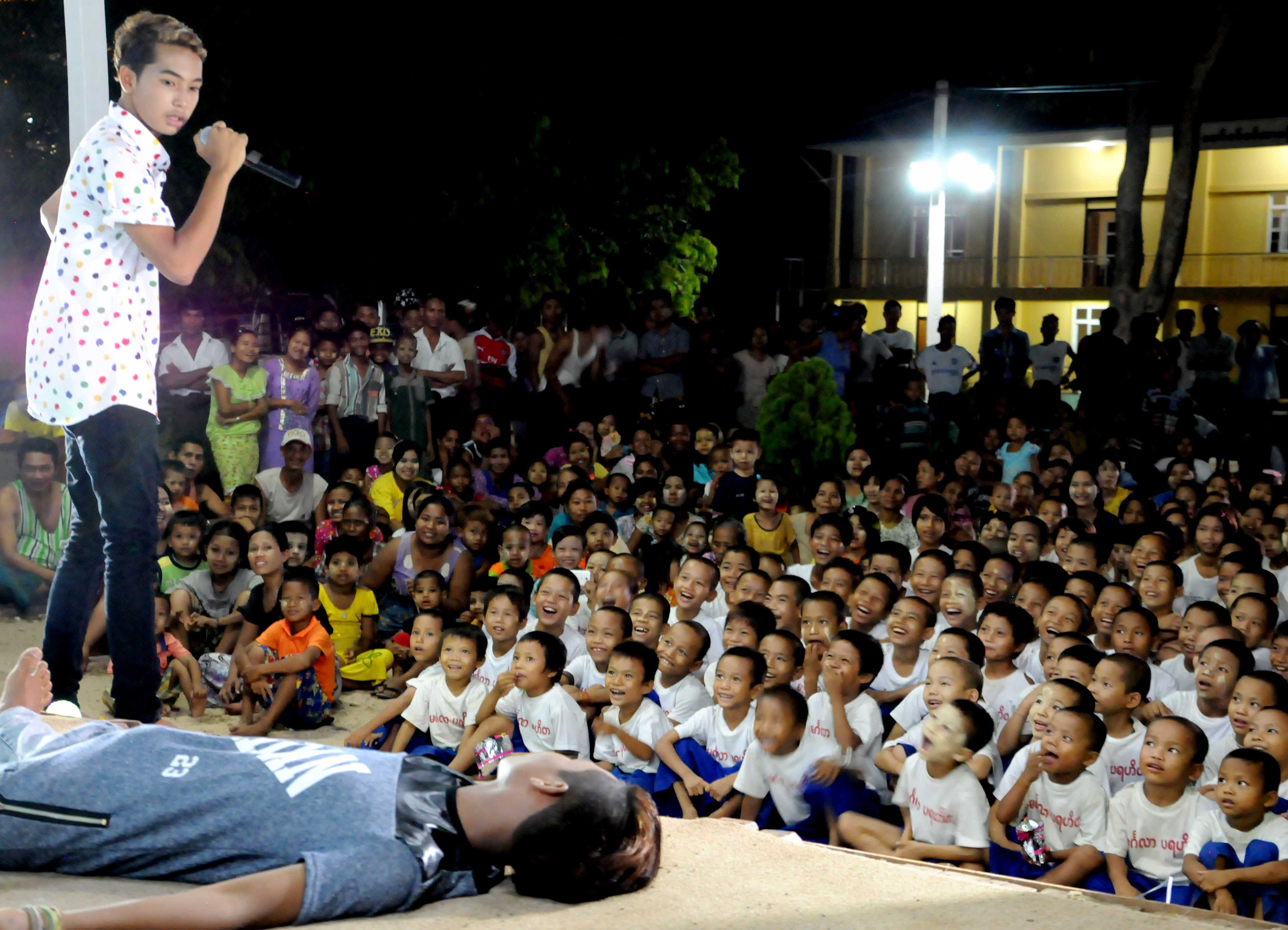
Children at Mingalar Parahita Orphanage during an Education Project

== History ==
Mingalar Parahita was founded by the late abbot of the Payargyi Village, Ven U Sandima. The orphanage started with 300 children in 2006 with donation from the local community. Later the orphanage grew into one of the largest orphanages in Myanmar. During the cyclone Nargis period in 2008, the orphanage was hit hard and a lot of buildings were damaged. Nowadays, the orphanage is home to around 2000 children.

== Donations ==
The orphanage has its main source of funding from local donors. There were many local and international charity organisations donating infrastructure, food, clothing and financial support. The orphanage faced many challenges during and after cyclone Nargis event such as fewer donations. There were some vocational trainings provided by some international donors such as The Mandalay Projects There were some other local donors who donate food on a regular basis. Some organisations provided vocational training or informal education.
