= Labutta =

Labutta လပွတ္တာမြို့ Laputta
- Town
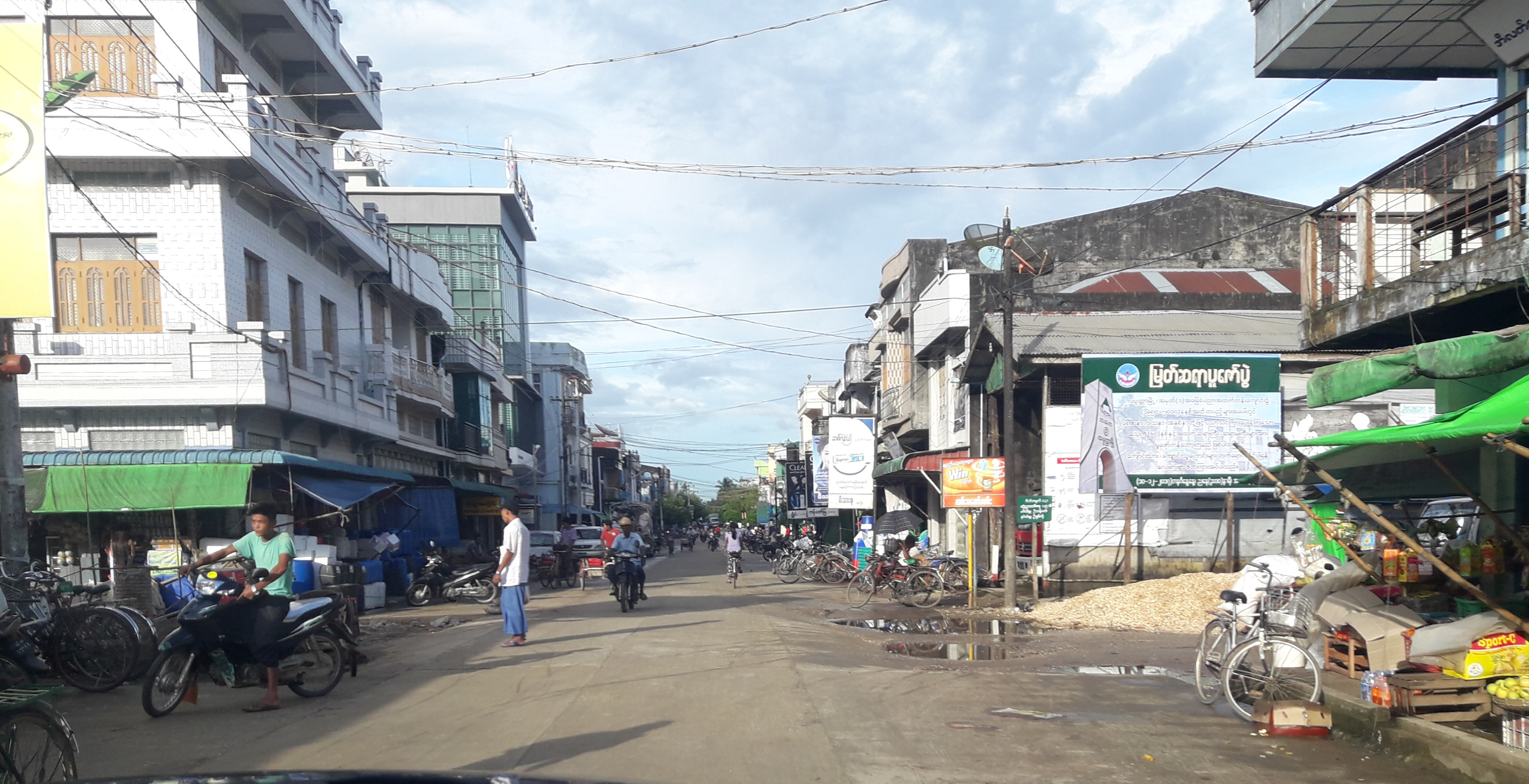
- Street in Laputta
- Interactive map of Labutta
- Coordinates: 16°08′48″N 94°45′40″E
- Country: Myanmar
- Region: Ayeyarwady Region
- District: Labutta
- Township: Labutta

Area
  - Total: 1.17 sq mi (3.0 km^{2})

Population (2023)
  - Total: 29,645
  - Density: 25,300/sq mi (9,780/km^{2})
- Time zone: UTC+6.30 (MST)
- Area code: 42

Labutta or Laputta (Burmese: လပွတ္တာမြို့, [la̰pʊʔtàmjo̰]) is a town in the Ayeyarwady Region of south-west Myanmar. It is the administrative seat of Labutta Township and the capital of Labutta District, Ayeyarwady Region. Labutta lies on the western bank of the Yway River. The town has 10 urban wards.

== History ==
The name Labutta comes from "Lapwat" in the Mon language, meaning a fork in the river, and "ta" referring to a toddy palm tree.

The town of Labutta was elevated to town status in 1917 during British Burma within Myaungmya District. In 1972, the Ministry of Home Affairs created Labutta Township.

In 2008, Labutta was heavily damaged by Cyclone Nargis.

In March 2016, the government founded Labutta 3 Mile as a new town three miles north of the existing town of Labutta through Legal Notification No.595/2016.
