= Mawlamyinegyun Township =

Mawlamyinegyun Township မော်လမြိုင်ကျွန်းမြို့နယ်
- Township
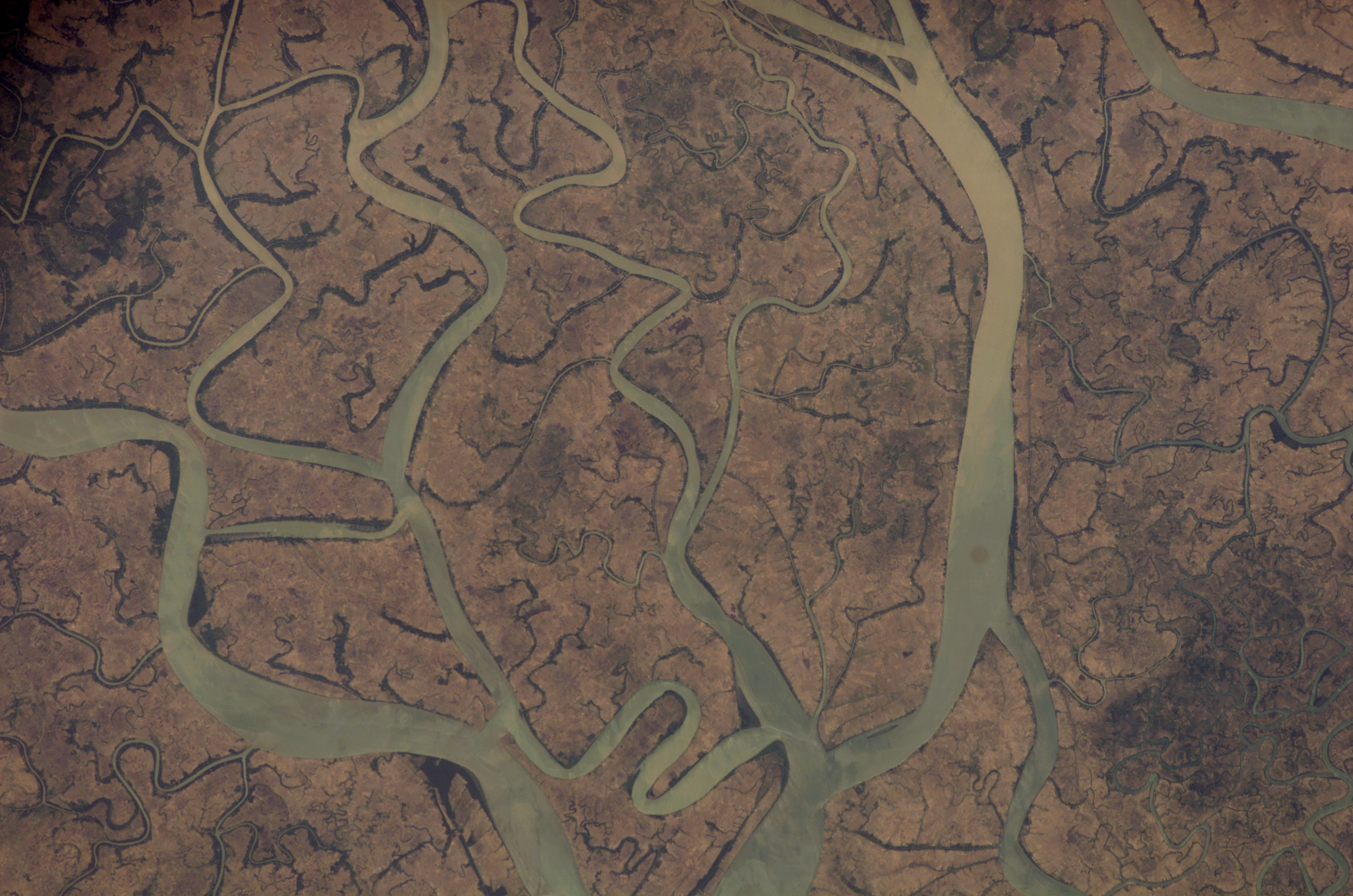
- View of southern Mawlamyinegyun Township from the International Space Station

- Location in Labutta district
- Coordinates: 16.3819°N 95.2592°E
- Country: Myanmar
- Region: Ayeyarwady Region
- District: Labutta District
- Capital: Mawlamyinegyun

Area
  - Total: 543.63 sq mi (1,408.0 km^{2})
- Elevation: 7.62 ft (2.32 m)

Population (2023)
  - Total: 310,991
  - Density: 572.06/sq mi (220.88/km^{2})
- Time zone: UTC+6:30 (MST)

Mawlamyinegyun Township (Burmese: မော်လမြိုင်ကျွန်းမြို့နယ်, also called Moulmeingyun Township) is a township of Labutta District in southern Ayeyarwady Region, Myanmar. The township is shortened colloquially as Mawkyun Township (Burmese: မော်ကျွန်းမြို့နယ်) The township has one town, the principal town of Mawlamyinegyun, which is divided into 13 urban wards. The remainder of the township is divided into 108 village tracts grouping together 676 villages. The township borders Wakema Township to the north and is bounded by the main stream channel of the Irrawaddy River to the east, separating it from Kyaiklat Township and Bogale Township. To its southwest, it borders Labutta Township

== History ==
The township's name in Burmese literally translates as Mawlamyine Island The island's name comes from initial settlers finding a field of cosmos flowers, which in Burmese is called the mawlamyine flower, which is in turn named after the city of Mawlamyine.

The town of Mawlamyinegyun was founded during the reign of Thibaw Min during the Konbaung Dynasty in 1878 as a logging settlement. The town grew in prominence in the 1880s after the Third Anglo-Burmese War. In 1972, the Ministry of Home Affairs would designate it as a new town. It took until 2010 for all township administrative offices to be established in the town. Prior to the formation of Labutta District, the township was part of Wakema Township in the Myaungmya District. The township was known for having the highest tier of rice production, with several mills in the mid 20th century.

The township was hit hard by Cyclone Nargis in 2008 and continues to suffer significant flooding, including saltwater intrusion into agricultural fields. The growing season is highly limited by flooding in the area. Social cohesion and religiosity has decreased since 2008 from the combined pressures of modernisation and continued natural disaster impact.

During the current Myanmar civil war, the township's People's Army leader was shot at and wounded by resistance forces on 8 November 2021. In 2024, officials demanded up to 1.5 million kyats from the family of those found to be avoiding conscription.

== Geography ==
The township lies in the south of the flat low-lying Irrawaddy Delta and has many waterways. The main Irrawaddy River forms its far eastern boundary with its other distributaries forming major rivers within the township including the Razudai, the Tonle, Sawke and Kwechan rivers. The township's only land border is to its southwest with Labutta Township, which still lies on a deltaic island.

The township has three protected forest reserves in the south protecting mangrove forests, covering 9.2% of the township's area. Overall, 84.7% of the township remains forested with plant species including nipa palms, Kyana and red mangroves. These habitats are home to various snakes, monitor lizards and wild boars.

== Demographics ==
Historical population
Year	Mawlamyinegyun Township	±%
1956	89,593	—
1973	179,111	+99.9%
1983	223,366	+24.7%
2014	311,340	+39.4%
2018	315,187	+1.2%
2019	325,424	+3.2%
2022	310,983	−4.4%
2023	310,991	+0.0%

The township is largely rural with 88.1% of the population in 2023 living outside the singular urban area of the town of Mawlamyinegyun. According to the 2014 Myanmar census, the township had a mean household size of 4.1 persons and a median age of 26.6 years. About 37% of the population relied on boats as their primarily means of transportation. The township only had an electrification rate of 5% and only 236 people relied on it as their main source of energy for cooking. However, 59.6% of households had at least one electronic item, usually a radio or television set. Additionally, only 76% of the population had access to either a water seal pit latrine or a flush toilet.

In 2019, the township had a 26.4% graduation rate from university. In 2022, the higher education rate had increased to 45.72% despite having no higher education institutions in the township. As of 2023, the township was 89.3% Bamar with 10.0% Karen people making up the largest minority. The predominant religion is Buddhism followed by 94.3% of the township with Christianity coming second at 4.6% of the population.

== Economy ==
Labutta Township is described as a developing economy. Its primary industry is agriculture with rice being, by far, its main crop with black matpe as a secondary crop. In the winter, the township also grows a significant amount of green beans. There are no dedicated animal husbandry zones, but both chickens and ducks are also raised in the township. The manufacutring sector is small with some textiles, goldsmithing and food processing workshops and factories located in the town. There is also a significant nipa palm farming industry, which is used as a primary construction material for 69-73% of the housing stock in the township.

The organic and irregular elevation of rice paddy fields in the township is a leading barrier to more efficient rice-farming techniques such as Alternate Wet Drying. Although the township is not as affected by salinity relative to neighbouring townships, the township still experiences a significant yield gap in its rice output.

Being located on deltaic islands, the township primarily relies on waterways for transport of goods and people. The township is connected to the country's road network by the Razudai Bridge spanning over the Irrawaddy River from the town of Mawlamyinegyun heading east into Bogale Township and towards Yangon. The only air transport hub in the township is the heliport for the Light Infantry Division 534 military base.

== List of Village Tracts ==
The following are Mawlamyinegyun Township's 108 village tracts in the township, which group together 730 villages recognised by the Myanmar Information Management Unit as of 2024.

- Ah Htet Ma Au Htone
- Ah Lel Yae Kyaw
- Auk Ma Au Htone
- Aung Hlaing
- Ba Maw
- Bagan Pon
- Boe Ti Lut
- Bone Gyi Kone
- Byant Gyi Myit Kyoe
- Byant Gyi Ohn Pin Su
- Da Lin Hle Seik
- Da None Seik
- Dun Ta Peit
- Ga Yan
- Gon Hnyin Tan
- Gway Kone
- Hlaing Bone
- Hman Ku
- Hpa Yar Chaung Ta Khun Taing
- Hpa Yar Daunt
- Hpa Yar Gyi Kone
- Hpoe Kha Hmi Daunt
- Hpoe Thar Aye Ah Su
- Hpu Hti
- Hpyar Leik
- Htein Ku Lar
- Hti Par Lel
- Hti Par Lel Thaung Tan
- Hti Seik Hpa Yar Su
- Hti Seik Ywar Ma
- Hti To Lo
- Hti Yar Li
- Htu Taw Ka Mya
- Ka Zaung
- Kan Kone
- Kan Zauk
- Kat Kho
- Kat Tha Hmyin Hti Seik Yae Kyaw
- Kun Chan Kone
- Kyaik Pi
- Kyar Chaung
- Kyar Hone
- Kyat Sin Chaung
- Kyaw Zan
- Kyet Shar
- Kyon La Mu
- Kyon La Tar Kyaung Su
- Kyun Chaung
- Kyun Deik
- Kyun Gyi
- Kyun Ka Lay
- Kyun Khei Ma
- Kywe Chan Chaung Hpyar
- Kywe Chan Kyon La Mu
- Kywe Chan Wa
- Kywe Chan Yae Kyaw
- Kywe Da Lin
- La Put Kwe None Tan
- La Put Kwe Te Chaung
- Lat Put Ta Loke Gyi
- Lat Put Ta Loke Ka Lay
- Lay Ein Tan
- Lin Zwe Me Za Li
- Ma Bay
- Ma Hmway Kyun
- Ma Yan
- Ma Ye Ohn Pin Su
- Me Za Li Ka Zan Chaung
- Me Za Li Pathein Su
- Me Za Li U To
- Mei Ta Laing
- Meik Tha Lin Kone
- Myat Thar U To
- Myat Thar Wa
- Myat Thar Ywar Ma
- Myat Thar Zee Hpyu
- Myin Ka Kone Ka Lay/ Daung Yae Kyaw
- Myit Gyi Boe
- Nat Hmu
- None Kyun
- Nwar Yae Kyaw Kyaung Su
- Nwar Yae Kyaw Nyaung Lan
- Nyaungdon Su
- Peik Tar
- Pet Pye
- Pu Lun Sar
- Pyar Mut Shaw Chaung
- Sa Khan Gyi
- Saw Ke Chaung
- See Pwar Chaung
- Shauk Chaung
- Sin Chaung
- Sit Sa Li Htone
- Ta Khun Taing Kyon War
- Tat Ngu
- Tei Chaung
- Tha Khut Kone War Yon Daunt
- Tha Pyay Chaung
- Thit To Seik
- Thone Gwa
- Thone Gwa Chun
- Thu Ye Chaung
- War Net Chaung
- War Rakhine
- Wea Daunt
- Wet Kwin
- Yae Lein
- Yae Twin Kone
- Yar Zu Taing Ka Nyin Chaung
