= Labutta Township =

Labutta Township လပွတ္တာမြို့နယ်
- Township
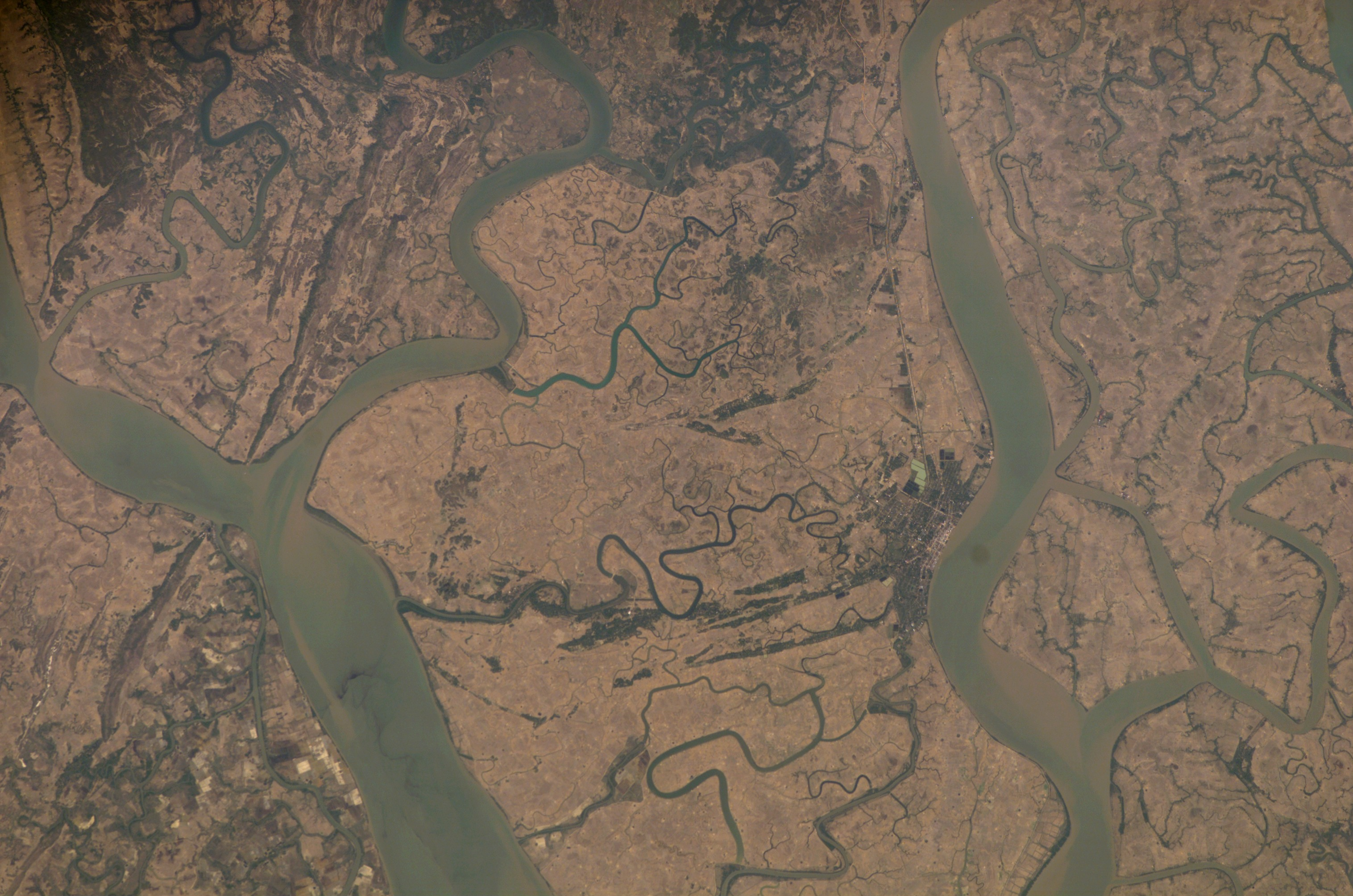
- View of eastern Labutta Township from the International Space Station

- Location in Labutta district
- Coordinates: 16°06′N 94°52′E
- Country: Myanmar
- Region: Ayeyarwady Region
- District: Labutta District
- Capital: Labutta

Area
  - Total: 1,101.76 sq mi (2,853.5 km^{2})
- Elevation: 5 ft (1.5 m)

Population (2023)
  - Total: 308,796
  - Density: 280.275/sq mi (108.215/km^{2})
- Time zone: UTC+6:30 (MMT)

Labutta Township or Laputta Township (Burmese: လပွတ္တာမြို့နယ်) is one of the two townships in Labutta District in southern Ayeyarwady Region in lower Myanmar. It is located in the Irrawaddy Delta and suffered many casualties from Cyclone Nargis in 2008. The principal town is Labutta and the township has one subtownship - Pyinsalu Subtownship.

To its west it borders Pathein District's Ngapudaw Township. To its north it borders the two Myaungmya District townships of Myaungmya and Wakema Township. To its east, it borders the other Labutta District township of Mawlamyinegyun Township as well as Bogale Township of Pyapon District. To its south is the coast of the Andaman Sea.

== History ==
The name Labutta comes from "Lapwat" in the Mon language meaning a fork in the river, and "ta" referring to a toddy palm tree.

The town of Labutta was elevated to town status in 1917 during British Burma within Myaungmya District. In 1972, the Ministry of Home Affairs created Labutta Township. In 2004, Pyinsalu town and subtownship were established. The township's boundaries were adjusted on 5 August 2009. In 2008, the township had 115 village tracts comprising 684 villages.

84,454 people from this township were listed as dead or missing as a result of the devastating Cyclone Nargis in 2008. As a result, there was a worldwide effort to rehabilitate the villages and towns of Labutta severely affected by the cyclone.

In March 2016, the government founded Labutta 3 Mile as a new town three miles from the existing town of Labutta through Legal Notification No.595/2016.

== Geography ==
The township has three towns- the principal town of Labutta as well as Pyinsalu and Labutta 3 Mile (also romanised as Thonmai). In total, the three towns have 17 urban wards. Pyinsalu forms the administrative center for Pyinsalu Subtownship, an informal subdivision of Labutta Township used for statistical and administrative purposes. As of 2023, there were 65 village tracts in Labutta Township comprising 505 villages.

The township is located in the southern Irrawaddy Delta and has many waterways. The main Irrawaddy River forms its far eastern boundary with its other distributaries forming major rivers within the township including the Thakketaung, Yway, Pyamalawt and Pyinsalu Rivers. The town of Labutta lies in the western part of the township located on the western bank of the Yway River. These major rivers form waterways for transport and is the primary means of transportation within the township. However, the township's waterways also give it one of the highest exposures to flooding in the Irrawaddy Delta. Up to 57% of the township's area is exposed to flooding.

The township's environment is deltaic with flat topography and a few hills in the north of the township. The sediments of the environment support high ecological productivity, but its resilience has been impacted significantly be decades of deforestation, especially towards it mangrove forests. Saline intrusion and seasonal flooding are significant hazards to the population, especially since the township has limited disaster relief services. 10.03% of the township's area is protected by the Pyan Alan and the Kyarkan Twinpauk forest reserves protecting coastal mangrove forests with species from the Rhizophora, Sonneratia and Avicennia genuses. A further 12% of the township outside these reserves remains forested with trees including jackfruit, crepe-myrtle and date palms. The township is home to various fauna including rabbits, foxes and wild boars.

== Demographics ==
Historical population
Year	Labutta Township	±%
1973	173,707	—
1983	238,516	+37.3%
2014	298,637	+25.2%
2018	332,298	+11.3%
2019	332,360	+0.0%
2022	313,522	−5.7%
2023	308,796	−1.5%

Labutta Township is largely rural with 88.8% of the population living outside of an urban area. In 2019, the township had its highest population with 332,360 people. By 2023, the population had decreased to 308,796 people. The majority religion is Buddhism with 84.3% of the population adhering to it. Christianity is the second highest with 8.25% of the population as of 2023.

According to the 2014 Myanmar census, 229,929 people lived in the portion of Labutta Township outside of the Pyinsalu subtownship. The median age of this area was 25.6 years with the average household having 4.1 persons. The electrification rater of that area was low with only 10% of households using electricity as their primary form of lighting. The census also showed an uneven distribution in the township's population pyramid, with the effects of Cyclone Nargis visible in the township having less people than expected in the 15-24 agea range.

== Economy ==
Labutta Township is described as a developing economy. Its primary industry is agriculture with rice being, by far, its main crop. In the winter, the township also grows a significant amount of green beans and peanuts. Smallholder farms and mills lack the ability to finance fertilisers, seeds and mechanised drying. In particular, the rice husk byproduct from mills is used mostly as traditional biomass through local networks with limited opportunities to effectively collect and transport rice husk into an export industry. 72% of the total population relies on either agriculture of fisheries with limited opportunities for corporate or collective association. Furthermore, the township has a lack of vocational training opportunities, furthering the impact of its non-diversified livelihoods. The township faces significant risks relating to market failures, especially for its fishing industry due to an abundance of sellers and few buyers.

Coconuts and nipa palm farming is also significant, with the later being used as a primary construction material for 77-84% of the housing stock in the township.

== List of Village Tracts ==
The following are Labutta Township's 102 village tracts in the township, which group together 582 villages recognised by the Myanmar Information Management Unit as of 2024.

- Ah Htet Pyun
- Ah Mat
- Baing Daunt Chuang
- Bar Thar Kone
- Bay Pauk
- Bi Tut
- Boe Pyayt
- Bone Gyi Kone
- Chaung Wa
- Da Ni Seik
- Daunt Gyi
- Dee Du Kone
- Gant Eik
- Gon Hnyin Tan
- Gway Chaung
- Hlaing Bone
- Hlwa Zar
- Hnget Pauk
- Hpa Yar Hla
- Hpaung Doe
- Htin Pon Kwin
- Ka Ka Yan
- Ka Nyin Chaung
- Ka Nyin Kaing
- Ka Nyin Kone
- Ka Nyin Ngu
- Ka Tha Paung
- Kaing Thuang
- Kan Bet
- Kan Chaing
- Kan Chaung
- Kant Ba Lar
- Koe Htaung
- Koke Ko
- Kone Gyi
- Kone Tan
- Kyar Kan
- Kyauk Chaung
- Kyauk Hmaw
- Kyauk Hpyu Pein Hne Taung
- Kyauk Ta Gar
- Kyauk Tan Gyi
- Kyauk Tan Ka Lay
- Kyee Chuang
- Kyein Kone Gyi
- Kyein Kwin
- Kyon Ku
- Kyu Taw
- La Put Pyay Le Pyauk
- Laputta Loke (North)
- Laputta Loke (South)
- Ma Yan Kwin
- Maung Di
- Maung Nge
- Me Kha Ye
- Min Bu Su
- Mway Hauk
- Myit Pauk
- Myo Thit
- Na Gone
- Nga Pyay Ma
- Nyan Kwin
- Nyaung Chaung
- Nyaung Lan
- Nyaung Lein
- Nyaung Waing
- Ohn Ta Pin
- Oke Twin
- Pan Tone Kwin
- Poe Laung
- Pyin Kha Yaing
- Sa Lu Seik
- San Gyi
- Sar Chet
- Sar Kyin
- Shaw Chaung
- Sin Chay Yar
- Tat Kwin
- Tei Pin Taing
- Tha Nat Hpet
- Tha Pyay Chuang
- Tha Pyu Kone
- Tha Yet Kone Le Pyauk
- Tha Zin Kyun
- Thar Li Kar Kone
- Thea Kone Gyi
- Thet Kei Thaung
- Thin Gan Gyi
- Thin Gan Kone
- Thit Poke
- Thit Poke Teik
- Thone Gwa
- Tu Myaung
- War Kone
- Yae Kyaw Auk
- Yae Saing
- Yae Twin Seik
- Ye Khaung Gyi
- Yway
- Zee Chaing
- Zee Hpyu Seik
