= Bánh bó =

Vietnam Snack

Bánh bó (lit. 'packed cake') is a pressed fruit cake from Quảng Ngãi Province, Vietnam. It is also called bánh bó mứt - a pressed mochi cake with candied fruit.

It is to be distinguished from bánh bò (lit. 'cow cake', but without meat) a chewy sponge cake. This also exists as a spongy fruit cake: bánh bò mứt (bánh măng).
