= White sugar sponge cake =

Chinese pastry

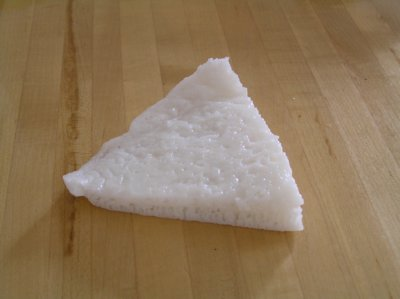
- Alternative names: White sugar cake, white sugar pastry
- Type: Cake
- Place of origin: Foshan, China
- Main ingredients: Rice flour, sugar, leavening agent
- Similar dishes: Htanthi mont, fa gao, sanna

White sugar sponge cake
- Chinese: 白糖糕
- Hanyu Pinyin: bái táng gāo
- Jyutping: baak6 tong4 gou1
- Literal meaning: white sugar cake
Transcriptions
Standard Mandarin
- Hanyu Pinyin: bái táng gāo
Gan
- Romanization: pak7 tong2 gau1
Yue: Cantonese
- Yale Romanization: baahk tòng gōu
- Jyutping: baak6 tong4 gou1
- IPA: [pak̚˨tʰɔŋ˩kɔw˥]

White sugar sponge cake (also called white sugar cake and white sugar pastry) is a type of Chinese pastry.

It is made from rice flour, white sugar, water, and a leavening agent.

Although called a "cake", it is not circular. It is usually purchased as an individual square piece or a small triangle. The cake is white, spongy, and soft. The taste is sweet and sometimes slightly sour due to fermentation of the batter prior to cooking. Like most Chinese cakes it is steamed, which makes it moist, soft, and fluffy. If left exposed to the air, it hardens quickly. It is usually kept under some cover to preserve moistness. It is typically served hot, because when it is cold it is not as soft and moist. The batter is either poured into a bowl in a steamer, a Chinese steamer cloth or aluminum foil. If made from brown rice flour and brown sugar it is called a brown sugar sponge cake.

== Names ==
The cake has a variety of regional names, including:

- Baak tong gou (Cantonese)
- Bai tang gao (Mandarin)
- Pak thong koh (Malay)
- Puting asukal bibingka (Filipino)

== See also ==
- Idli
- Jiuniang
- List of steamed foods
