= Bánh bò =

Vietnamese rice flour-based sponge cake

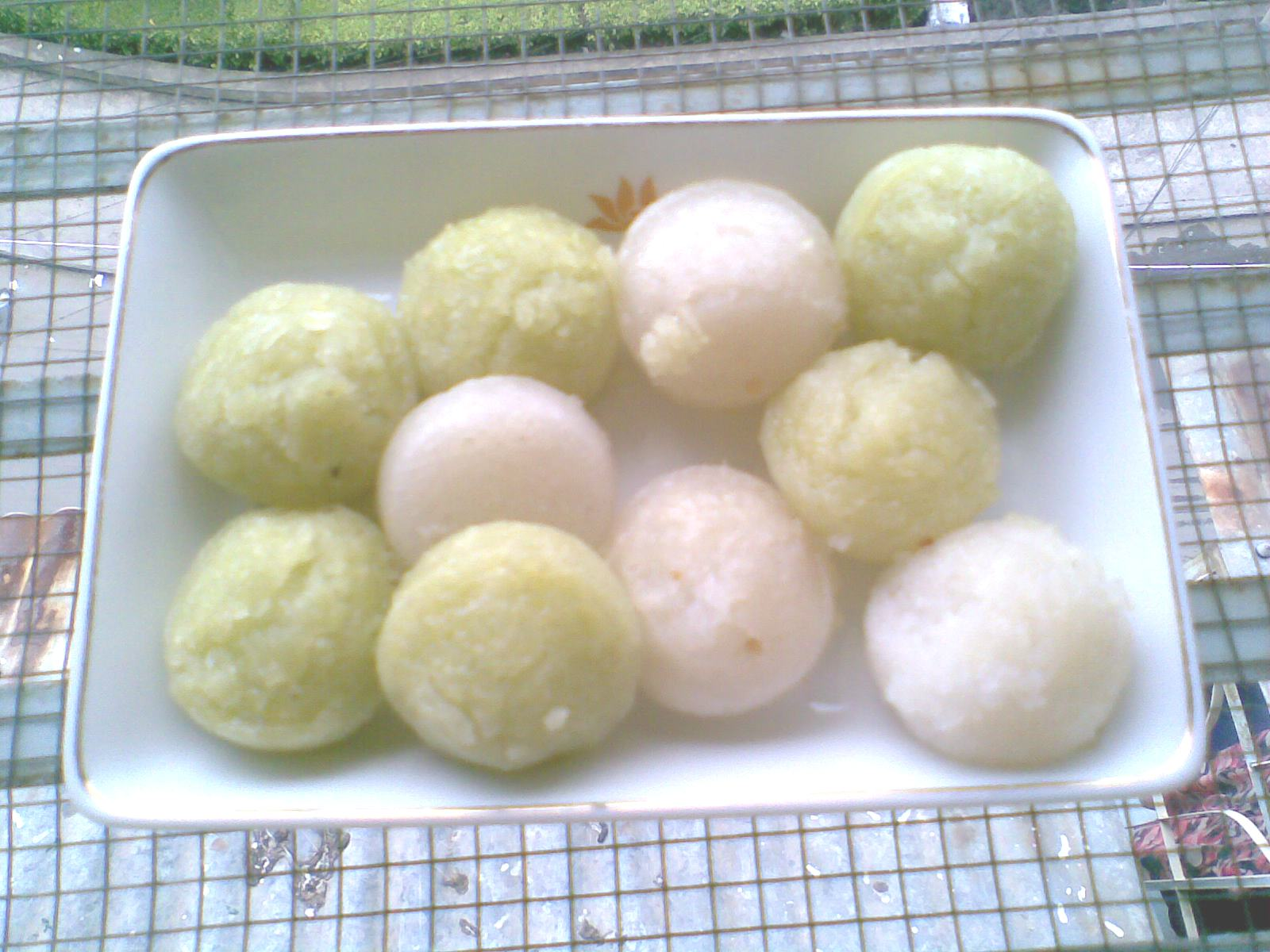
- Bánh bò hấp (steamed bánh bò)
- Type: Sponge cake
- Course: Dessert
- Place of origin: Vietnam
- Region or state: Southeast Asia
- Main ingredients: Rice flour, water, sugar, yeast, coconut milk
- Similar dishes: Htanthi mont, Fa gao

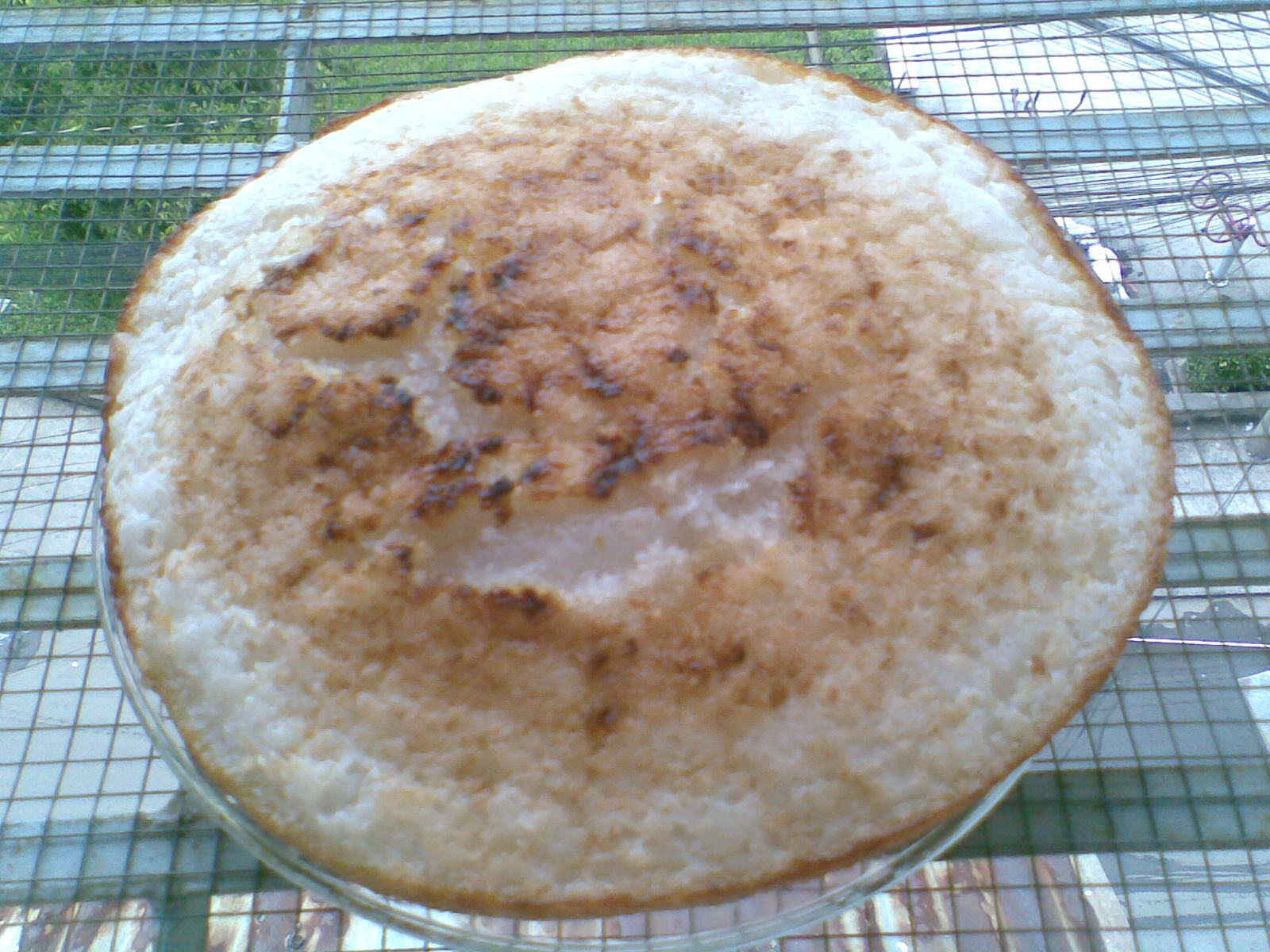
Bánh bò nướng (baked bánh bò)

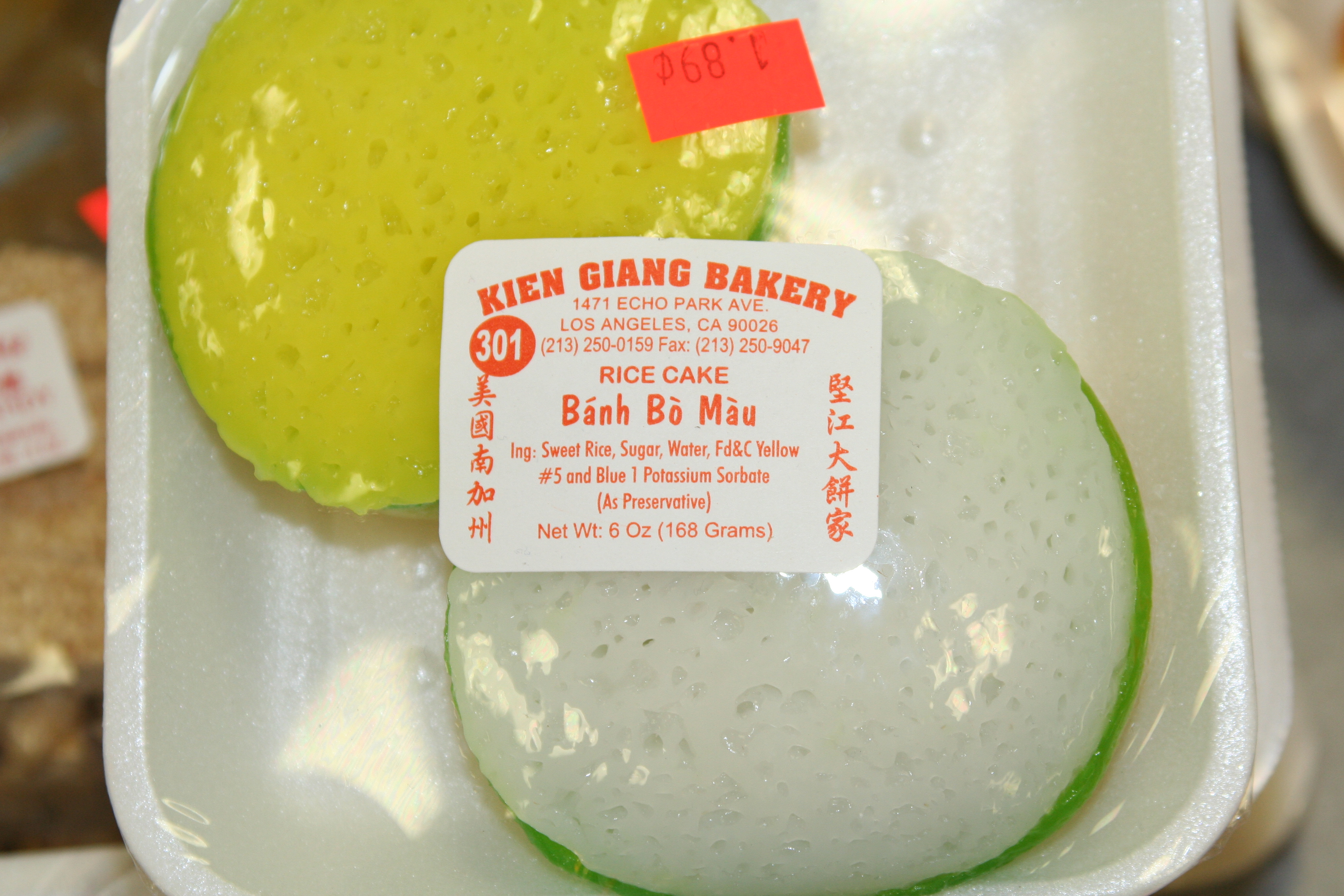
Bánh bò màu (màu = colored)

Bánh bò (literally "cow cake" or "crawl cake") is a sweet, chewy sponge cake from Vietnam. It is made from rice flour, water, sugar, and yeast, and has a honeycomb-like appearance (called rễ tre, literally "bamboo roots," in Vietnamese) on the inside due to the presence of numerous small air bubbles. Coconut milk is also usually a part of the batter, imparting a slight flavor and aroma of coconut.

== Etymology ==
In the Vietnamese language, bánh means "cake", and bò can either mean "cow" or "to crawl". According to the entry for "𤙭" (bò) in Paulus Huỳnh Tịnh Của's 1895 dictionary Đại Nam quấc âm tự vị, the dessert is named for its resemblance to a cow's udder, implying that the name was shortened from bánh vú bò. However, according to a popular folk etymology, bò refers to how the cake "crawls" up to the rim of the bowl when steamed to completion.

Bánh bò is to be distinguished from the less common bánh bó ("pressed cake"), a fruit cake found in Quảng Ngãi Province; bò ("cow", "beef") is pronounced with a falling tone, whereas bó ("pressed") has a rising tone.

== Varieties ==
Traditional varieties of bánh bò are available in Vietnam as well as in Asian grocery stores in countries with substantial overseas Vietnamese populations, such as the United States and France:

- Bánh bò nướng (lit. 'baked bánh bò') – This variety of bánh bò is cooked by baking in a pan in an oven. It is generally off-white or yellowish-white in color on the inside and golden on the outside by caramelized coconut milk. Individual cakes are often large in size, in which case a serving will consist of a slice rather than the whole cake.
- Bánh bò hấp (lit. 'steamed bánh bò') is similar in appearance to the baked version. These cakes are often small in size, ball-shaped and cooked from the liquid. Bánh bò hấp may be white in color, green (by Pandanus amaryllifolius extract), pink or pale purple (by magenta plant extract). There are three ways to serve this variety. Like bánh bò nướng, it can be used alone. Also, people enjoy them in a small dish with coconut milk sauce including tapioca starch on top and a little bit muối mè or muối đậu phộng (literally: sesame salt and peanut salt, respectively).

== See also ==
- Idli
- Bika ambon
