= Sugar palm =

Sugar palm is a common name for several species of palms used to produce sugar.

Species used include:

- Arenga pinnata (syn. A. saccharifera)
- Borassus flabellifer
- Caryota

- Caryota urens

- Cocos nucifera

== See also ==
- Toddy palm
- Palm sugar
- Media related to Sugar palms at Wikimedia Commons
