= Palm fruit juice =

Juice from palm Kernel after boiling and pounding

Palm fruit juice or Tal er Rosh, (Bengali: তালের রস) is sweet sap extracted from the fruit of palm trees in summer. It contains vitamins A, B, C, and the elements zinc, calcium, potassium, and iron. It also contains antioxidants. This is a symbolic and well-known food in Bengal in the summer. Numbers of popular Bengali foods are made using this palm fruit juice such as palm candy, pitha, pays, kheer, and taller boora (Bengali: তালের বড়া).

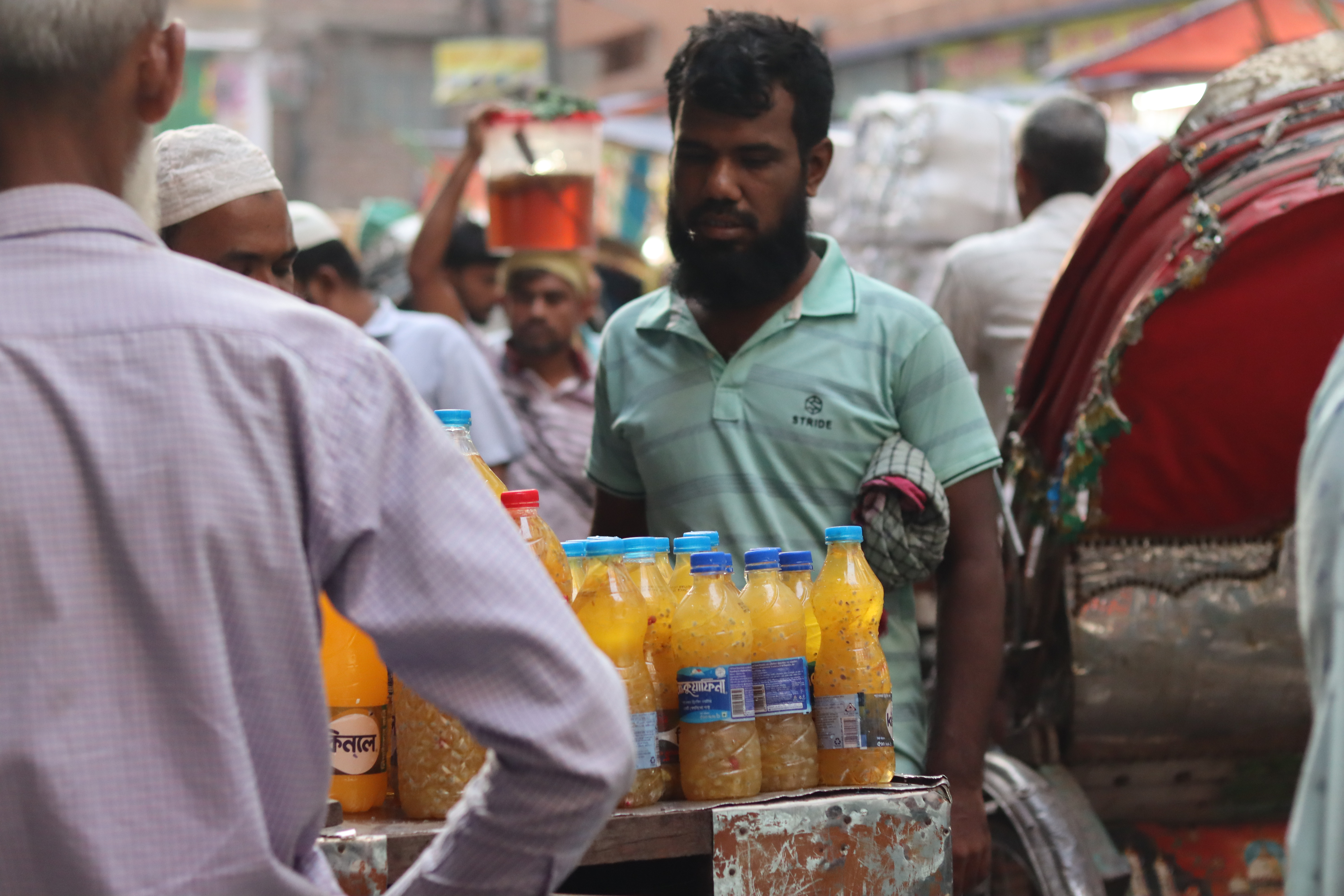
Juice seller at Chowk Bazar Iftar Market

== Age and quality ==
Only the female palm tree gives the fruits. The age of the tree to starting to give fruits is normally 12 to 13 years. The taste of palm juice or pulp is mainly two types, bitter or sweet. The bitterness or sweetness of the juice depends on the soil and climate. The sweet palm juice is mainly used in traditional foods.

== Extraction of pulp from ripe fruit ==
Conventionally, the seeds of the unripe palm are eaten. But ripe palm is also used in various ways. Sweet ripe palm is used to extract pulp for food purposes. Skin of the fruit is removed. The whole fruit is de-seeded. Manually or mechanically, the juice is extracted from each of the de-seeded parts. This extracted juice is reserved in a container for further use.

== Popular foods ==
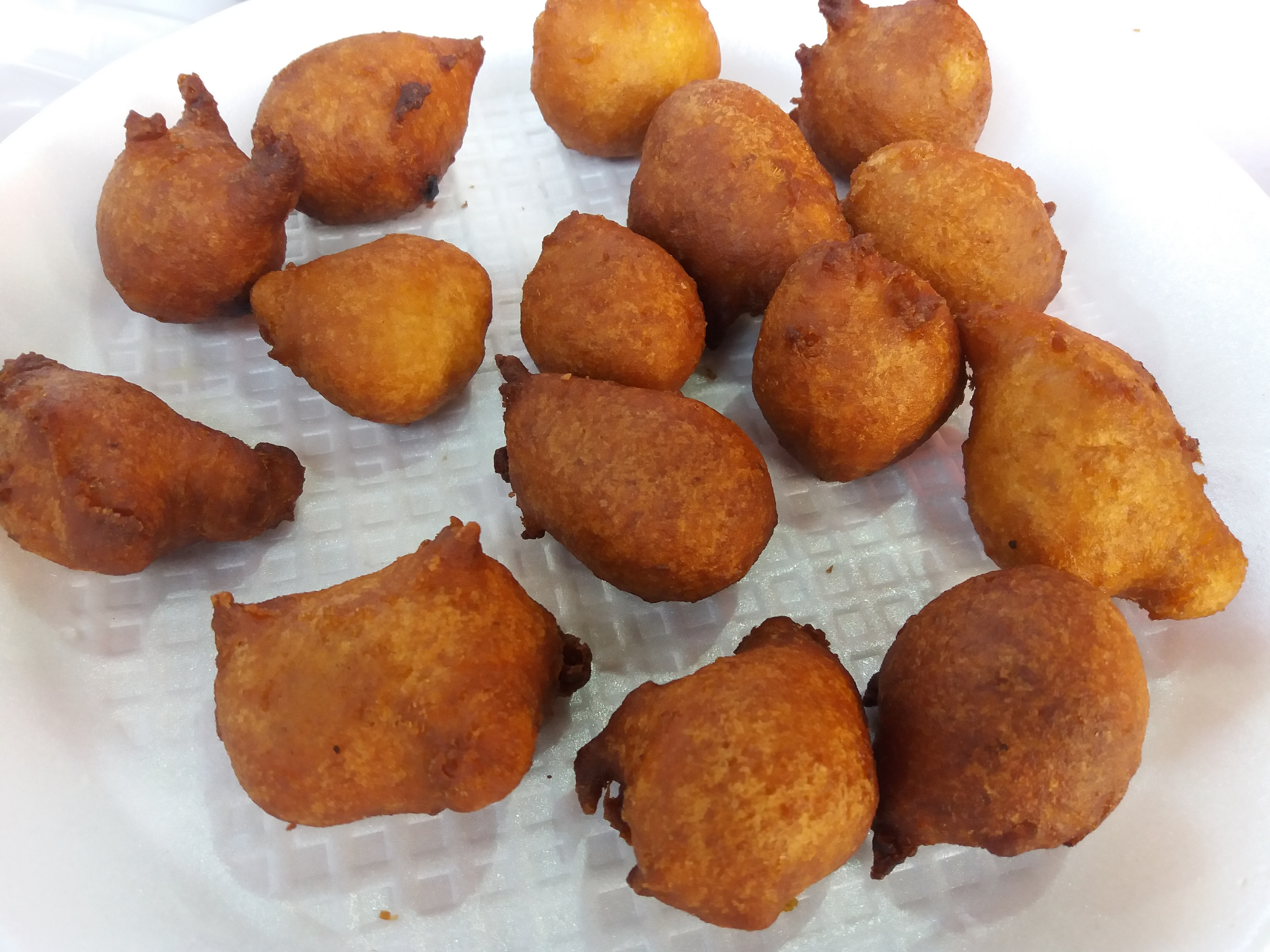
Most famous food of Palm Juice: Taller bora (তালের বড়া)

Conventionally, the whole fruit of palm is eaten, though this food is ripe or unripe. But the Bengali people make the various dishes using the pulp or juice of ripe palm fruit. These include:

- Taller bora (Bengali: তালের বড়া)
- Pitha
- Taller kheer
- Palm candy
- Pays (পায়েস)
- Powder
- Cake
- Jam
- Jaggery
- Jelly
