= Fa gao =

Chinese steamed cake

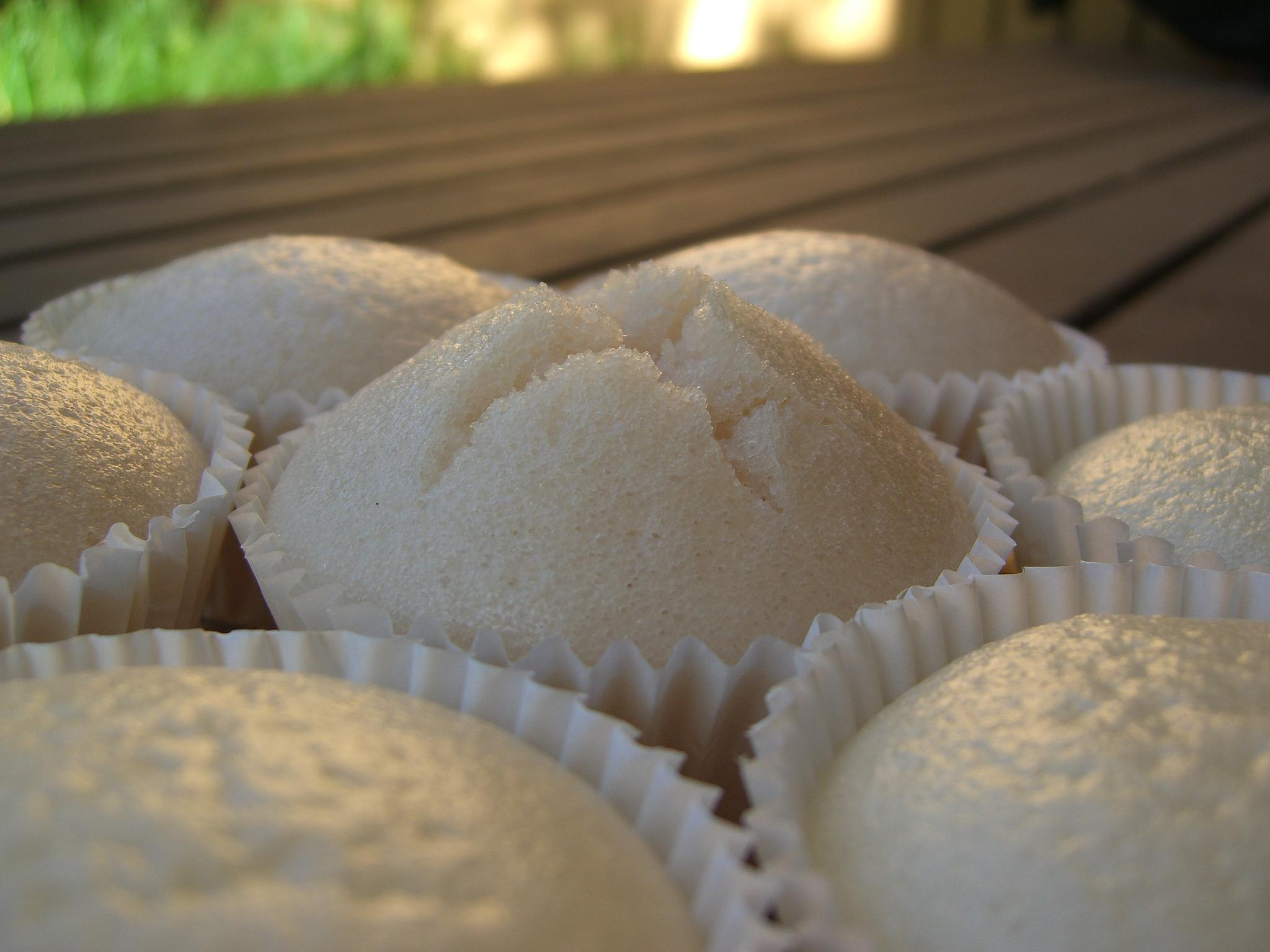
- Type: Dessert
- Place of origin: China
- Main ingredients: flour (usually rice flour), leavening (traditionally yeast), sugar
- Similar dishes: Htanthi mont, Bánh bò, Kue mangkok

Fa gao
- Traditional Chinese: 發糕
- Simplified Chinese: 发糕
Transcriptions
Standard Mandarin
- Hanyu Pinyin: fāgāo
Yue: Cantonese
- Yale Romanization: faatgōu
- Jyutping: faat3 gou1

Alternative Chinese name
- Traditional Chinese: 發粿
Transcriptions
Southern Min
- Hokkien POJ: hoat-ké / hoat-koé / hoat-kér

Second alternative Chinese name
- Traditional Chinese: 發粄
Transcriptions
Hakka
- Romanization: fat pan

Fa gao (traditional Chinese: 發糕; simplified Chinese: 发糕; pinyin: fāgāo; Cantonese Yale: faatgōu; Pe̍h-ōe-jī: hoat-koé), also called fat pan (發粄) by the Hakka, prosperity cake, fortune cake, Cantonese sponge cake, is a Chinese steamed, cupcake-like dessert. Because it is often characterized by a split top when cooked, it is often referred as Chinese smiling steamed cake or blooming flowers. It is commonly consumed on the Chinese new year. It is also eaten on other festivals, wedding, and funerals by the Hakka people.

== Symbolism ==
The name of cake, fagao, is a homonym for "cake which expands" and "prosperity cake" as "fa" means both "prosperity" and "expand" and "gao" means "cake".

The Hakka call the "top split" of the fa ban "xiao", which means smiling. It is said to be a sign of a coming fortune: the bigger the "top split", the better.

== Preparation ==
The cake is made of flour (usually rice flour), leavening (traditionally yeast, but can be chemical leavening), sugar or another sweetener; it is then steamed (instead of baked) on high heat until the top splits into a characteristic "split top" of four segments, or sometimes 3 sections. The batter is typically left to rest for fermentation prior to being steam-cooked.

These cakes, when used to encourage prosperity in the new year, are often dyed bright colours. The most common colours traditionally are white and pink, but it can also be turned brown by adding palm sugar.

== Influences in Asia ==
=== Singapore ===
Chinese Singaporeans use fa gao as offerings during ancestral worship.

=== Thailand ===
In Thailand, this type of cake is called Khanom thuai fu (Thai: ขนมถ้วยฟู, pronounced [kʰā.nǒm tʰûaj fuː˧]), which translates to "fluffy snack in a cup". It is one of nine auspicious Thai desserts, because its name has an auspicious meaning, conveying prosperity or progress.

== Influences outside Asia ==
=== Mauritius and Reunion island ===
In Mauritius, the fa gao is known as "poutou chinois" (lit. 'Chinese puttu') or "poutou rouge" (lit. 'red puttu' in French). It is called "pot pan" (發粄/发粄; fa ban) by the Mauritians of Hakka descent, and by Reunionese people of Hakka descent. Fa gao in Mauritius and Reunion is typically pink in colour, and it is eaten on Chinese New Year. However, it is actually sold and eaten all year long.

== Gallery ==
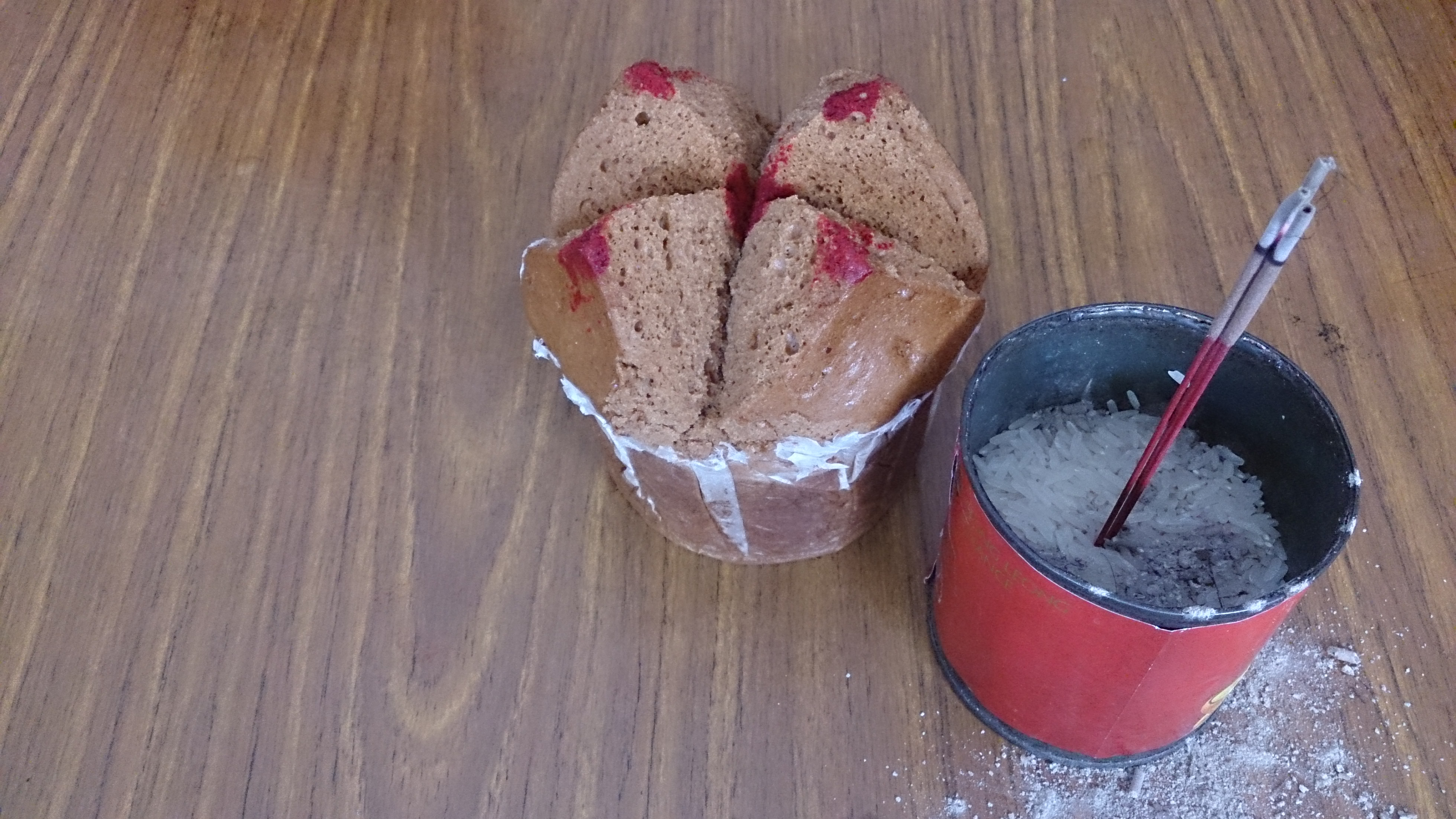
Incense stick and fa gao.

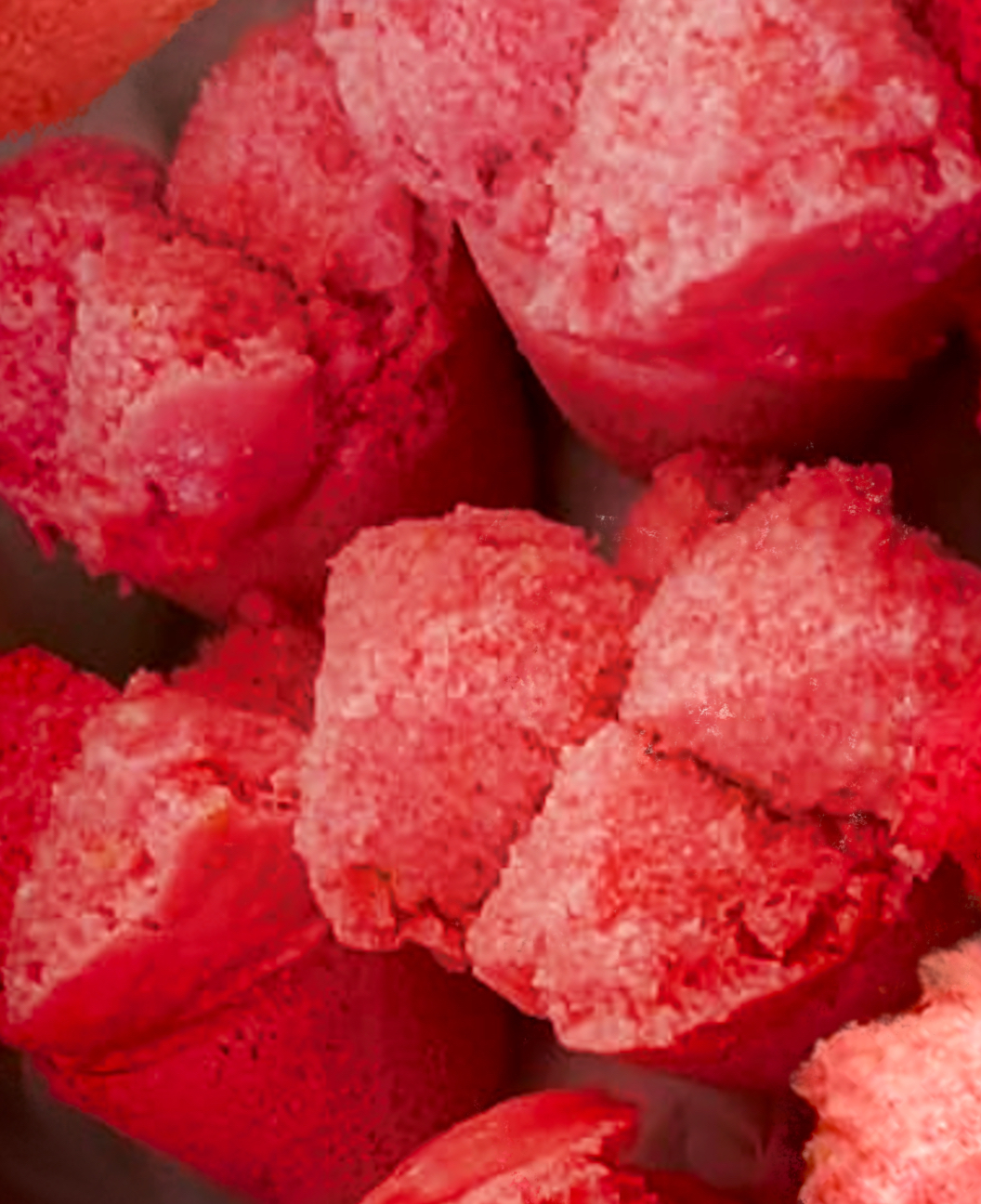
Mauritian Poutou Chinois.

== See also ==
- List of cakes
- List of pastries
