= Labutta District =

District in Ayeyarwaddy Region, Myanmar

Labutta District လပွတ္တာခရိုင်
- Labutta District (Red) in Ayeyarwady Region
- Country: Myanmar
- Region: Ayeyarwady Region
- Capital: Labutta
- Time zone: MMT

Labutta District or Latputta District (Burmese: လပွတ္တာခရိုင်) is a district in Ayeyarwady Region, Myanmar. Labutta District was established in 2008 after the region was hit by Cyclone Nargis in May 2008. The administrative seat is the town of Labutta (Latputta). The population of the district as of 2016 was 626,558 people.

59% the land area of the district is highly susceptible to flooding, posing significant risks to the cropland and brine ponds that make up the district's primary economic industries. Based on the 2014 Myanmar census, 335,700 people lived in these prone areas of the district.

== Townships ==
The district contains the following townships:

- Labutta Township
  - Pyinsalu Subtownship
- Mawlamyinegyun Township
