= Toddy palm =

Toddy palm is a common name for several species of palms used to produce palm wine, palm sugar and jaggery. Species so used and named include:

- Arenga pinnata, the areng palm
- Borassus flabellifer, the palmyra palm
- Caryota, the fishtail palms
- Cocos nucifera, the coconut
- Nypa fruticans, the nipa palm

== See also ==
- Sugar palm
