= Cyclone Nargis =

North Indian Ocean cyclone in 2008

Extremely Severe Cyclonic Storm Nargis
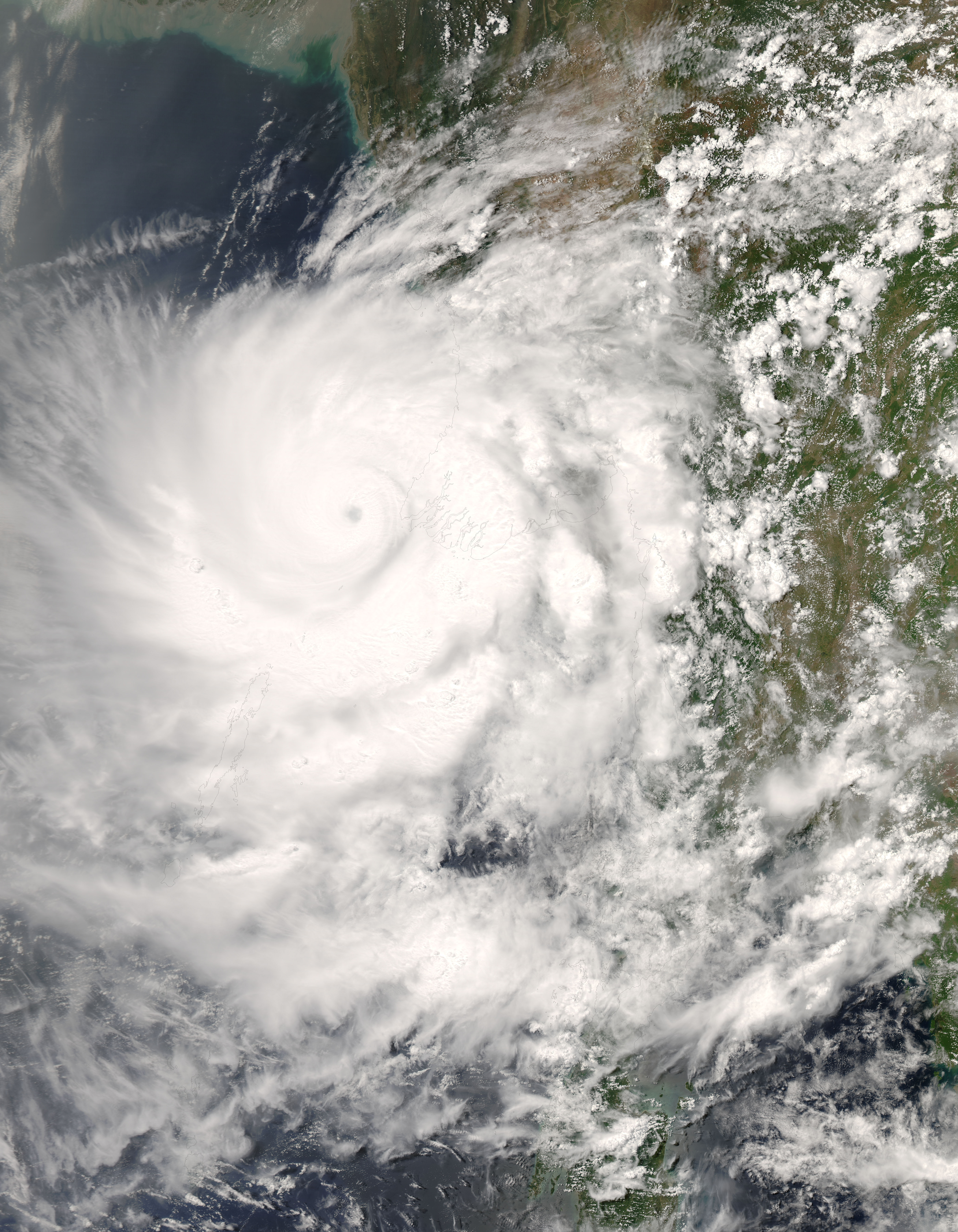
- Cyclone Nargis approaching Myanmar on 2 May

Meteorological history
- Formed: 27 April 2008
- Dissipated: 3 May 2008

Extremely severe cyclonic storm
- 3-minute sustained (IMD)
- Highest winds: 185 km/h (115 mph)
- Lowest pressure: 962 hPa (mbar); 28.41 inHg

Category 4-equivalent tropical cyclone
- 1-minute sustained (SSHWS/JTWC)
- Highest winds: 220 km/h (135 mph)
- Lowest pressure: 937 hPa (mbar); 27.67 inHg

Overall effects
- Fatalities: 138,373 total (Fifth-deadliest tropical cyclone on record)
- Damage: $15.3 billion (2008 USD) (Third costliest on record in the North Indian Ocean; costliest when adjusted for inflation)
- Areas affected: Bangladesh; Myanmar; India; Sri Lanka
- IBTrACS
- Part of the 2008 North Indian Ocean cyclone season

Extremely Severe Cyclonic Storm Nargis (Note: The name Nargis (Urdu: نرگس, [nəɾ.ɡɪs]) was contributed by Pakistan and means "narcissus" in Urdu.) (Burmese: နာဂစ်) was an extremely deadly and catastrophic tropical cyclone that caused the worst natural disaster in the recorded history of Myanmar during early May 2008. The cyclone made landfall in Myanmar on 2 May 2008, sending a storm surge 40 kilometres up the densely populated Irrawaddy delta, causing catastrophic destruction and at least 138,373 fatalities. The Labutta Township alone was reported to have 80,000 dead, with about 10,000 more deaths in Bogale. There were around 55,000 people missing and many other deaths were found in other towns and areas, although the Myanmar government's official death toll may have been under-reported, and there have been allegations that government officials stopped updating the death toll after 138,000 to minimise political fallout. The feared 'second wave' of fatalities from disease and lack of relief efforts never materialised. Damage was at 13 trillion kyat (US$15.3 billion), making Nargis the costliest tropical cyclone on record in the North Indian Ocean at the time, before that record was broken by Amphan in 2020.

The first named storm of the 2008 North Indian Ocean cyclone season, Nargis developed on 27 April in the central area of Bay of Bengal. Initially, the storm tracked slowly northwestward, and encountering favourable conditions, it quickly strengthened. Dry air weakened the cyclone on 29 April, though after beginning a steady eastward motion, Nargis rapidly intensified to attain peak winds of at least 165 km/h (105 mph) on 2 May, according to IMD observations; the JTWC assessed peak winds of 215 km/h (135 mph), making it a weak Category 4 cyclone on the SSHWS. The cyclone moved ashore in the Ayeyarwady Division of Myanmar at peak intensity and, after passing near the major city of Yangon (Rangoon), the storm gradually weakened until dissipating near the border of Myanmar and Thailand.

Nargis is the deadliest named cyclone in the North Indian Ocean Basin on record, as well as the deadliest named cyclone ever recorded. Including unnamed storms like the 1970 Bhola cyclone, Nargis is the fifth-deadliest cyclone to ever been recorded worldwide, but an uncertainty between the deaths caused by Nargis and those caused by other cyclones (like the 1991 Bangladesh cyclone), could put Nargis as the fourth-deadliest or higher, because the exact death toll is uncertain. It was also the 3rd deadliest natural disaster of the decade. Nargis was the first tropical cyclone to strike the country since Cyclone Mala made landfall in 2006, which was slightly stronger, but had a significantly lower impact. According to reports, Indian authorities had warned Myanmar about the danger that Cyclone Nargis posed 48 hours before it hit the country's coast.

Relief efforts were slowed for political reasons as Myanmar's military rulers initially resisted large-scale international aid. US President George W. Bush said that an angry world should condemn the way Myanmar's military rulers were handling the aftermath of such a catastrophic cyclone. Myanmar's military junta finally accepted aid a few days after India's request was accepted.

Hampering the relief efforts, only ten days after the cyclone, the 2008 Sichuan earthquake occurred nearby and measured 7.9 in magnitude, taking 87,476 lives and causing US$150 billion in damage in the process, making it the costliest disaster in Chinese history and fourth-costliest disaster ever known. Furthermore, some donated aid items were found to be available in the country's black market, and Myanmar's junta warned on 15 May that legal action would be taken against people who traded or hoarded international aid.

== Meteorological history ==
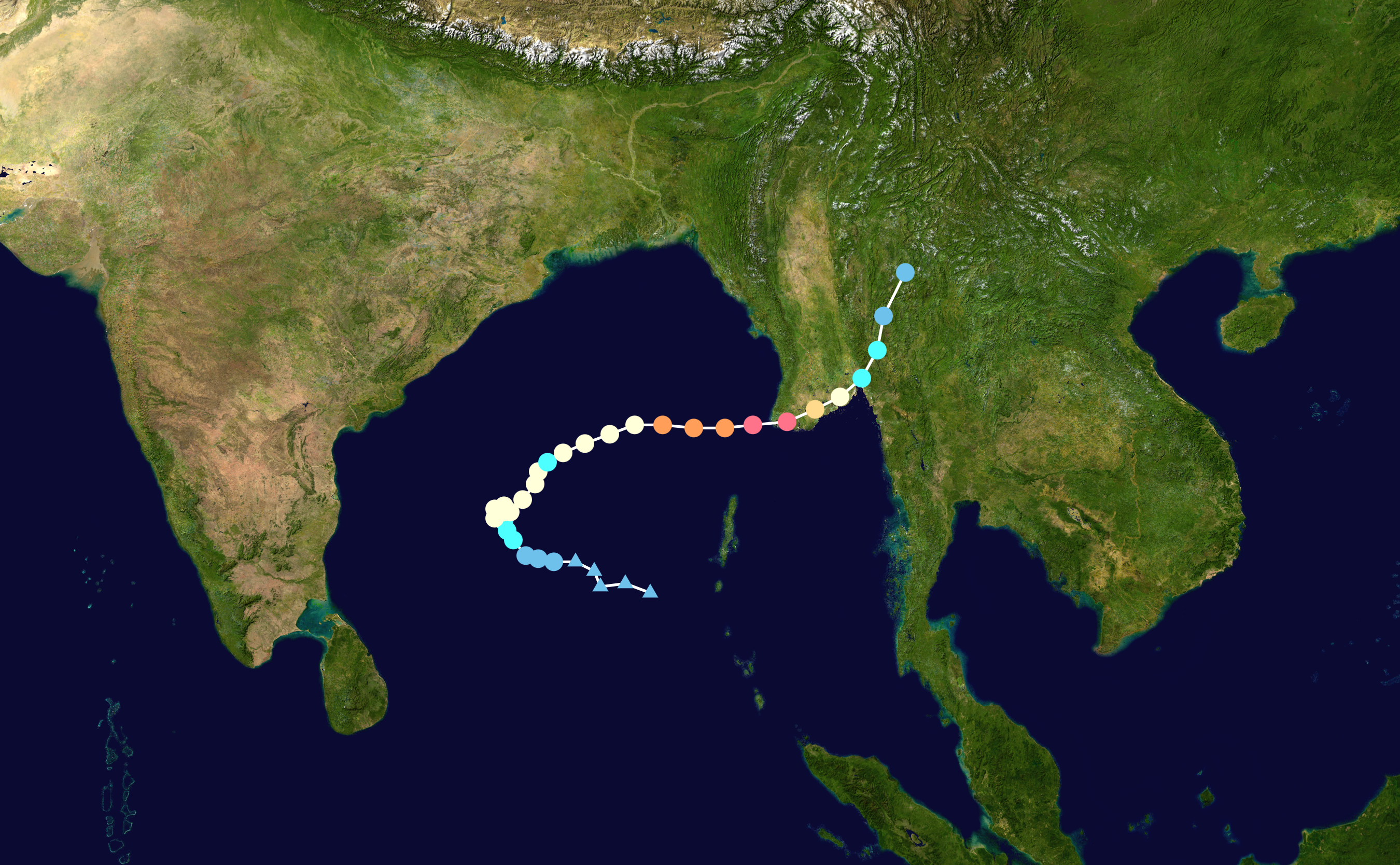
Map plotting the storm's track and intensity, according to the Saffir–Simpson scale Map key Saffir–Simpson scale Tropical depression (≤38 mph, ≤62 km/h) Tropical storm (39–73 mph, 63–118 km/h) Category 1 (74–95 mph, 119–153 km/h) Category 2 (96–110 mph, 154–177 km/h) Category 3 (111–129 mph, 178–208 km/h) Category 4 (130–156 mph, 209–251 km/h) Category 5 (≥157 mph, ≥252 km/h) Unknown Storm type Tropical cyclone Subtropical cyclone Extratropical cyclone, remnant low, tropical disturbance, or monsoon depression

Towards the end of April 2008, the Inter-Tropical Convergence Zone over the Indian Ocean became very active, with a tropical disturbance developing under its influence during 25 April. Over the next couple of days, the disturbance gradually developed further within an area of low vertical wind shear, before it was classified as a depression by the India Meteorological Department early on 27 April. Initially, the depression moved westward and was classified as a deep depression by the IMD, before the United States Joint Typhoon Warning Center (JTWC) initiated advisories and classified the storm as Tropical Cyclone 01B later that day. The system subsequently started to move north-westwards under the steering influence of an anticyclone and an upper-level ridge of high pressure. At 0000 UTC, 5:30 AM Indian Standard Time, on 28 April, the IMD upgraded the system to Cyclonic Storm Nargis, while it was located about 550 km (340 mi) east of Chennai, India.

On 28 April, Nargis became nearly stationary, while situated between high-pressure ridges to its northwest and southeast. That same day, the JTWC upgraded the storm to cyclone status, the equivalent of a minimal Category 1 hurricane on the Saffir–Simpson hurricane scale. Around the same time, the IMD upgraded Nargis to a severe cyclonic storm. The cyclone developed a concentric eye feature, which is an eyewall outside another eyewall, with warm waters aiding in further intensification. Early on 29 April, the JTWC estimated Nargis reached winds of 160 km/h (100 mph), and at the same time, the IMD classified the system as a very severe cyclonic storm. Initially, the cyclone was forecast to strike Bangladesh or southeastern India. Subsequently, the cyclone became disorganised and weakened due to subsidence and drier air; as a result, deep convection near the center markedly decreased. At the same time, the storm began a motion to the northeast, around the periphery of a ridge to its southeast. The circulation remained strong despite the diminishing convection, though satellite intensity estimates using the Dvorak technique indicated the cyclone could have weakened to tropical storm status. By late on 29 April, convection had begun to rebuild, though immediate restrengthening was prevented by increased wind shear.

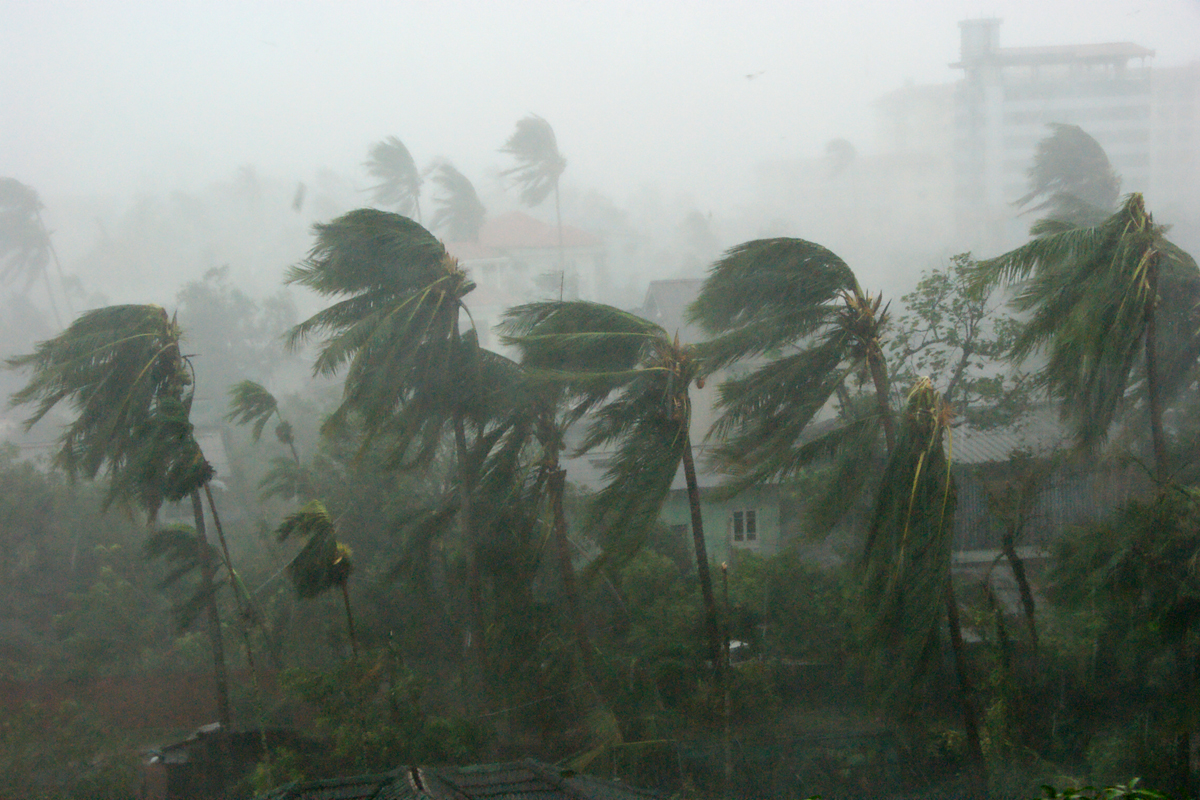
Conditions in Myanmar as Nargis made landfall

On 1 May 2008, after turning nearly due eastward, Cyclone Nargis began rapidly intensifying, due to greatly improved outflow aided by an approaching upper-level trough. Strengthening continued as Nargis developed a well-defined eye with a diameter of 19 km (12 mi), and early on 2 May, the JTWC estimated that the cyclone reached peak 1-minute winds of 215 km/h (135 mph), as it approached the coast of Myanmar, making it a Category 4 storm. At the same time, the IMD assessed Nargis as attaining peak 3-minute sustained winds of 165 km/h (105 mph). Around 1200 UTC on 2 May, Cyclone Nargis made landfall in the Ayeyarwady Division of Myanmar at peak strength. The storm gradually weakened as it proceeded east over Myanmar, with its proximity to the Andaman Sea preventing rapid weakening. Its track turned to the northeast due to the approach of a mid-latitude trough to its northwest, passing just north of Yangon with winds of 130 km/h (80 mph). Early on 3 May, the IMD issued its final advisory on the storm. Nargis quickly weakened after turning to the northeast, toward the rugged terrain near the Myanmar–Thailand border, and after deteriorating to minimal tropical storm status, the JTWC issued its last advisory on Nargis.

== Impact ==
=== Bay of Bengal ===
On 27 and 28 April, the cyclone enhanced the South-West Monsoon over Sri Lanka, which resulted in very heavy rain, flooding, and landslides being reported within the Western, Sabaragamuwa and Southern provinces. The districts of Ratnapura and Kegalle were the most affected, where more than 3,000 families were displaced. Thousands of houses were flooded, with 21 reported destroyed. The rainfall left 4,500 people homeless, and more than 35,000 people were affected on the island. Three people were reported injured on the island, while two were reported dead.

The India Meteorological Department recommended that fishermen should not sail on the ocean during the passage of Nargis. Strong waves and gusty winds were expected along the Tamil Nadu and Andhra Pradesh coastline in India. Additionally, the influence of the cyclone lowered temperatures along the Indian coastline, which had been affected by a severe heat wave.

When the cyclone was originally expected to strike near Bangladesh, officials requested farmers to hurriedly finish harvesting the rice crop. At the time, the country was experiencing severe food shortages from Cyclone Sidr in the previous year and flooding earlier in the year, and a direct strike from Nargis would have resulted in destroyed crops due to strong winds.

=== Myanmar ===
Deadliest tropical cyclones since 1900
Rank	Name/Year	Region	Fatalities
1	Bhola 1970	Bangladesh	≥300,000
2	Shanghai 1931	China	302,040
3	Bangladesh 1991	Bangladesh	138,866
4	Nargis 2008	Myanmar	138,373
5	Unnamed 1911	Bangladesh	120,000
6	Unnamed 1917	Bangladesh	70,000
7	Harriet 1962	Thailand, Bangladesh	50,935
8	Unnamed 1919	Bangladesh	40,000
9	Nina 1975	China	26,000
10	Unnamed 1958	Bangladesh	12,000
10	Unnamed 1965	Bangladesh	12,000

The United Nations estimated that 1.5 million people were "severely affected" by Nargis. It was the deadliest tropical cyclone in the North Indian Ocean since the 1991 Bangladesh cyclone, with estimates of people missing at 53,836 and 84,537 confirmed dead. At least 10,000 people were reported to have perished in the delta town of Bogale alone. The total death total is unknown, as critics of the junta argue that the numbers were unreported to avoid political fallout. It is now thought that hundreds of thousands of people will never be found after Nargis because their bodies have decayed, been buried, or were washed out to sea. Some NGOs estimated that the final death toll would be over 100,000, while one Save The Children's aid worker claimed that the death toll from the cyclone and its aftermath might reach 300,000.

Andrew Kirkwood, country director of the Save the Children organization stated: "We're looking at 50,000 dead and millions of homeless, I'd characterise it as unprecedented in the history of Myanmar and on an order of magnitude with the effect of the [2004] tsunami on individual countries. There might well be more dead than the tsunami caused in Sri Lanka." Foreign aid workers estimated that 2 million to 3 million were homeless, often going to one of 260,000 refugee camps in Myanmar. It was likely the worst disaster in Myanmar's history, and the total damages were comparable to that of the 2004 Indian Ocean tsunami.

Thousands of buildings were destroyed; in the town of Labutta, in the Ayeyarwady Division, state television reported that 75 percent of buildings had collapsed and 20 percent had their roofs ripped off. One report indicated that 95 percent of buildings in the Irrawaddy Delta area were destroyed. The Ministry of Religious Affairs stated that 1,163 temples were destroyed in Ayeyarwady Division and 284 in Yangon Division.

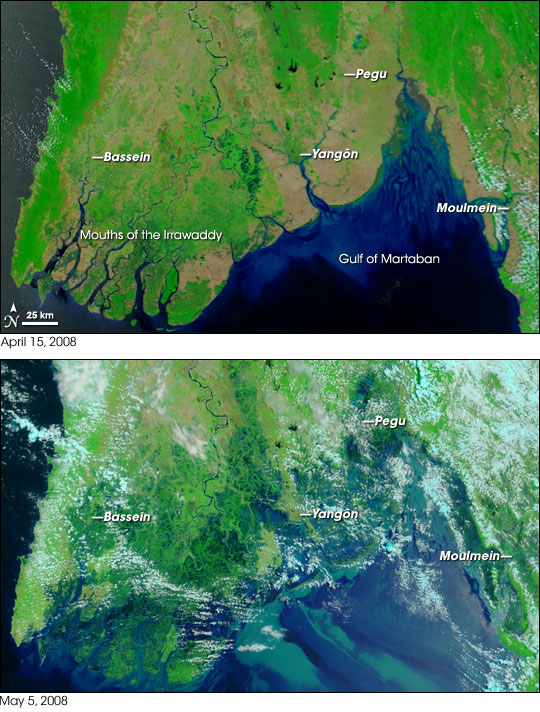
Satellite photography of the Irrawaddy Delta before (top) and after (bottom) Nargis hit the area.

A United Nations official commented as follows: "It's a bad situation. Almost all the houses are smashed. People are in a terrible situation." Another UN official said that "The Irrawaddy delta was hit extremely hard not only because of the wind and rain but because of the storm surge." Burst sewage mains caused the landscape to flood with waste, ruining the rice crop.

The Daily Telegraph (UK) reported that food prices in Myanmar could be affected. Woradet Wirawekhin (th: วรเดช วีระเวคิน), deputy director general of Thailand's Department of Information, Ministry of Foreign Affairs, stated on 7 May 2008 that, in reference to a report submitted by Bansan Bunnak (th: บรรสาน บุนนาค), the Thai ambassador in Yangon, conditions in the city had deteriorated and that most businesses and markets were closed. Mr. Wirawekhin also reported that the locals faced even more adversity in basic subsistence, because local food prices had increased two- or threefold.

== Aftermath ==
Costliest known North Indian cyclones (adjusted for inflation)
Rank	Cyclone	Season	Damage (2025 USD)
1	ESCS Nargis	2008	$22.9 billion
2	CS Senyar	2025	$20.1 billion
3	SuCS Amphan	2020	$19.3 billion
4	ESCS Fani	2019	$10.2 billion
5	SuCS BOB 06	1999	$8.58 billion
6	SuCS Gonu	2007	$6.86 billion
7	ESCS ARB 02	1998	$5.93 billion
8	ESCS Phailin	2013	$5.89 billion
9	ESCS Hudhud	2014	$4.87 billion
10	VSCS Vardah	2016	$4.53 billion

=== International relief ===
On 6 May 2008, the Burmese government representation in New York City formally asked the United Nations for help, but in other ways it remained resistant to the most basic assistance. On 7 May 2008, the government of Myanmar had not officially endorsed international assistance, but stated that they were, "willing to accept international assistance, preferably bilateral, government to government." The biggest challenge was obtaining visas for entry into the country.

According to Thai Rath Newspaper of Thailand on 8 May 2008, in the afternoon (Bangkok time) of 7 May 2008, the Burmese junta permitted Italian flights containing relief supplies from the United Nations, and twenty-five tonnes of consumable goods, to land in Myanmar. However, many nations and organisations hoped to deliver assistance and relief to Myanmar without delay; most of their officials, supplies and stores were waiting in Thailand and at the Yangon airport, as the Burmese junta declined to issue visas for many of those individuals. These political tensions raised the concern that some food and medical supplies might become unusable, even before the Burmese junta officially accepted the international relief effort.

==== Bangladesh ====
Bangladesh, which has had experience with cyclones in the past, was one of the first countries to supply aid to Myanmar in the aftermath of Cyclone Nargis. Two planes carrying aid, organised by the Bangladesh Army, were sent to Myanmar on 8 May 2008. They carried stockpiles of emergency aid and hundreds of aid workers with experience in coping with the aftermath of a cyclone.

==== India ====
India, one of the few countries which maintains close relations with Myanmar, launched Operation Sahayata under which two Indian Navy ships and two Indian Air Force (IAF) aircraft supplied the first international relief material to the cyclone-hit country. The two aircraft carried 4 tonnes of relief supplies each while the Indian Navy transported more than 100 tonnes of relief material. On 8 May, the IAF dispatched its third air consignment carrying over 32 tonnes of relief material including tents, blankets and medicines. India planned to send more aid to Burma. In a separate development, Burma denied Indian search and rescue teams and media access to critical cyclone-hit areas. India released a statement saying it had requested Burma to accept international aid especially that from the United States, to which Burma agreed. According to various reports, Indian authorities had warned Burma about the danger that Cyclone Nargis posed 48 hours before it hit the country's coast. As of 16 May 2008, India's offer to send a team of 50 medical personnel to set up two independent mini-hospitals in the Irrawaddy delta was accepted by the Burmese government. An aircraft carrying the team of doctors was being prepared at Delhi's Palam Air Force Base.

==== Italy ====
Italy provided €465,000 (about $732,282) worth of aid in the form of 30 tons of emergency relief equipment, such as stretchers, generators, and water purifiers in a flight organised by the World Food Programme (WFP). The flight arrived in Yangon on 8 May. This was the first aid flight from a Western nation, preceded only by aid from Thailand.

In addition to this aid, the Italian government provided €500,000 through the WFP and €500,000 through funding to relief agencies through the UN. An additional €123,000 was provided through the Red Cross, as well as €300,000 worth of further financing for emergency equipment.

==== Malaysia ====
Mercy Malaysia also trained 180 doctors from the Myanmar Medical Association in Yangon for deployment in the Irrawaddy Delta. RM 1.8 mil was collected for victims of Myanmar's cyclone victims through The Star Myanmar Relief Fund and handed to Mercy Malaysia executive council member Dr Ahmad Faizal Perdaus. A second Malaysian Red Crescent Society (MRCS) disaster relief team was sent to Myanmar on 21 May 2008.

==== Thailand ====
Thailand sent US$100,000 in supplies, thirty tonnes of medical supplies and twelve tonnes of food supplies from Thai Red Cross. Additionally, Chaiya Sasomsap, Minister of Public Health of Thailand, stated that the Government had already sent medical supplies valued more than one billion baht ($31.3 million) to Myanmar. Furthermore, the Government of Thailand dispatched, upon the permission of the Burmese junta, twenty medical teams and twenty quick communicable disease suppression units. Samak Sundaravej stated that "if Myanmar gives the green light allowing us to help, our Air Force will provide C-130 aircraft to carry our teams there. This should not be precipitately carried out, it has to have the permission of their government." On 7 May 2008, those units, with their subordinate aeroplanes, were permitted to land in Yangon, carrying drinking water and construction material.

==== United Kingdom ====
One of the largest sums was donated by the United Kingdom which committed £17 million (approx US$33.5 million). The UK's Department for International Development sent an international relief team to help with the co-ordination of the international relief effort. Another team from the same department was also on the ground inside Myanmar. The Royal Navy dispatched HMS Westminster to the area to assist. This ship was part of the Orion 08 group deployment but was detached on a contingency tasking. This mission was codenamed Operation Songster. Prime Minister Gordon Brown remained extremely critical of the Burmese régime and had not ruled out violating Burmese sovereignty by carrying out "forced airdrops" to deliver aid.

==== United States ====
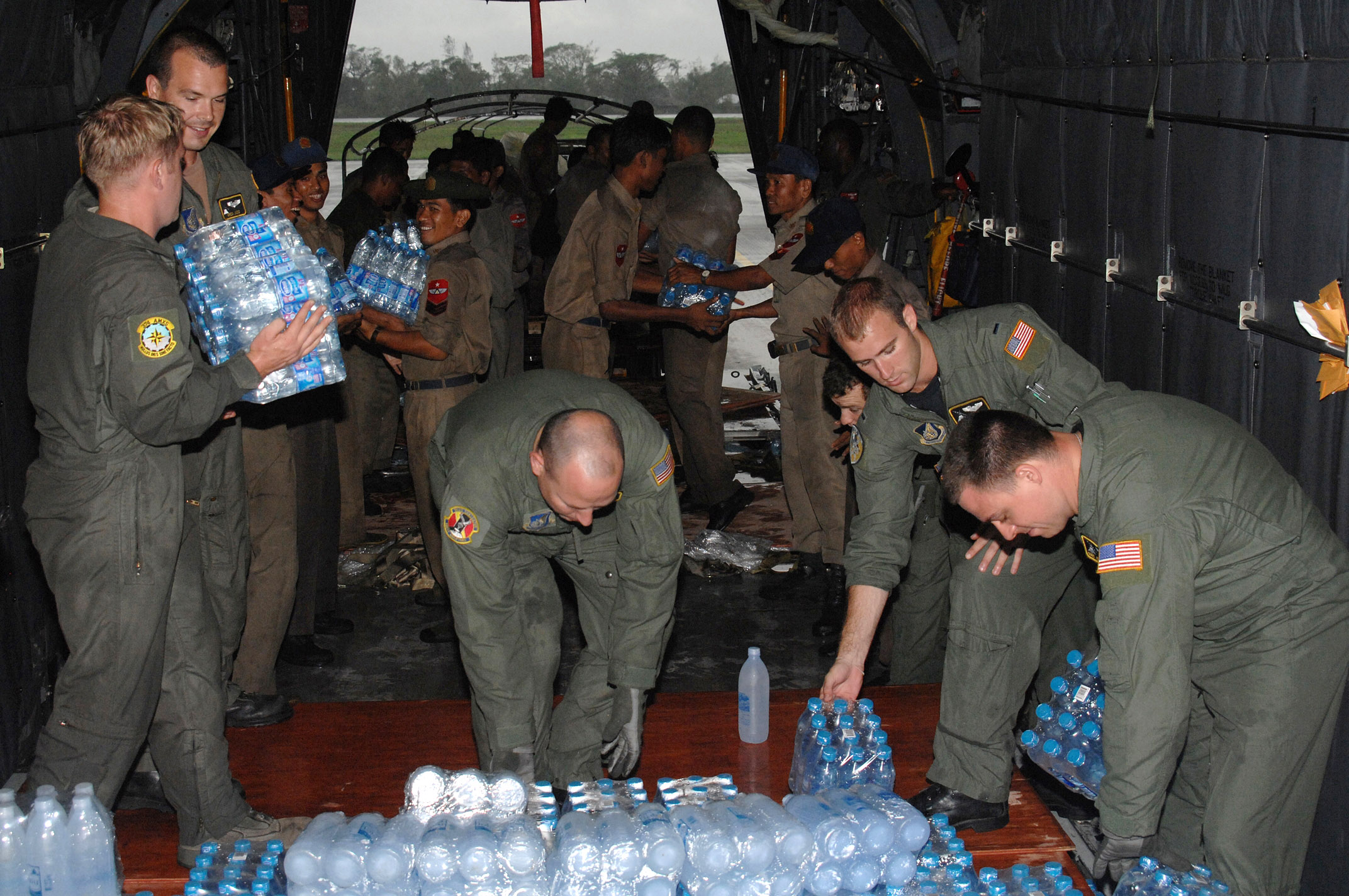
US Air Force personnel deliver relief supplies to Myanmar

On 5 May, US Chargé d'affaires in Myanmar Shari Villarosa declared a disaster due to the effects of Cyclone Nargis. In response, the US Agency for International Development (USAID) deployed a Disaster Assistance Response Team (DART) and immediately provided $2 million to UNICEF, WFP, and the Office of the United Nations High Commissioner for Refugees (UNHCR) for emergency food, water and sanitation, and shelter assistance.

On 6 May, an additional $3 million from USAID was allocated for the provision of emergency relief assistance, including $1 million to the American Red Cross and $2 million for NGO partners and on 12 May, USAID Administrator Henrietta H. Fore announced $13 million in food aid and logistics assistance through the World Food Programme.

From 12 to 20 May, USAID and the US Department of Defense (DOD) coordinated the delivery of nearly $1.2 million of US relief commodities to Rangoon on 185 DOD C-130 flights. The relief supplies would provide assistance to more than 113,000 beneficiaries. The DOD efforts were under the direction of Joint Task Force Caring Response.

As of 26 June 2008, United States assistance had totalled $41,169,769 and continued to be directed by the USAID DART stationed in Thailand.

==== Other relief efforts ====
On 15 May, the United Nations Office for the Coordination of Humanitarian Affairs (OCHA) launched the Burmese HIC website. The purpose of the site was to improve information exchange and collaboration between operational agencies responding to Cyclone Nargis. Based in Bangkok, the HIC was providing support to the Humanitarian Partnership Team and other humanitarian partners in Yangon, as well as those based in Bangkok.

By 8 May 2008, the Foundation for the People of Burma had a team on the ground in Rangoon and beyond providing direct assistance to thousands of refugees. Since this organisation was administered by Buddhist volunteers and already had tacit permission from the Burmese government, all donations went directly for supplies.

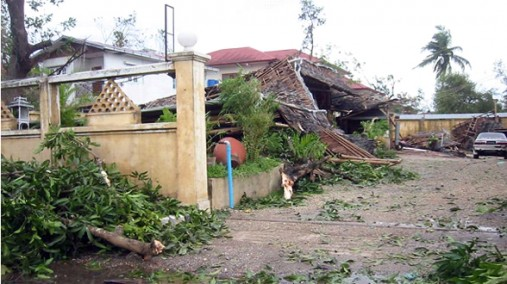
A destroyed house in Yangon

The International Federation of Red Cross and Red Crescent Societies had pledged $189,000 for relief. The federation had also launched an appeal of a further ₣73.9 million (US$72.5 million). Red Cross spokesman Matt Cochrane said that cyclone survivors needed everything. They needed emergency shelter to keep them dry, including food supplies. He said stagnant waters were a perfect breeding ground for the malaria mosquito, so insecticide-treated nets were needed. The Red Cross suffered a setback when a boat carrying supplies sank when it hit a submerged tree. Everyone aboard survived, but most of the cargo was lost. Ten Red Cross/Red Crescent relief flights carrying medical and shelter supplies were due to land in Yangon on 12 May.

Trocaire has been active in Myanmar since 1995 and were the first Irish aid agency to gain access after Cyclone Nargis. Relief work has been conducted mainly through local partners and membership of the international federation Caritas Internationalis. Trocaire had appealed for the focus of humanitarian work in Myanmar not to be lost in the wake of China's more recent earthquake.

Save the Children, one of the few agencies allowed to work in Myanmar, said the toll would likely sharply grow in the next few days as help reached isolated areas. On 18 May, it announced that it believed that thirty thousand children younger than five were already facing malnutrition and could starve in under a month if food did not reach them.

Médecins Sans Frontières landed a plane of 40 tons of relief and medical supplies in Rangoon. After clearing customs the supplies were transferred to local MSF warehouses. They have approximately 200 workers in the region, many of whom have been involved in long-term projects there and were already in the region.

World Vision launched a US$3 million appeal and sought to get international aid into the country. Staff on the ground were working to distribute food, water and other non-food items while WV Myanmar managers sought approval from the government to work in the worst affected areas and to bring in aid from outside.

Local NGOs also responded to the emergency, many adapting from human-rights or women's focuses to humanitarian emergency relief.

Country	Contribution
Association of Southeast Asian Nations	An assessment team and 30 medical personnel per country.
Australia	AU$25 million (US$23.5 million) and 31 tonnes of supplies.
Bangladesh	20 tonnes of food and medicine
Belgium	€250,000 (US$390,000) and €100,000 from Flanders
Brazil	Zinc roofing tiles, canvas tents and first aid items.
Brunei	Relief materials
Cambodia	US$50,000
Canada	Up to CA$2 million (US$1.98 million) in emergency relief, $500,000 of which is for the Red Cross, Disaster Assistance Response Team (DART) is on standby; additional aid to come
China	US$10 million in aid and relief materials (including 3 flights using Jade Cargo each consisting of 60 tonnes of aid)
Czech Republic	5 million Kč (US$306,000)
Denmark	10 million kr (US$2.08 million)
European Union	€39 million (US$60.7 million)
Estonia	US$51,200
Finland	€300,000 (US$467,000)
France	1,500 tons of medicine, food, and water; US$775,000
Germany	€4 million (US$6.22 million)
Greece	US$200,000, medicine and humanitarian aid
Hungary	Ft48,903,000 (US$300,000), medicine, food, humanitarian aid
India	More than 178 tonnes of relief materials; tents, food supplies, medicines. A team of 50 medical personnel was sent to set up hospitals in the Irrawaddy delta.
Indonesia	Rp 9,212,300,000 (US$1 million) in cash and other aids in foods and medicines
Ireland	€1 million (US$1.56 million)
Israel	US$100,000 plus food and medical supplies by private organisations
Italy	€1.465 million (US$228 million)
Japan	US$950,000 from the government; US$10 million through UN World Food Programme & US$570,000 pledged assistance
Laos	US$20,000 worth of food
Lithuania	Lithuanian government donated Lt200,000 ($90,000) to Red Cross.
Macedonia, Former Yugoslav Republic of	US$50,000
Malaysia	RM500,000 (US$147,000)
Netherlands	€1 million (US$1.56 million)
New Zealand	NZ$3.8 million (US$2.96 million)
Norway	Nkr10 million (US$2 million)
Pakistan	Relief materials and setting up of a mobile hospital in the affected region upon approval of Burmese government.
Philippines	Medical workers, relief goods in cash, C-130 Hercules with aid
Russia	80 tonnes of food (~US$5.5 million for 30 tonnes of grain delivered in October 2015 (Note: In prices of one bushel at the time of delivery.)), generators, medicine, tents and blankets
San Marino	€30,000 (US$47,000)
Serbia	Relief materials, medicines and medical supply.
Singapore	US$200,000
Spain	US$775,000 donation to World Food Programme
Sri Lanka	US$100,000 plus food and assistance of medical workers
Sweden	Logistical support and water cleaning systems
Switzerland	US$475,000 (initial)
Taiwan (Republic of China)	US$200,000
Thailand	US$100,000 plus food and medical supplies (initial)
Turkey	US$1,000,000 from Ministry of Foreign Affairs and US$600,000 from Turkish Red Crescent
Ukraine	40 tonnes of medicine, tents and blankets
United Kingdom	£45 million committed (US$72.3 million), Aid sent by HMS Westminster
United States	US$196 million (2008–2012)
Vietnam	₫3,195,000,000 (US$200,000)

== Myanmar controversy ==
=== Military junta's blockade of aid ===
In the days after the storm, the junta pursued a CNN reporter covering the effects of the storm. The reporter was eventually forced to leave the country out of fear of being imprisoned.

On 9 May 2008, the junta officially declared that their acceptance of international aid relief would be limited to food, medicines and other supplies as well as financial aid, but would not allow additional foreign aid workers or military units to operate in the country. Samak Sundaravej, Prime Minister of Thailand, stated that, following the request of Eric G. John, US Ambassador to Thailand, he would visit Myanmar on 11 May to urge the junta to open the country. Quinton Quayle, UK Ambassador to Thailand, later remarked that he would also join Sundaravej. However, the junta immediately replied that it was not willing to welcome anyone at this time. Sundaravej said that he would still submit the mediating letter to the junta without delay.

The delays had attracted international condemnation. Also, on 9 May in Bangkok, Richard Horsey, spokesperson of the United Nations, urged Myanmar to accept a full scale international relief effort. United Nations Secretary-General Ban Ki-moon urged the junta to allow aid in "without hindrance". Ban's comments came after the World Food Programme resumed food aid after two shipments of high energy biscuits were stolen by the military. The House of Commons of Canada condemned the Burmese government's response in a resolution passed unanimously on 9 May 2008. Oxfam International's regional chief Sarah Ireland warned that 1.5 million face death if they did not get clean water and sanitation soon: "It's really crucial that people get access to clean water sources and sanitation to avoid unnecessary deaths and suffering." Myanmar's government seemed unaware of the scope of the death and destruction Cyclone Nargis wrought on the country more than a week ago, it was reported 13 May 2008. Some critics were even suggesting genocide since the Burmese government had deliberately denied storm victims aid, allowing for hundreds of thousands to potentially die from starvation, exposure, and disease.

On 16 May 2008, the Burmese UN ambassador accused France of deploying a warship to the Burmese coast. The French UN ambassador denied the LHD Mistral was a warship, and claimed Myanmar's refusal to allow increased aid into the country "could lead to a true crime against humanity." France stated the ship in question was carrying 1,500 tons of relief supplies. UK Prime Minister Gordon Brown accused the ruling junta of allowing the disaster to grow into a "man-made catastrophe" through its failure to act. He also rebuked the junta as being guilty of inhuman actions.

On 19 May, Myanmar agreed to allow aid from members of the Association of South-East Asian Nations (ASEAN) to enter. The decision came after an emergency ASEAN summit. The aid would start arriving 21 May. Ban Ki-moon would probably visit the country the same day to "accelerate relief efforts". That day, Ban announced that Myanmar was going to "allow all aid workers regardless of nationality" to enter, although ships and helicopters were still not expected to be allowed. The announcement came after Ban had met with junta leader General Than Shwe for over two hours. Organizations welcoming the announcement included World Vision, the World Food Programme, and the International Rescue Committee.

On 23 May, negotiations between UN Secretary-General Ban Ki-moon and Than Shwe resulted in the opening of Myanmar to aid workers, regardless of nationality. Myanmar's government was still staunchly opposed to the presence of military units in the country, only allowing dedicated relief workers. On 5 June, a USS Essex-led American carrier group full of aid left the Burmese coast after being denied entry for several weeks, taking its aid back undelivered.

On 27 May, to complicate world opinion and in contrast to numerous and varied accounts from international relief organisations, the Burmese junta praised U.N. aid.

On 5 June 2008, Amnesty International released a report saying that at least thirty people had been evicted from refugee camps. The report also indicated that the military was horse-trading aid for physical labour.

=== Uninterrupted referendum ===
Despite objections raised by the Burmese opposition parties and foreign nations in the wake of the natural disaster, the junta proceeded with a previously scheduled (10 May 2008) constitutional referendum. Voting however was postponed until 24 May 2008 in Yangon and other areas hardest hit by the storm.

On 8 May 2008, about thirty protesters assembled before Myanmar's embassy in Manila, Philippines, demanding that the junta defer voting on the referendum and immediately accept international relief. The Philippine protesters delivered the statement that "this time is not the time for politics, but it is the time to save people." The United States Government also demanded that the United Nations not endorse the referendum. Aung San Suu Kyi, leader of the Burmese opposition, also stated that holding a vote for the referendum during this disaster would be a consummately unacceptable act. About 500 Burmese activists demonstrated on 10 May outside their country's embassy in Kuala Lumpur, Malaysia, demanding that Burma's military regime call off its constitutional referendum even as voting began despite a devastating cyclone.

In a public poll conducted throughout Myanmar on 9 May 2008 by Mizzima, a Myanmar news agency, 64% of those surveyed still intended to vote in the referendum. However, 71% did not know what the constitution was, and 52% had not yet decided whether they would vote to support or oppose it.

=== Aid distribution controversy ===
AP news stories stated that foreign aid provided to disaster victims was modified to make it look like it came from the military regime, and state-run television continuously ran images of General Than Shwe ceremonially handing out disaster relief.

More than a week after the disaster, only one out of 10 people who were homeless, injured or threatened by disease and hunger had received some kind of aid. More than two weeks later, relief had only reached 25 percent of people in need.

Nine days after the cyclone, the military government was still refusing to grant visas and access for aid workers into the area. The UN called for an air or sea corridor to be opened to channel large amounts of aid, and HMS Westminster was sent to the area, alongside French and United States military assets.

=== Activists respond to the blockade of aid ===
A Facebook.com page called Support the Relief Efforts for Burma (Myanmar) Cyclone Disaster Victims with 10,000 members used its members to organise a Global Day Of Action for Burma on 17 May 2008. with the help of Burma Global Action Network, Burma Campaign UK, Canadian Friends of Burma, the US Campaign for Burma, Info Birmanie, as well as countless local partners, a Global Day of Action for Burma a call for Humanitarian Intervention was held on 17 May 2008, in cities worldwide. An apparent response to the junta's blockade of aid to the Cyclone Nargis victims, the international community called for a humanitarian corridor to get aid into the hardest hit areas of Myanmar.

== Records ==
Nargis set many records for its death toll and its damage. In addition, when Nargis reached Category 4 on the SSHS on 2 May, it marked the only time that a Category 4 storm had formed in this basin for three consecutive years: starting with Mala (2006), going into 2007 with Sidr and Gonu, and ending with Nargis. It was the costliest storm in the Indian Ocean cyclone basin in recorded history at the time; it was eventually surpassed by Cyclone Amphan in 2020.

The official death toll of the cyclone is 84,537 with 53,836 people reported missing at the time of the PDNA and 19,359 injured. The total death toll sums up to 138,373, making Nargis one of the deadliest tropical cyclones on record.

== Private relief ==
Several international organisations were approved to support relief efforts within the country:

- Adventist Development and Relief Agency (ADRA) assisted survivors in the severely-affected Irrawaddy Delta by providing food aid, access to water, medical assistance, kitchen kits, and other necessary relief.
- The Aidmatrix Foundation provided an online co-ordination portal connecting businesses, groups and individuals wishing to offer products, services, or financial contributions.
- The American Jewish World Service provided emergency support to local organisations responding to immediate needs.
- Architecture for Humanity provided long-term support for sustainable reconstruction of housing, schools, clinics and other critical infrastructure.
- Giving Children Hope sent emergency supplies to local partner organisations.
- CARE had offices in Yangon that were damaged.
- Italian aid organisation Cesvi operated in over 40 villages in the Dedaye Township.
- Chevron Corporation contributed US$2 million, of which half went to the International Federation of the Red Cross and the other half was allocated to four other organisations: the International Organization for Migration, Mercy Corps, Pact and Save the Children.
- The Church World Service worked with the Myanmar Council of Churches on the relief effort.
- Direct Relief worked with several local partner groups and organisations.
- Doctors Without Borders/Médecins Sans Frontières had more than 200 aid workers responding on the ground.
- GlobalGiving had several targeted relief projects with grassroots organisations already in Myanmar, including the International Medical Corps and CHF International.
- Baptist World Aid operated search, rescue and medical teams, and also prepared humanitarian relief and a special water purification and clean water packing (waterbags) unit.
- Hewlett-Packard Foundation made a donation of US$250,000 via the World Food Programme (WFP).
- Lutheran World Relief worked through the Church World Service.
- LDS Church delivered several tonnes of food, blankets, and other supplies.
- LIRNEasia, an Asia Pacific-based telecom think tank made their donations through Lekadhikari of Amarapura nikaya, Sri Lanka.
- Mingalar Foundation, a Myanmar-based NGO, distributed food, clean water, shelter and medicine to 37,000+ unreached people (about 7,000 families) in 9 affected areas everyday, also accepting donations online with the help of Samui Island Hotels (USA/Thailand).
- Myanmar Red Cross appealed for help and is on the ground.
- Proximity Designs distributed US$17.9 million in aid to 2.49 million people following the storm and continues to help farming families rebuild through cash-for-work infrastructure projects in 214 villages throughout the Irrawaddy Delta.
- Save the Children is "one of the largest non-governmental organizations at work in Myanmar" and has launched a full scale relief effort.
- Sewa International has a network of volunteers and partner organisations active in the affected areas.
- ShelterBox Australian and other Rotary International bodies are assisting. ShelterBoxes started arriving on 10 May.
- UNICEF is in country and has already provided relief supplies.
- Unitarian Universalist Service Committee has joined with the Unitarian Universalist Association to launch a humanitarian relief fund to help survivors of the cyclone in Myanmar. The UUSC responds strategically to crises, especially when rights are threatened or when those in need are overlooked or neglected by traditional relief approaches.
- World Relief is working with partners in the Global Relief Alliance to bring vital aid to thousands in desperate need in the aftermath of the storm.
- World Vision has 600 staff on the ground.
- Nargis Action Group Myanmar Egress was involved in disaster relief operations in 4 severely damaged townships in the Delta region. In so doing, Myanmar Egress collaborated with some business companies that have been granted permission by the authorities to undertake in the rescue and relief work in several storm-hit areas in the delta. Myanmar Egress engaged in all these disaster relief activities under the name of "Nargis Action Group Myanmar".

=== Impact on rice supplies ===
The Irrawaddy Delta is such a fertile area for rice growing that it was known as the "rice bowl" of the British Empire. Production was high enough that Myanmar could feed its citizens a high amount of rice (by the standards of Asia) with enough left over to sell on the market. Since Nargis hit right around harvest, a rice shortage and famine could result. The United Nations' Food and Agriculture Organization estimated that Nargis impacted 65% of the country's paddies. They feel that the situation would be "devastating... if the recent disaster results in severe rice shortages." This might exacerbate the crisis already occurring, but it could be partially alleviated if fall and late summer harvests were good. Myanmar had since appealed for aid to assist with getting the rice planted, as its farmers had a 40- to 50-day window of opportunity before the season's crop would be lost. The Myanmar government estimated losses of US$10 billion because of the cyclone.

== Update ==
The UN Human Settlements Programme (UN-HABITAT) reported the extent of the international response as less than 7 percent of the actual needs for shelter after 15 months, although emergency shelter relief efforts were well funded. It estimated about 209,000 families had rebuilt their own homes after the first year. Out of US$150 million requested for shelter repair and reconstruction under the Post Nargis Recovery Plan (PONREPP) — a three-year recovery strategy running to 2011 — only US$50 million had been received.

== See also ==
- List of natural disasters by death toll
- Timeline of the 2008 North Indian Ocean cyclone season
- Tropical cyclones in Myanmar
