= Hydropower dams in Myanmar =

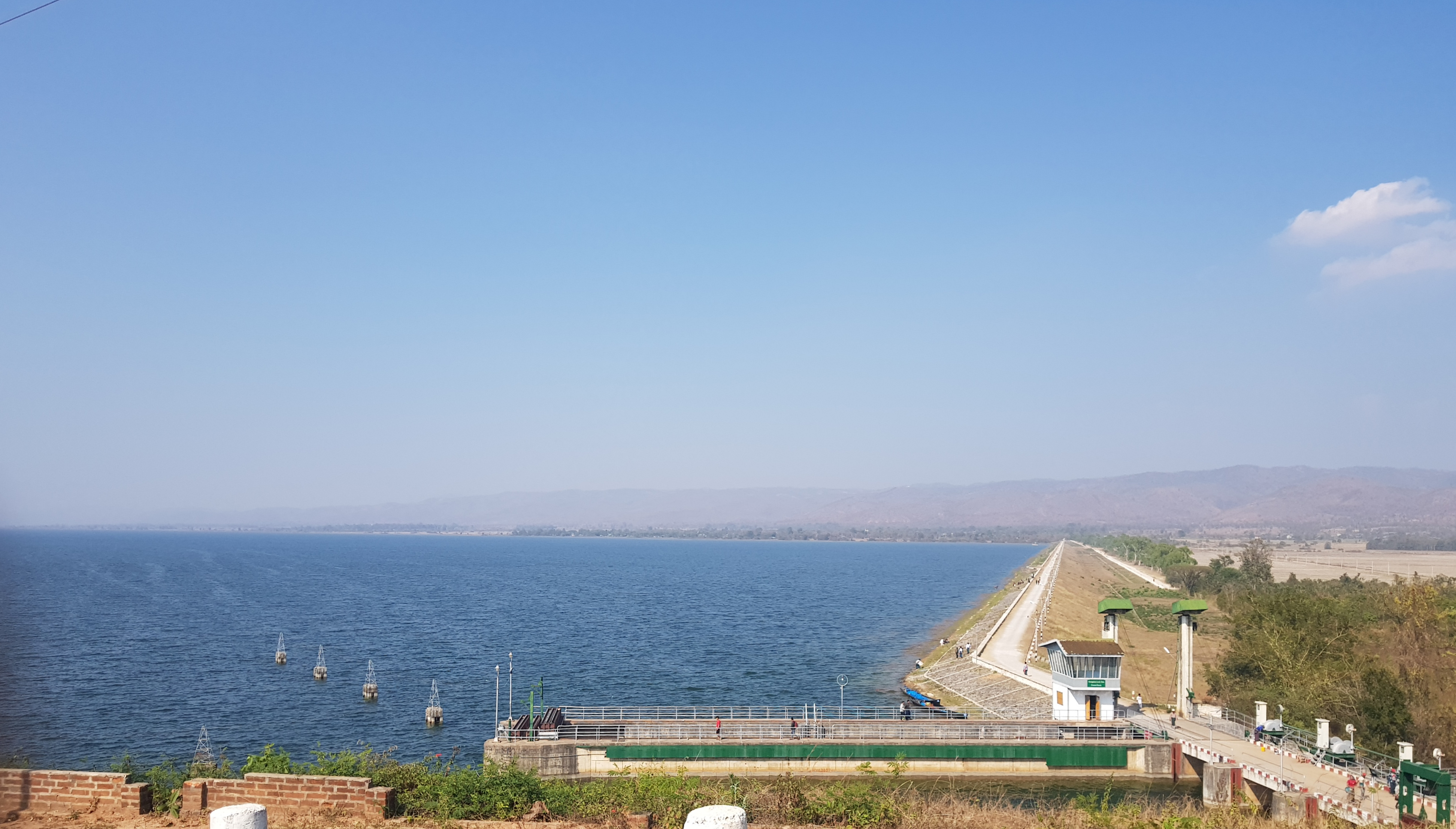
Moe Bye Dam in Shan State which is the main source for Baluchaung (Lawpita) Hydropower Plants

There are almost 200 large dams in Myanmar. Myanmar (Burma) has a large hydroelectric power potential of 39,000 megawatts (52,000,000 hp), although the economical exploitable potential is about 37,000 megawatts (50,000,000 hp). Between 1990 and 2002, the country tripled its installed capacity of hydro plants, increasing from 253 megawatts (339,000 hp) to 745 megawatts (999,000 hp). Total installed capacity in 2010 is at least 2,449 megawatts (3,284,000 hp) MW, 6% of potential. Several large dams are planned to increase future hydro utilization.

== Background ==
Although Myanmar is underdeveloped in terms of its hydro-power potential it is not for lack of effort. While chairman of the State Peace and Development Council, Sr-Gen Than Shwe prioritized the building of dams. A native of the Kyaukse region through which the Zawgyi River flows, Shwe was widely rumored to believe himself to be a reincarnation of Ko ko (r. 1044-1077). During his reign King Anawrahta was a prolific dam- and canal-builder, especially along the Zawgyi river. He viewed his hydro projects as atonement for killing his foster-brother Sokkate.

The total electricity generated by Myanmar in 2002 was 6,614 gigawatt-hours (23,810 TJ), consisting of oil (612 GWh, 9%); gas (3770 GWh, 57%); and hydro (2232 GWh, 34%).

Myanmar's hydro power development activities and plans include five-year short-term plans and a 30-year strategic plan. This involves generating power for domestic use and exporting to neighboring countries, especially China, Thailand and India. Total planned hydro power development in Myanmar is 14,600 MW.

Though the twelve large planned hydroelectric dams generating more than 1,000 MW gain much media attention, there are at least another twelve in the 100 - 1000 MW range and at least 27 smaller microhydroprojects less than 100 MW. The rest of the dams are generally lower-height irrigation structures.

At least 45 Chinese multinational corporations have been involved in approximately 63 hydropower projects in Myanmar, including several related substation and transmission line projects. The country's State Peace and Development Council Chairman Than Shwe met with Chinese representatives at the Shweli I Dam.

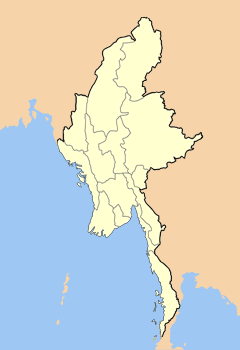
Map outlining the states and regions of Myanmar

Exploitable Hydropower Potential of Burma
State/Region	Number of Sites	MW
Kachin State	39	2,061
Karenni State	7	3,909
Kayin State	21	17,021
Chin State	22	1,312
Sagaing Region	21	2,399
Tanintharyi Region	14	692
Bago Region	11	387
Magwe Region	8	123
Mandalay Region	17	3,482
Mon State	10	292
Rakhine State	14	247
Shan State	83	7,699
Total: 12	267	39,624

The Asian Development Bank's October 2012 assessment of the energy sector in Myanmar reported on the country's abundant hydropower potential, with 92 potential large hydropower projects already identified.

== Major dams ==
=== Salween river ===
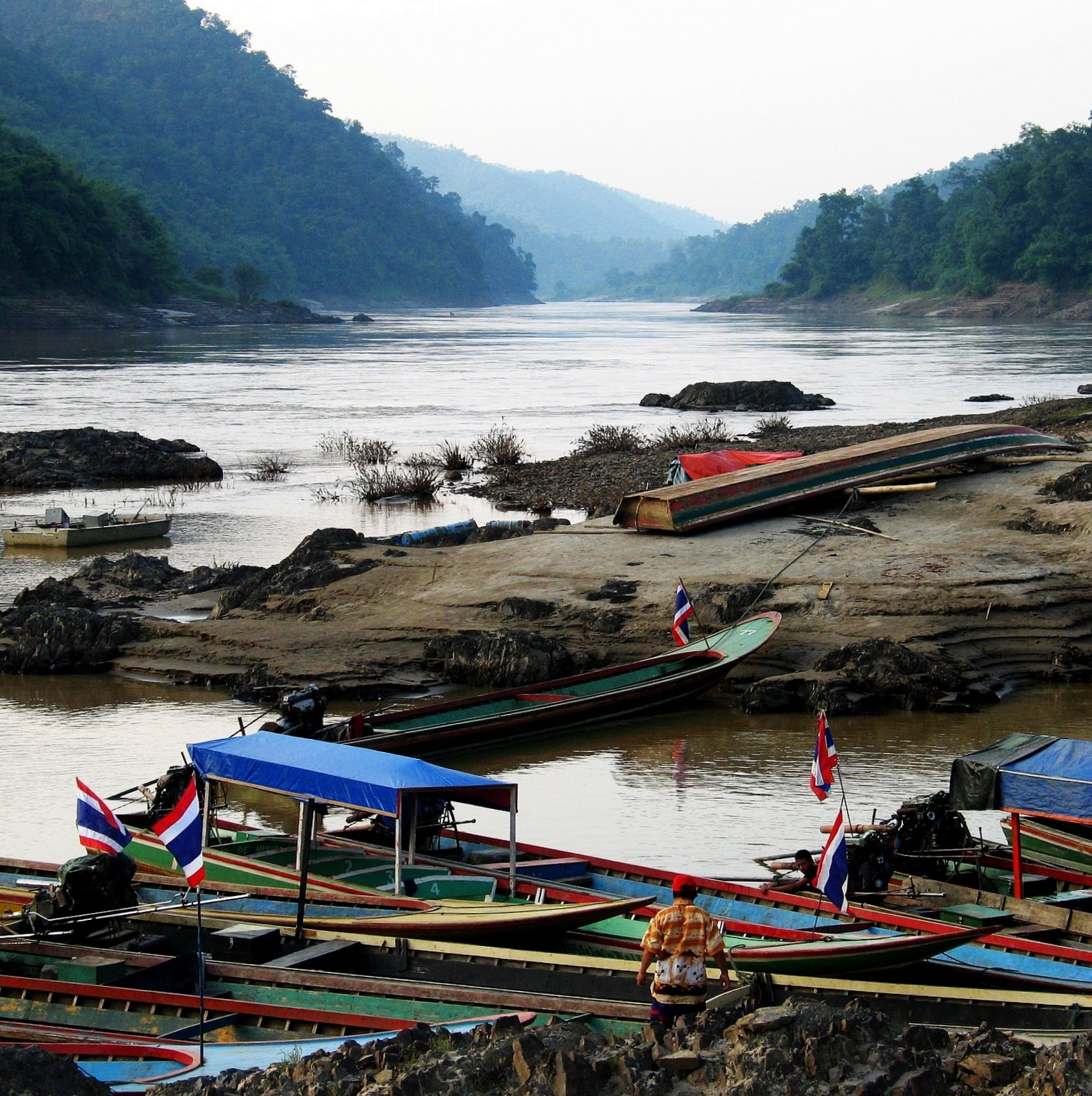
Salween River downstream of Weigyi Dam site

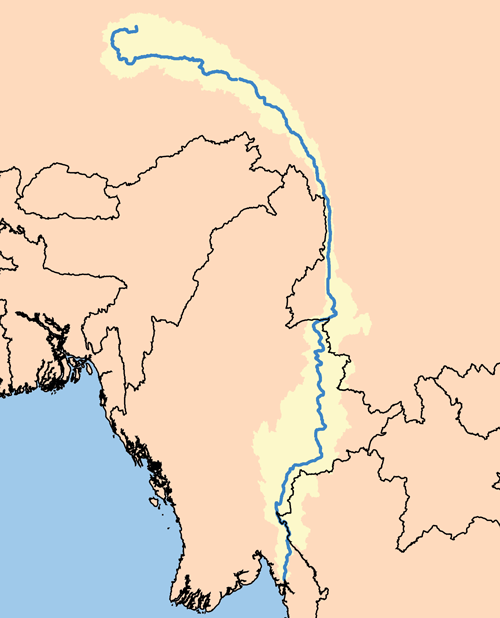
Salween River and watershed

Seven dams have been proposed for the Salween River. The largest of these hydro power projects is the 7,100 megawatts (9,500,000 hp) Tasang Dam on the Salween River, which is to be integrated into the Asian Development Bank's Greater Mekong Sub-region Power Grid. A groundbreaking ceremony for the Tasang Dam was held in March 2007, and China Gezhouba Group Co. (CGGC) started preliminary construction shortly after. China's involvement in the damming of the Salween River is not limited to the Tasang project.

In 2006, the government signed a Memorandum of Understanding (MoU) with Sinohydro for the US$1 billion, 1,200 MW Hat Gyi Dam along the Thai border. In April 2007, Farsighted Group (now known as Hanergy) and China Gold Water Resources Co. signed MoUs for an additional 2,400 MW hydropower project on the upper Salween, an area which Yunnan Power Grid Co. reportedly surveyed in 2006.

In April 2008, Sinohydro, China Southern Power Grid Co., and China Three Gorges Project Co. signed a strategic cooperation framework agreement for the development of the hydro power potential of the Salween River. Despite China's involvement in these large-scale dams on the Salween, most of the electricity is destined for export to neighboring Thailand.

However, In May 2009, Chinese Premier Wen Jiabao halted the construction of the Liuku dam on the Salween River in China's Yunnan province, calling for more thorough impact assessments.

=== Shweli River ===
The 1,420 megawatts (1,900,000 hp) Shweli I, II, III Cascade, in Shan State near the Chinese border, has also received significant Chinese support. Yunnan Machinery and Equipment Import and Export Co. (YMEC) began work on the Shweli I Hydropower Plant in February 2004 and, following the government's inability to secure funding, joined with Yunnan Huaneng Lancang River Hydropower Development Co. and Yunnan Power Grid Co. to create the Yunnan Joint Power Development Company (YUPD) in August 2006. For more information regarding the Salween River, see (Note: Mon Youth Progressive Organization. 2007. In the Balance: Salween Dams Threaten Downstream Communities in Burma; Shan Sapawa. 2006. Warning Signs:An Update on Plans to Dam the Salween in Burma's Shan State; Karen Rivers Watch. 2004. Damming at Gunpoint:Burma Atrocities Pave the Way for Salween Dams in Karen State; & Salween Watch, Southeast Asia Rivers Network & Center for Social Development Studies at Chulalongkorn University. 2004. The Salween Under Threat:Damming the Longest Free River in Southeast Asia. All available at 25 '缅甸萨尔温江战略合作框架协议签署 (Salween River Strategic Cooperation Framework Agreement Signed).' 金融界, 28 April 2008. 26 '激战瑞丽江——水电十四局瑞丽江电站截流施工纪实 (Shweli River Fierce Battle-Shweli Dam 14th Bureau Damming Construction).' Sinohydro Website, 26 February 2007. For photographs of construction at the Shweli I Dam site see '瑞丽江项目部图库 (Shweli River Project Bureau Photographs).' Sinohydro's 14th Engineering Bureau Dali Sub-bureau Website, 29 June 2007. 27 '中国在缅甸投资的首个水电项目成功截流 (China's First Hydropower Investment in Burma Successfully Dammed).' China Electricity Council, 13 December 2006. ; For more information regarding the Shweli Cascade see Palaung Youth Network Group. 2007. Under the Boot. Available in English and Chinese at Sinohydro's 14th Bureau Dali Sub-bureau Website).

A few months later, YUPD assumed an 80% share in the project after creating the Shweli River I Power Station Co. together with Myanmar, turned the Shweli I dam into a Build-Operate-Transfer (BOT) project, and increased the installed capacity from 400 to 600 MW. At least two Sinohydro subsidiaries have provided construction services for the project, and Sichuan Machinery & Equipment Import & Export Co. and Ningbo Huyong Electric Power Material Co. have signed US$ multimillion contracts for electricity transmission cables and towers. The Shweli I Hydropower Plant is slated for completion by June 2009, and was half complete as of May 2007.

=== N'Mai, N'Mai, Mali and Irrawaddy Rivers ===
In Kachin State, several Chinese MNCs are involved in the construction of seven large dams along the N'Mai Hka, Mali Hka, and Irrawaddy River, with a combined installed capacity of 13,360 megawatts (17,920,000 hp) In 2007, China Power Investment Co. signed agreements with Burmese authorities to finance all seven dams, as well as with China Southern Power Grid Co. Yunnan Machinery & Equipment Import & Export Co. (YMEC) signed an MoU with Myanmar's Ministry of Electric Power in 2006 to develop the hydropower potential of the N'Mai Hka. However, details of this arrangement remain unclear. Changjiang Institute of Surveying, Planning, Design & Research has also completed a feasibility study at the confluence of the N'Mai Hka and Mali Hka.

=== Others ===
In western Myanmar, just inside the Indian border, runs the Chindwin River, where several potential dam sites have been identified that are likely to service export-oriented hydro-power plants. The sites include Thamanthi, Mawlaik, Homalin, and Shwezaye.

In August 2001, the Kansai Electric Power Company, or KEPCO, contracted with Myanmar to provide technical assistance for developing 12 hydro-power plants, including at least five sites on the Sittang River Yenwe, Khabaung, Pyu, Bogata and Shwe Gin.

China CAMC Engineering Co. has been involved in the surveying and implementation of hydropower projects in the region. The 790 MW Yeywa Dam in Mandalay Region, which began construction in 2006, is also being financed and constructed by several Chinese MNCs, including China Gezhouba Group Co., Sinohydro, China International Trust and Investment Co. (CITIC) Technology Co., ChinaNational Electric Equipment Co., China National Heavy Machinery Co., and Hunan Savoo Oversea Water and Electric Engineering Co. Additional financial backing for the project is being provided by the China EXIM Bank.

In addition to the Yeywa, Shweli and Hat Gyi projects, Sinohydro China's largest dam company and its subsidiaries have been involved in the Kun Creek-2, Kyauk, Monechaung, Nam Hkam Hka, Paunglaung (upper & lower), Tarpein I, Thapanseik I, II, III, and Zawgyi I Dams. As with the Yeywa project, both CITIC and China EXIM Bank provided investment and financial backing for the Thapanseik Dam.

The Yunnan Machinery & Equipment Import & Export Co. (YMEC) has been one of the most active Chinese companies in Myanmar's hydropower sector. Since the 1990s, YMEC has been involved in more than 25 projects of varying size, including the Ching Hkran, Chinshwehaw, Dattawgyaing, Hopin, Kunhein, Kunlon, Kyaing Ton, Kyaukme, Laiva, Mepan, Nam Hkam Hka, Nam Myaw, Nam Wop, Nancho, Paunglaung, Upper Paunglaung, Shweli I, II, III Cascade, Watwon, Zaungtu, Zawgyi I and II, Zichaung, and N'Mai Hka River hydropower projects, as well as the Rangoon Dagon Substation. The extent of YMEC involvement in these projects, several of which are completed, is unclear, but appears to involve construction and some financing. (Note: '瑞丽江电站胜利实现截流 (Shweli River Hydropower Station Triumphantly Blocks Water).' Sinohydro's 14th Engineering Bureau Dali Sub-bureau Website, 11 December 2006. 29 'Myanmar Installs More Transmission Lines for New Power Plant.' Xinhua General News Service, 5 July 2007; 'About Huyong.' Ningbo Huyong Electric Power Material Co. Website. [Thanks toCourier Research Associates for providing this link.]; & '缅甸瑞丽江一级电站工程总承建包合同在昆签字 (ContractsSigned in Kunming for Shweli I Dam).' Sinohydro's 14th Engineering Bureau Website, 5 July 2007. 30 For more information, see Kachin Development Network Group. 2007. Damming the Irrawaddy. Available at)

== Lists of dams ==
=== Hydroelectric ===
List of operating hydroelectric dams in Myanmar
Name	#	Impounds	MW rating	Commission	Location
Shweli I Dam	1	Shweli River	600	2008-12	Shan State, near Man Tat village (Palaung)23°39′11″N 97°28′52″E
Zawgyi I Dam	2	Zawgyi River	18	1997-5-31	Shan State, Yaksauk Township 21.5646°N 96.8735°E
Zawgyi II Dam	3	Zawgyi River	12	1998-11	Shan State
Yeywa Dam	4	Myitnge River	790	2010	21°41′20″N 96°25′17″E
Dapein I	5	Dapein River	168	2005	
Dapein II	6	Dapein River	240	2006	
Upper Paunglaung Dam	7	Paunglaung River	140	2009-12	
Lower Paunglaung Dam	8	Paunglaung River	280	2005	
Zaungtu Dam	9	Bago River	20	2000-3	Bago Region
II	10		48	1960, 1992-8	Karenni State
Sedawgyi	11	Chaungmagyi River	25	1989-6	Mandalay Region, Mogok
Mogok	12		4	yes	Mandalay Region
Zawgyt (1)	13		18	yes	Shan State
Kattalu (Kyunsu)	14		.15	yes	Tanintharyi Region
Hopin Dam	15		1.26	yes	
Kunhing	16		.15	yes	Shan State; 21°18′0″N 98°26′0″E
Namlat (Kyaington)	17		.48	yes	Shan State
Chinshwehaw Dam	18		0.1	yes	Shan State
Kinda Dam	19	Panlaung river	56	1985	Mandalay Reg.. Thazi Township
Selu	20		.024		Shan State
Malikyun (Palaw)	21		.192		Tanintharyi Region
Matupi (Namlaung)	22		.2		Chin State
Maing Lar	23		.06		Shan State
Baluchaung I	24		28		Karenni State
Ching Hkran Dam	25		2.52		Kachin State
Laiva Dam	26		0.96 - 0.6		Chin State
Nam Wop Dam	27		3		Shan State
Nammyao (Lashio) Dam	28		4		Shan State
Chinshwehaw (Extension) Dam	29		.2		Shan State
Kunlon Dam	30	Salween River	0.5		Shan State
Zi Chaung Dam	31		1.26		Sagaing Region
Nam Hkam Hka Dam (Mogaung)	32		5		Kachin State (22°17′0″N 97°40′0″E)
Nam Suang Ngaung (Kyaukme)	33		4		Shan State
Lahe	34		.05		Sagaing Region
Tui swang (Tonzang)	35		.2		Chin State
Che Chaung (Mindat)	36		.2		
Thapanseik Dam	37		30	2002-6	Sagaing Region
Lawpita Dam	39		192	1992	Karenni state
Monechaung	40		75	2004	Magway Region (20.4786°N 94.254°E)
Shwegyin Dam	41	Shwegyin River	75	2011	Bago Region
Total	40	Hydro plants	3,048.5 MW	commission	All Myanmar

List of Planned Hydroelectric Dams in Myanmar
Name	#	Impounds	Capacity (MW)	Commission	Location
Myitsone Dam	1	Irawaddy River	6000	2017 est.	25°41′23″N 97°31′4″E
Chibwe Dam	2	N'Mai River	3400		25°55′46″N 98°8′21″E
Pashe Dam	3	N'Mai River	1600		26°29′0″N 98°18′59″E
Lakin Dam	4	N'Mai River	1400		Lakin26°35′45″N 98°24′22″E
Phizaw Dam	5	N'Mai River	1500		
Kaunglanphu Dam	6	N'Mai River	1700		
Laiza Dam	7	Mali River	1560		26°32′11″N 97°44′34″E
Chibwe Creek Dam	8	N'Mai River (Chibwe Creek)	99		25°53′40″N 98°8′40″E
Shwe Kyin Dam	10	Shwe Kyin Chaung (Stream)	75		17°58′24″N 96°56′15″E
Tarpein I Tarpien I	13	Tarpein River	240		
Tarpein II Dam	14	Tarpein River	168		
Nam Myaw Dam	16		4		
Shweli II Dam	17	Shweli River	460		
Shweli III Dam	18	Shweli River	360		
Upper Thanlwin- Kunlong Dams	19	Salween River	2400		23°31′54″N 98°36′40″E
Mepan (Meipan) Dam	22		1.26		
Kunhein (Kunheng) Dam	23		0.15		
Kyaing Ton (Kengtung) Dam	24		0.48		
TaSang Dam	26	Salween River	7110		20°27′23″N 98°39′0″E
Kengtawng Dam	27		54		
Kyaukme Dam	30		4		
Watwon Dam	31		0.5		
Dattawgyaing Dam	33		36		
Kyeeon Kyeewa Dam	39		75		
Buywa Dam	40		60		
Nancho Dam	41		40		
Paung Laung Dam	44		280		
Thaukyegat I Dam	45		150		Kayin State
Thaukyegat II Dam	46		120		Kayin State
Kapaung Dam	47		30		Bago Region
Kunchaung Dam	48		60		Bago Region
Yenwe Dam	49		25		Bago Region
Kyauk Naga Dam	51		75		
Hatgyi Dam	52	Salween River	1360		
Dagwin dam	53	Salween River	792		
Tamanthi	54	Chindwin River	1200		
Weigyi	56	Salween River	4540		18°37′47″N 97°21′39″E
Mobye Dam	57	Balu Chaung River	168		
Datawcha Dam	58	Balu Chaung River	28		
Tha Htay Chaung	59		111		Thandwe Township
Ann Chaung	60	Ann River	10		Ann Township
Sai Din Dam	61	Sai Din Waterfall	76.5	2014 est.	Buthidaung
Laymro Dam	62	Laymro River	500		
Shwesayay Dam	63	Chindwin River	600		
Taninthayi	65		600		
Htamanthi	66		1200		
Tajan	67				
Nam Kok	68		42,100 to 150		
Bilin	85		280		Mon State
Phyu	87		65		Bago Region
Bawgata	88		160		Kayin State
Ywathit Dam	89		600 to 4,500		Kayah State

=== Irrigation only ===
List of Hydroelectric Dams in Myanmar
Name	#	impounds	irrigated area	Coordinates	Pa Del Dam ( ပဒဲေရေလွာင္တမံ)	1	irrigation	Aung Lan Township, Magway Division	Chaungmagyi Dam	1	3,000 acres (12 km^{2})
Kataik Dam	2		irrigation								
Ngalaik Dam	3		irrigation & industrial water	Pyinmana Township							
Yezin Dam	4		irrigation	19°51′54″N 96°16′59″E							

In addition there were at least 10 major irrigation dams completed during the period between 1962 and 1988.

== See also ==
- List of power stations in Asia
- List of largest power stations in the world

== External sources ==
- Map of dams
- Photo Gallery of Dams from 1961 to 2004
- historical background of the Ministry of Electric Power
- Myanmar Future Projects 1. HYDRO
- Completed and On-Going Projects - Hydropower
