= List of power stations in Myanmar =

Power plants in Myanmar as of 2020 Hydropower Coal Solar

The following is a list of the power stations in Myanmar.

== Coal ==
Name	Location	Capacity (MW)	Commissioned	Sponsor	Refs
Takyit		120	2002		
Pathein	Nganyoutkaung, Pathein	660	Feasibility study	Tata Power Pathein	
Mandalay	Mandalay	500	Feasibility study	Mudajaya Group	
Kalewa	Myan	600	Pre-permit development	ISDN Holdings and Tun Thwin Mining	
Mai Khot	Shan	405	Construction	Italian-Thai Development Public Company	
Launglon	Launglon township, Dawei district	500	Feasibility study	24 Hour Mining and Industry	
Htantabin	Yangon Region	270	MoU expired	Huaneng Lancang, Htoo Trading	
Kungyan Gone	Thaungkon Village, Kungyangun Township	3,270	Feasibility study	Kaung Myat Thaw Myae Co. Ltd.	
Kyauktan	Kyauktan Township, Yangon, Myanmar	500	Feasibility study	Diamond Palace Services Orange (Myanmar), Powergen (India), and Global Adviser (Singapore)	
Inn Din	Inn Din village, Ye Township, Mon State	1,280	Negotiating local people	Italian-Thai Development and Toyo Engineering	
Bukit Asam minemouth	underdetermined	200	Feasibility study	Bukit Asam	

== Gas ==
Name	Location	Capacity (MW)	Commissioned	Owner	Refs
Ahlone GT + TTPM Co, Ltd	Ahlone, Yangon Division	154 + 121	1995-1999/2013-2015	EPGE/TTMP Co, Ltd	
Hlawga GT + MCP Co, Ltd	Mingalardon, Yangon Division	154 + 50	1996-1999/2013-2015	EPGE/MCP Co, Ltd	
Shwe Taung GT	Shwe Taung, Bago Division	55	1982-1984-2006	EPGE	
Ywama GT + MSP Co, Ltd	Insein, Yangon Division	310 + 52	1980-2004-2014/2014	EPGE/MSP Co, Ltd	
Thilawa GT + CNTIC VPower LNG	Kyauk Tan, Yangon Division	50 + 350	2016/2020	EPGE/CNTIC VPower	
Thaton GT + CEEC	Thaton, Mon State	60 + 118	1995-1999/2018	EPGE/CEEC	
Tharkaytha GT + Max Power Co, Ltd	Tharkaytha, Yangon Division	92 + 50	1990-1997/2013	EPGE/Max Power Co, Ltd	
Shwe Taung Gas Engine Based Power Plant	Shwe Taung, Bago Division	28 + 42	2020/2022	EPGE	

== Hydroelectric ==
Name	Location	Capacity (MW)	Commissioned	Owner	Refs
Baluchaung	Kayah state	168	1960-1974	EPGE	
Chibwayage	Kachin state	99	2013	EPGE	
Kabaung		30	2008		
Kyaukme		140			
Lower Paunglaung		280	2004-2005		
Nancho		?	2014-2015		
Mone		75	2004		
Shweli I		600	2008-2009		
Upper Paunglaung		140	2015		
Yeywa		790	2010		
Myittha	Magway Region	40	2014-2015		
Yazagyo		?	2014-2015		

== See also ==
- Energy in Myanmar
- List of largest power stations in the world
