= Energy in Myanmar =

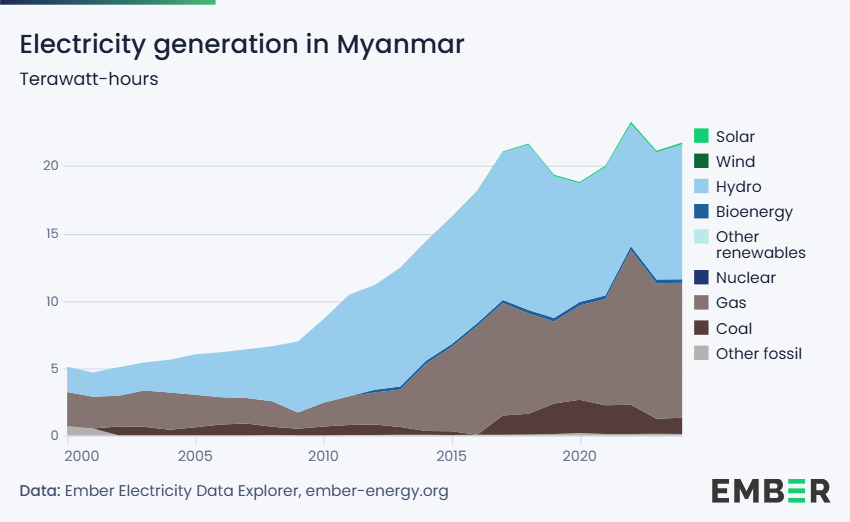
Electricity generation in Myanmar in terawatt-hours

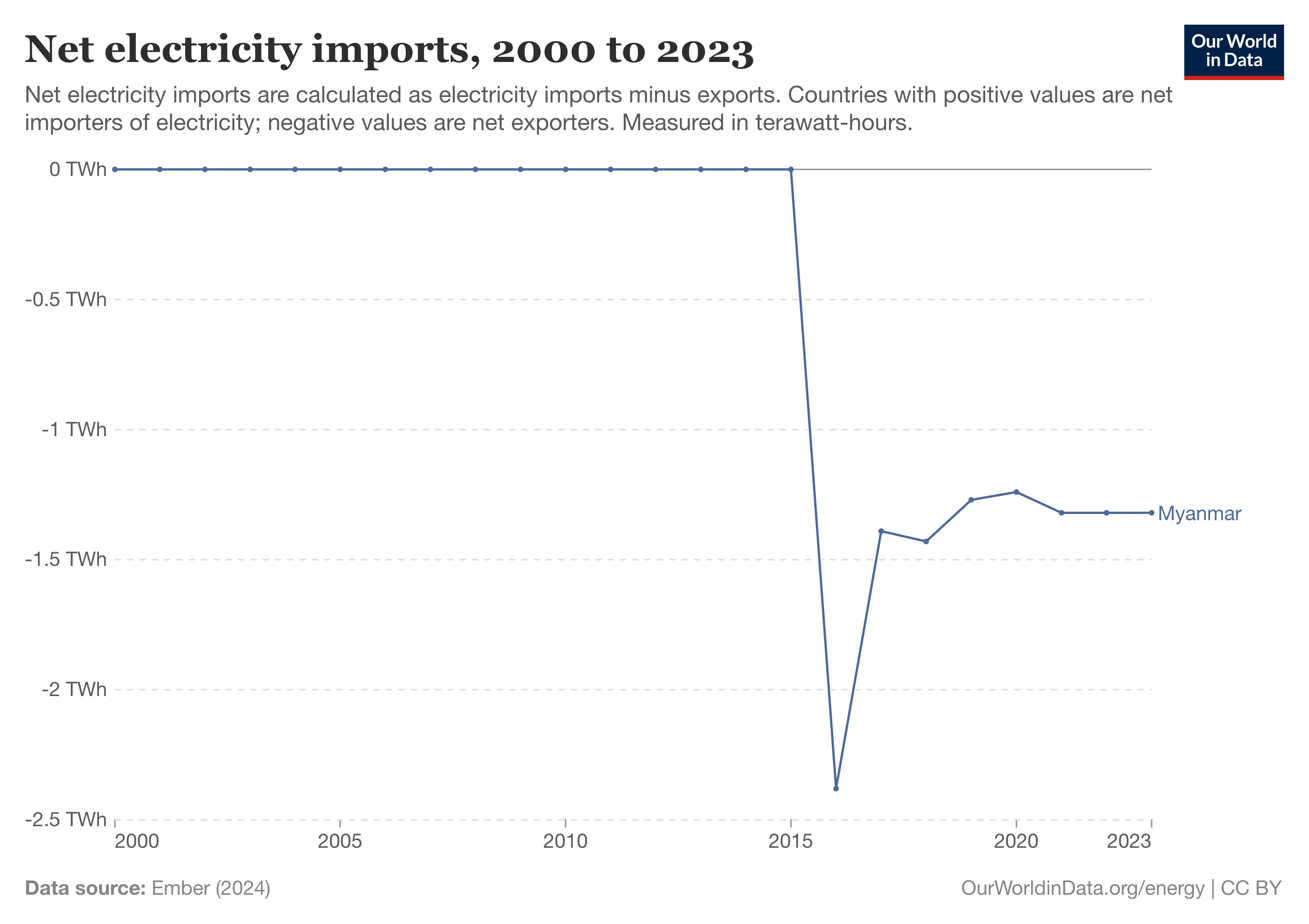
Myanmar began exporting electricity in 2016

Myanmar's energy sector is characterised by low per capita energy consumption and a limited electrification rate, with an estimated 65% of the population lacking access to the national grid as of 2019. Most of the country's rural population relies on biomass, such as wood, as their primary energy source. Myanmar has abundant energy resources, particularly hydropower and natural gas. In 2017, electricity production was dominated by hydropower, which accounted for 74.7% of total generation. By 2020, the share of hydro had fallen to 54% as natural gas grew to 40%. In 2019, the government aimed to achieve 100% electrification by 2030 and to increase the share of renewable energy to 12% by 2025.

Myanmar's abundant energy resources have made it a net energy exporter in Southeast Asia. Hydropower potential is estimated for a generation capacity of 140 TWh annually, though future developments are mainly planned for export. Solar energy development is seen as a key climate change mitigation strategy. The oil and gas sector is a large part of the economy, with Myanmar serving as a net exporter of natural gas to countries like China and Thailand. However, infrastructure like the Sino-Myanmar pipelines has also become a geopolitical focal point for the country's internal conflicts.

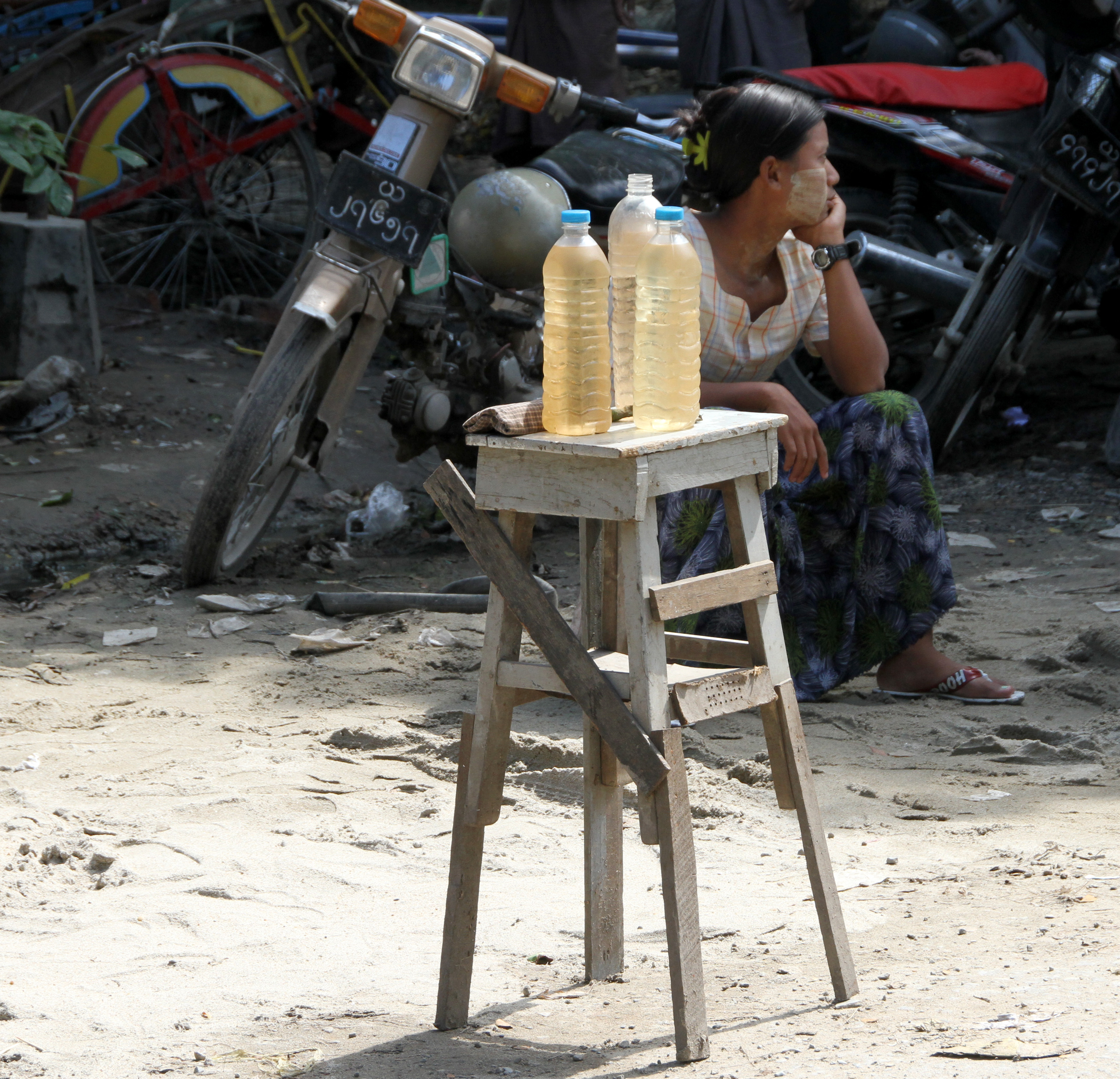
Roadside petrol station in rural Mandalay Region

== Energy usage and Electrification ==
Myanmar had a total primary energy supply (TPES) of 16.57 Mtoe in 2013. Electricity consumption was 8.71 TWh. 65% of the primary energy supply consists of biomass energy, used almost exclusively (97%) in the residential sector. Myanmar's energy consumption per capita is one of the lowest in Southeast Asia due to the low electrification rate and a widespread poverty. An estimated 65% of the population is not connected to the national grid.

The electrification rate in Myanmar is one of the lowest in Asia, at 50% in 2019. As of 2023, only 73.7% of the population had access to at least 4 hours of electricity per day. The electrification rate is especially low in rural villages, which are mainly not connected to the power grid. Wood and biomass are used as a primary source of energy in these areas. Energy consumption is growing rapidly, however, with an average annual growth rate of 3.3% from 2000 to 2007. In 2015, a World Bank report found significant needs for growing energy demand associated with the 2010s' rapid economic growth in the context most existing energy development projects being export-orientated. The country plans to achieve 100% electrification by 2030.

=== Energy mix ===
In 2017, Myanmar's electricity was primarily produced by hydroelectricity (74.7%). The rest is from fossil fuels, with gas as the main fuel (20.5%) followed by coal and oil. Myanmar had an installed electricity generation capacity of about 5 gigawatts (GW). In May 2020, the total installed capacity of Myanmar was 6034 MW: 3262 MW of hydro power (54%), 2496 MW of natural gas (41%), 120 MW of coal (2%), 116 MW of diesel (2%) and 40 MW of solar (1%). The cost of electricity production was revealed to be 12 kyats per Kwh for government owned hydro power plants, 72 kyats per Kwh for privately owned hydropower plants, 150 to 190 kyats for natural gas plants and 195 kyats for solar power plants.

== Hydropower ==
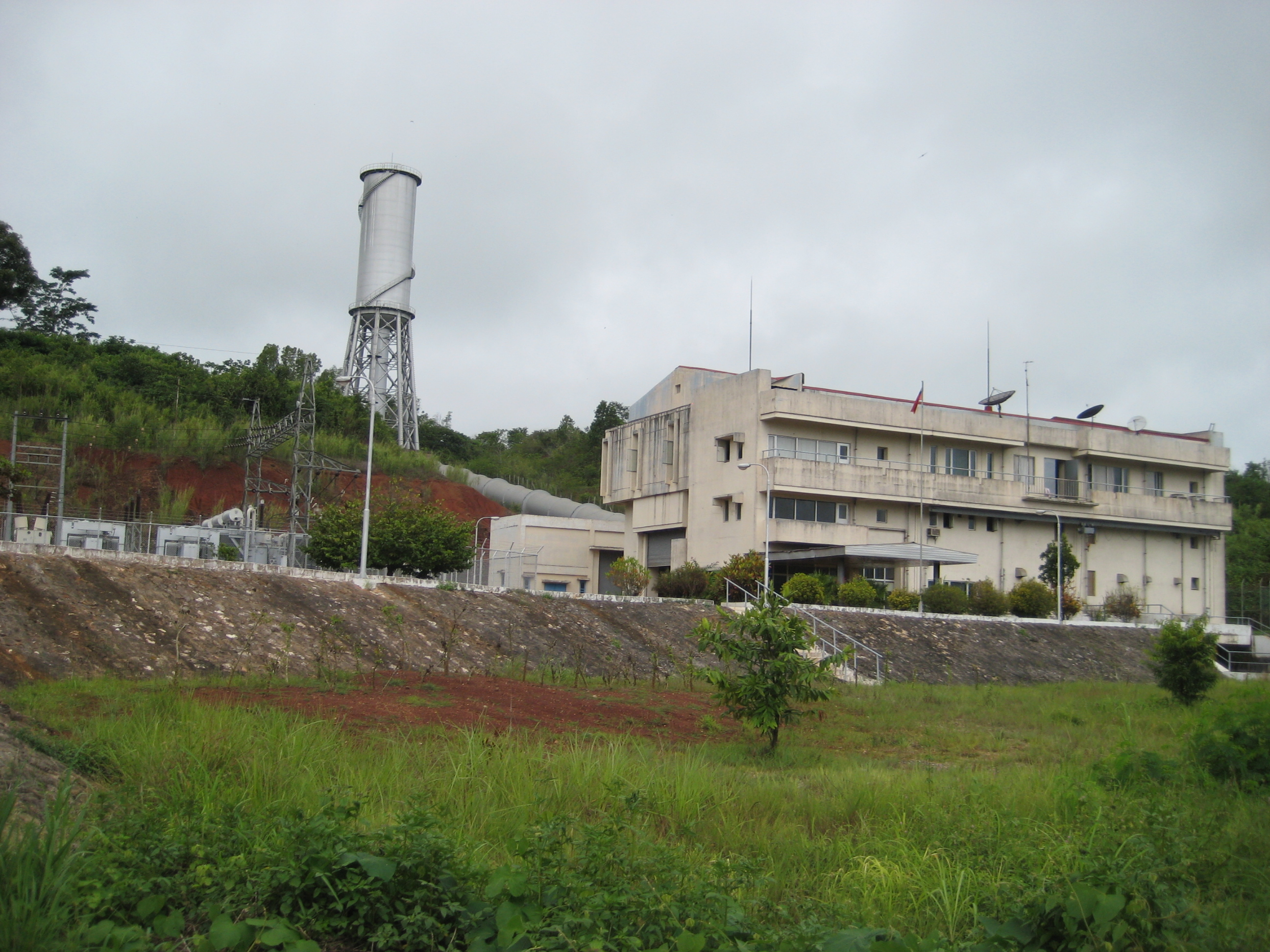
Baluchaung Hydroelectric Power Station No.1 at the Lawpita Dam, Kayah State

Hydropower resources are estimated to be about 40 GW at a capacity factor of 0.40, giving a total yearly hydropower generation capacity of about 140 TWh. Installed hydropower capacity as of 2011 was 1.54 GW with a total generation of 3.9 TWh, there is, therefore, a substantial opportunity for further growth of this energy source.

The Shweli 1 hydroelectric power plant, with a capacity of 600 megawatts (MW), started operation in 2008. The Yeywa hydropower plant opened in 2010 with a capacity of 790 MW, the largest in the country. Several other hydropower projects are under construction or planned. Planned major hydropower plants have been designed mainly for export. The Myitsone Dam project, with a capacity of 6,000 MW, is expected to supply 100% of its electricity to China, while the Tasang Dam project with a planned capacity of 7,110 MW is planned to supply 1,500 MW to Thailand.

== Oil and gas ==
The energy sector is considered a strategic industry by the Myanmar government and the petroleum sector is one of the biggest recipients of foreign direct investment.

In 2013, Myanmar exported 8561 ktoe of natural gas and 144 ktoe of crude oil. The country is one of the five major energy exporters in the region and is the second biggest exporter of natural gas in the Asia Pacific region after Indonesia. According to the World Energy Council, gas reserves are estimated at 244 Mtoe. Oil and coal play a smaller role with reserves estimated at 7 and 1 Mtoe, respectively.

In 2015, Myanmar had four offshore natural gas producing fields, with the earliest Yadana field starting production in 1999. Onshore gas producing was older with the Mann field running since 1970. Gas pipelines with stakeholders from Korea, Thailand, India, China and the Myanma Oil and Gas Enterprise (MOGE). As a net gas exporter, Myanmar supplied gas to China and Thailand due to limited domestic consumption.

The longest of these pipelines, the Sino-Myanmar pipelines, became a point of focus for both sides to gain support from or leverage against Chinese interests in the 2021 Myanmar civil war, being increasingly caught between combatants.

== Solar energy ==
the location of Solar Power Plant Projects

Developing solar energy in Myanmar is viewed as an important climate change mitigation measure for the country that is highly vulnerable to the detrimental impacts of climate change.

Myanmar has one solar power plant operating in Minbu, Magway Division. The plant has the capacity to produce 170 MW of electricity. The country plans to build two more solar power plants Mandalay Division, each to have a generation capacity of 150 MW. Energy subsidies for electricity and lacking tax policy, lack of qualified workforce and limited public administration capacity are viewed to be among the main obstacles complicating development of solar energy in Myanmar. Another study identified three major barriers to promoting solar energy in Myanmar: weak renewable energy governance, lacking clear regulatory mechanisms, and the complicated investment climate for international investors.

On 18 May 2020, the Ministry of Electricity and Energy issued an invitation to submit prequalifying bids for the construction of several solar plants throughout the country, with a combined capacity of 1060 MW. The ministry received more than 150 bids for the tenders and on 9 September 2020 bidders were announced. All but one of the winning bids for the 30 sites involved Chinese companies, with unit price ranging from 3.48 US cents to 5.1 cents per kilowatt hour.

== Wind energy ==
Myanmar's Department of Renewable Energy and Hydropower Plants is prioritising the development of solar and wind energy. Rakhine State, Tanintharyi and Ayeyarwady regions have been identified as sites with strong wind power potential. However, solar energy potential is higher compared to that of wind energy in Myanmar.

Myanmar is developing its first wind power plant in Chaung Thar, Ayeyarwady Region, through a 30 MW wind power project it is undertaking with China's Three Gorges Corporation. As of 2023, there was no wind power connected to the electricity grid.
