= Kyaukme Dam =

Dam in Myanmar

Coordinates: 22°1′49″N 96°58′0″E

Kyaukme dam ( Upper Yeywa Hydropower Project) is a dam in Burma. This 140 MW hydroelectric dam is built across Myitnge River near Taungchay Village in Kyaukme Township, 65 miles (105 km) upstream of Yeywa Hydropower Project The project was initiated by the Chinese firm Yunnan Machinery & Equipment Import & Export Co. (YMEC).
