= Shwegyin Dam =

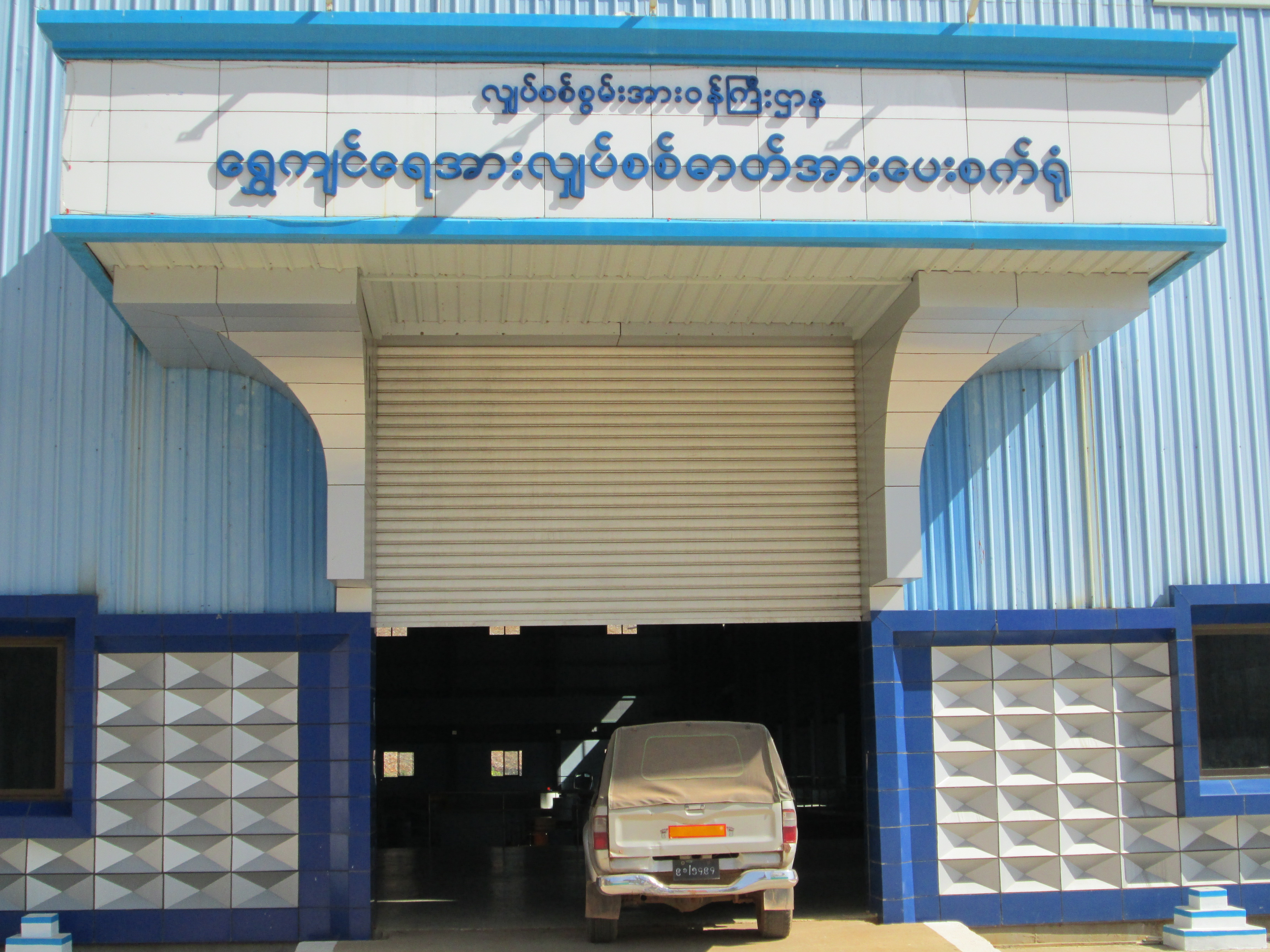

- Location within Myanmar
- Official name: Burmese: ရွှေကျင် တာတမံ
- Country: Myanmar
- Location: Shwegyin Township, Bago Region
- Coordinates: 17°58′15.60″N 96°56′09.79″E
- Purpose: Power
- Status: Operational
- Construction began: 2002
- Opening date: 2011; 15 years ago
- Owner: Ministry of Electric Power

Dam and spillways
- Type of dam: Embankment, rock-fill
- Impounds: Shwegyin River
- Height: 56.5 m (185 ft)

Reservoir
- Total capacity: 2,078×10^{6} m^{3} (1,685,000 acre⋅ft)
- Catchment area: 878 km^{2} (339 sq mi)

Power Station
- Commission date: 2010-2011
- Hydraulic head: 41.4 m (136 ft)
- Turbines: 4 x 18.75 MW (25,140 hp) Francis-type
- Installed capacity: 75 MW (101,000 hp)
- Annual generation: 262 GWh (940 TJ)

The Shwegyin Dam is a rock-fill dam on the Shwegyin River in Shwegyin Township of the Bago Region located in the southern central part of Burma. The primary purpose of the dam is hydroelectric power generation and it has a 75 megawatts (101,000 hp) power station just below its base. Construction on the dam began in 2002, the first generator was operational in December 2010 and it was formally opened on 22 October 2011. It is owned by the Ministry of Electric Power and cost US$161 million to construct.

== Gallery ==
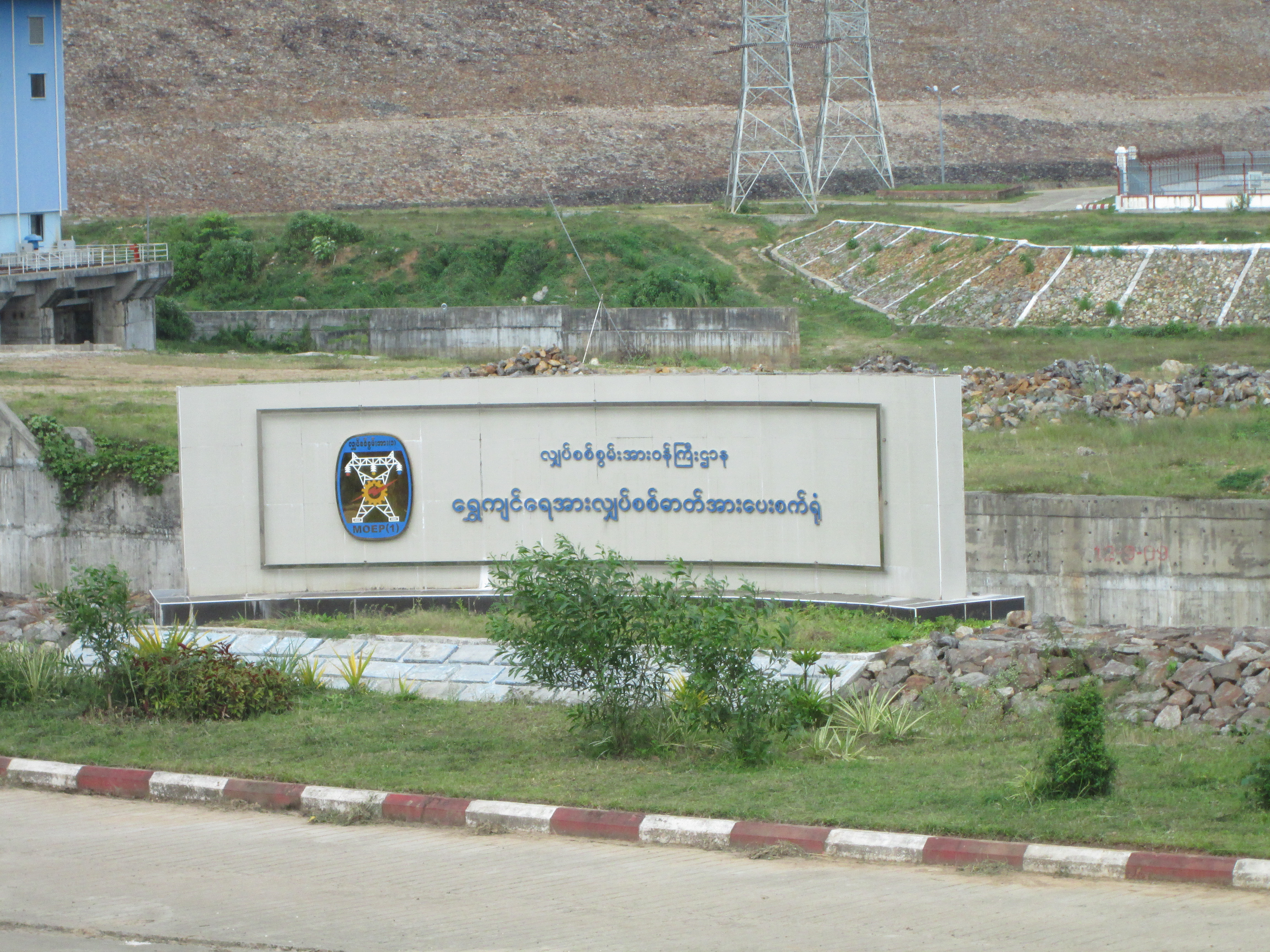
Powerhouse entrance

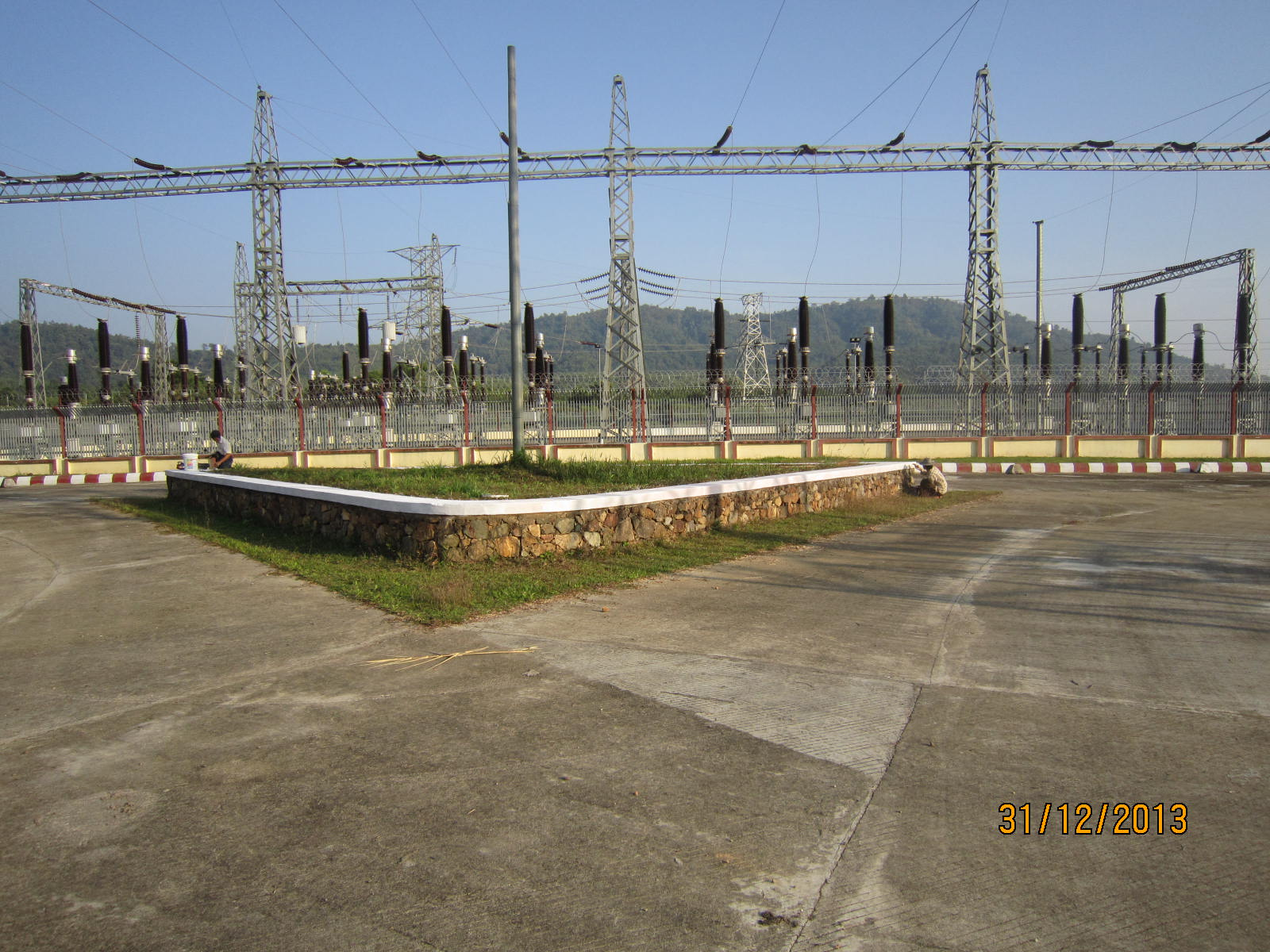
Switchyard

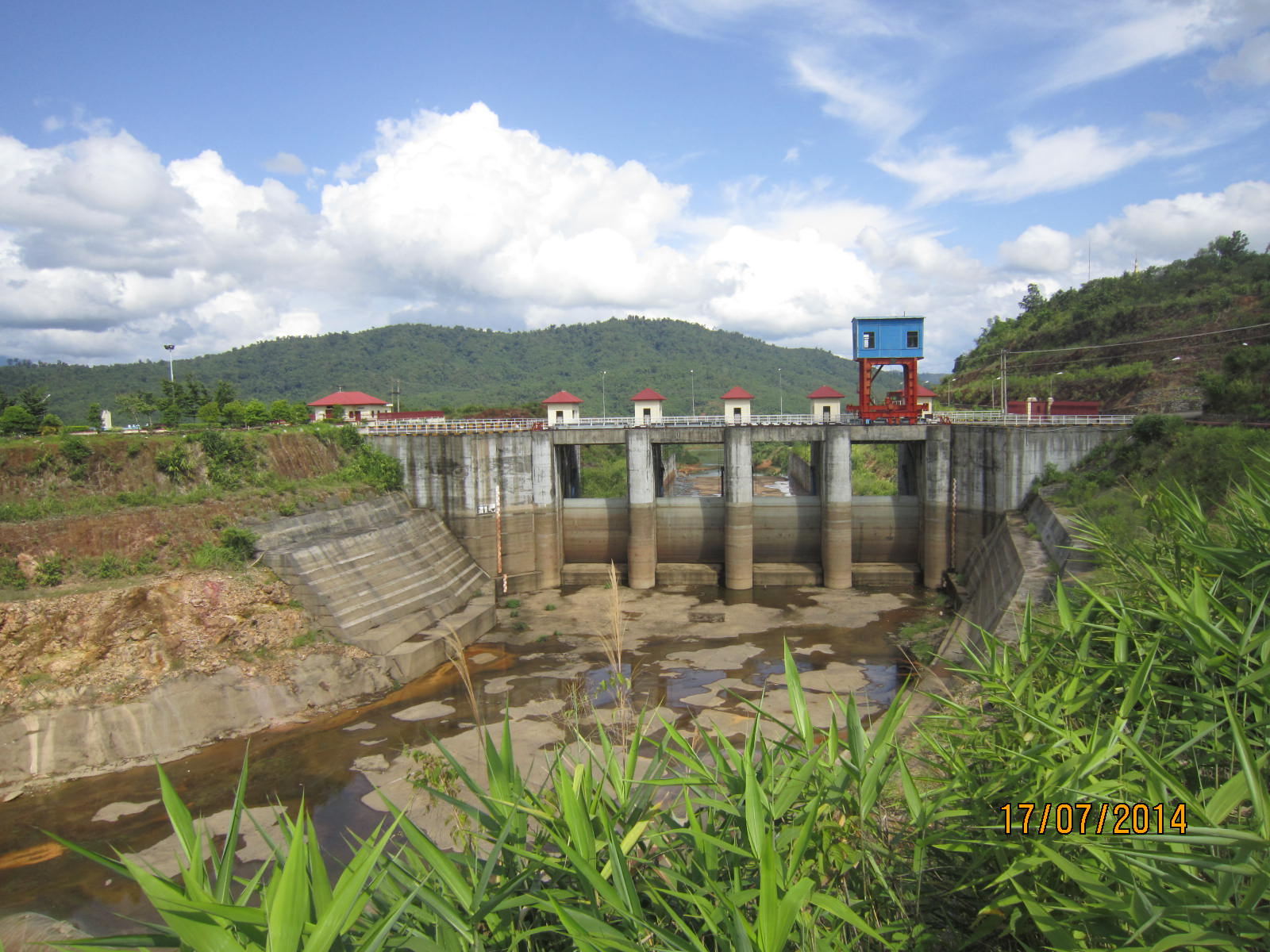
Spillway

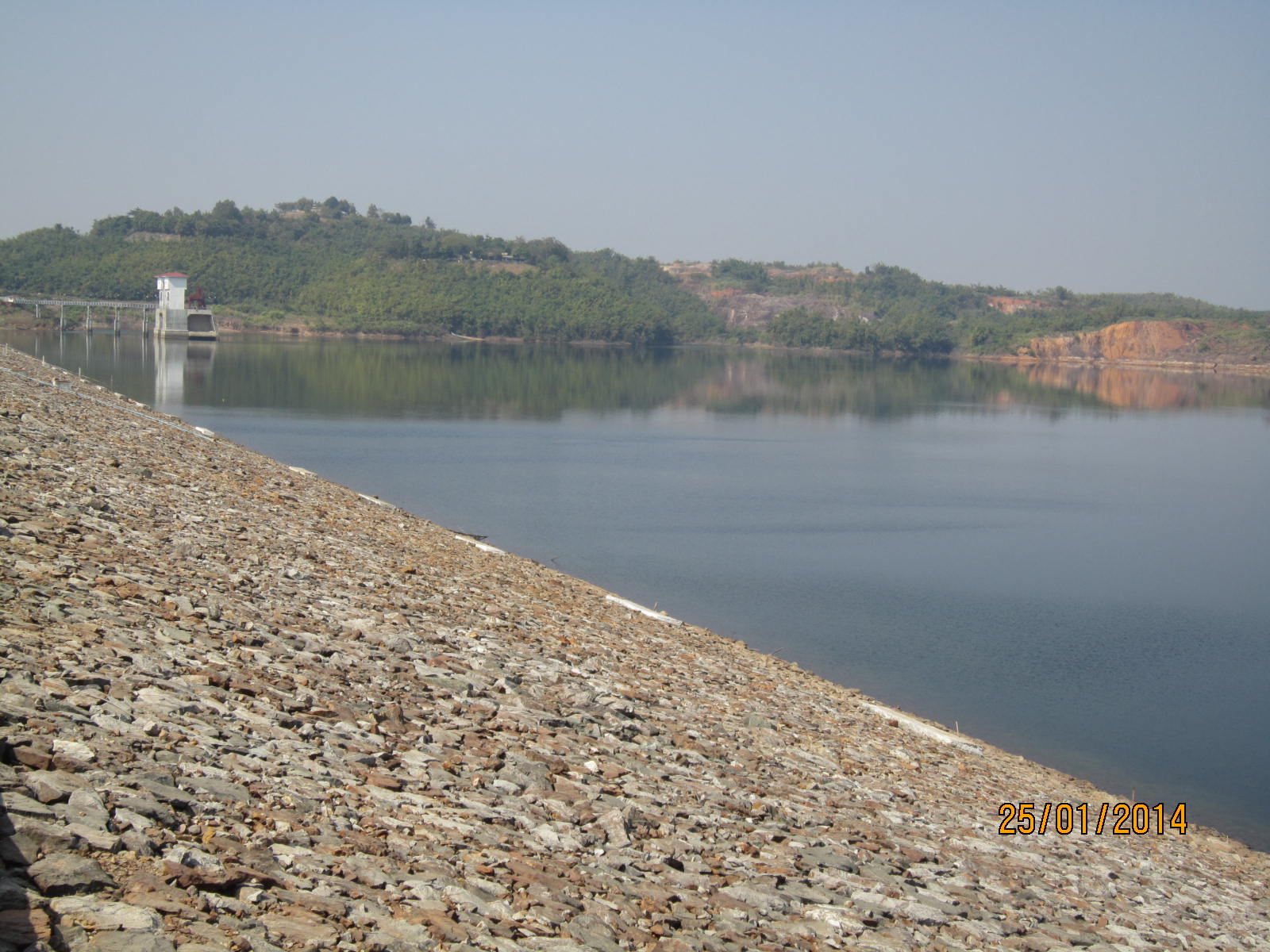
Dam

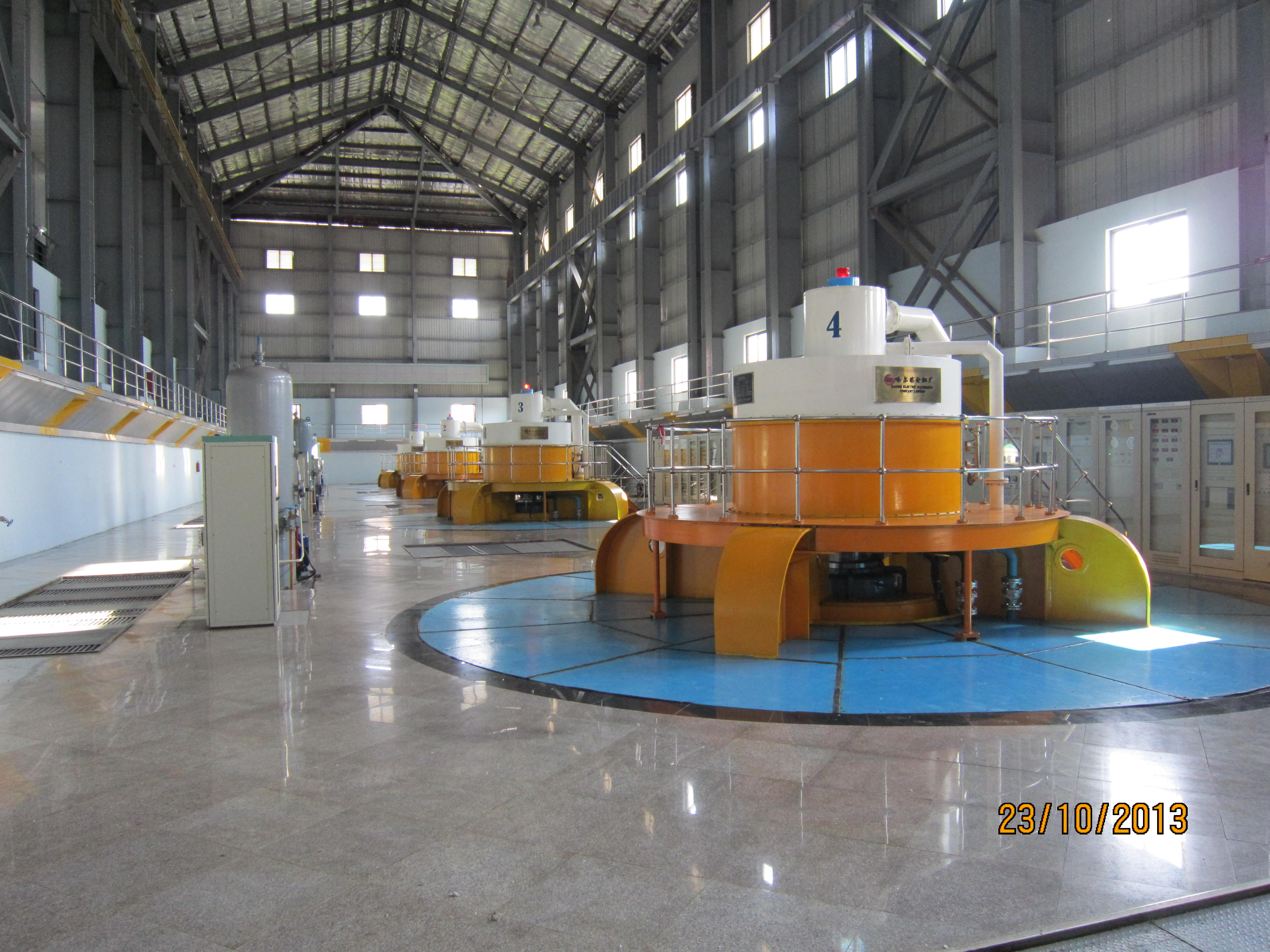
Turbines

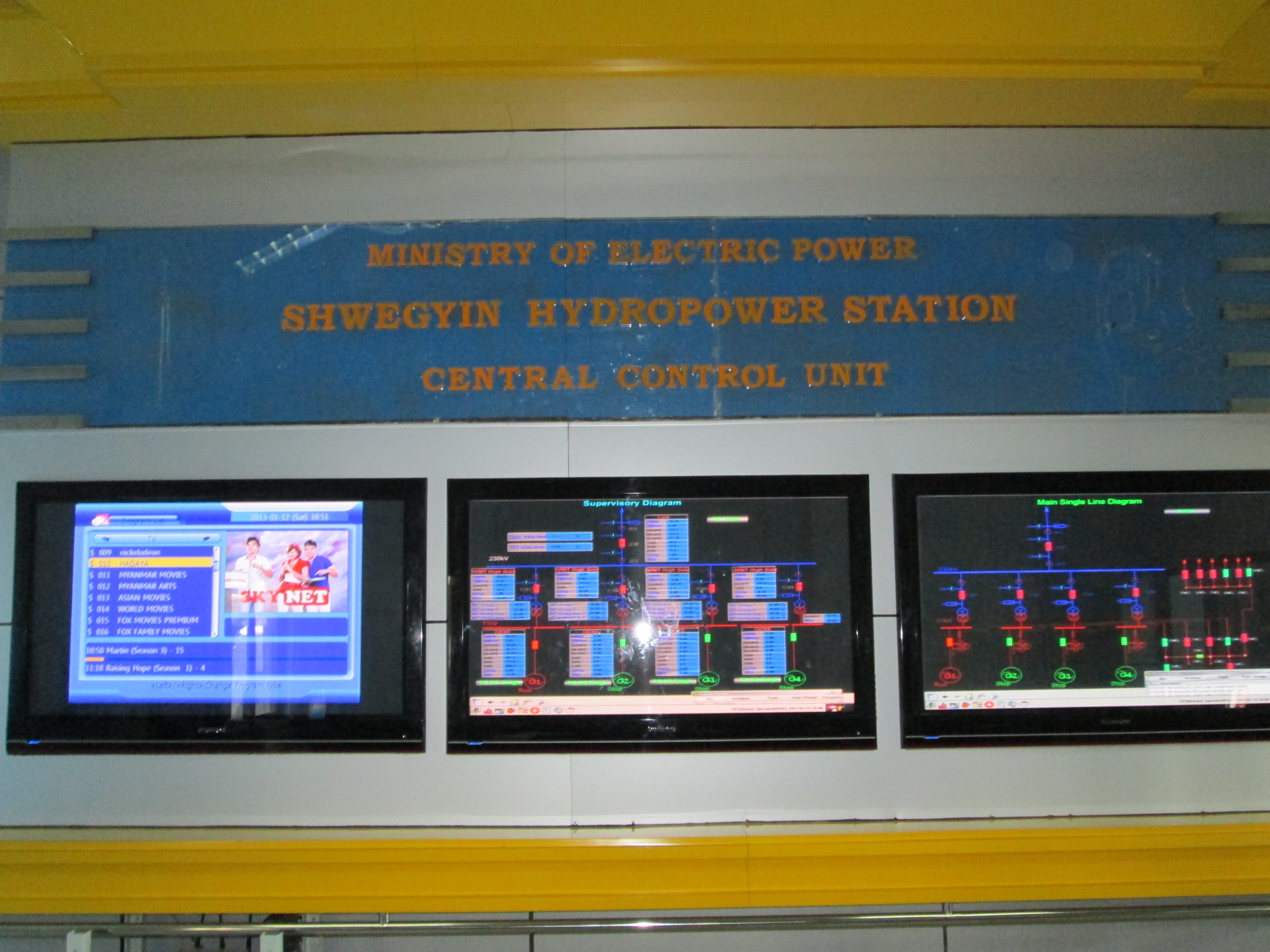
Central control room

== See also ==
- Dams in Burma
