= Zawgyi River =

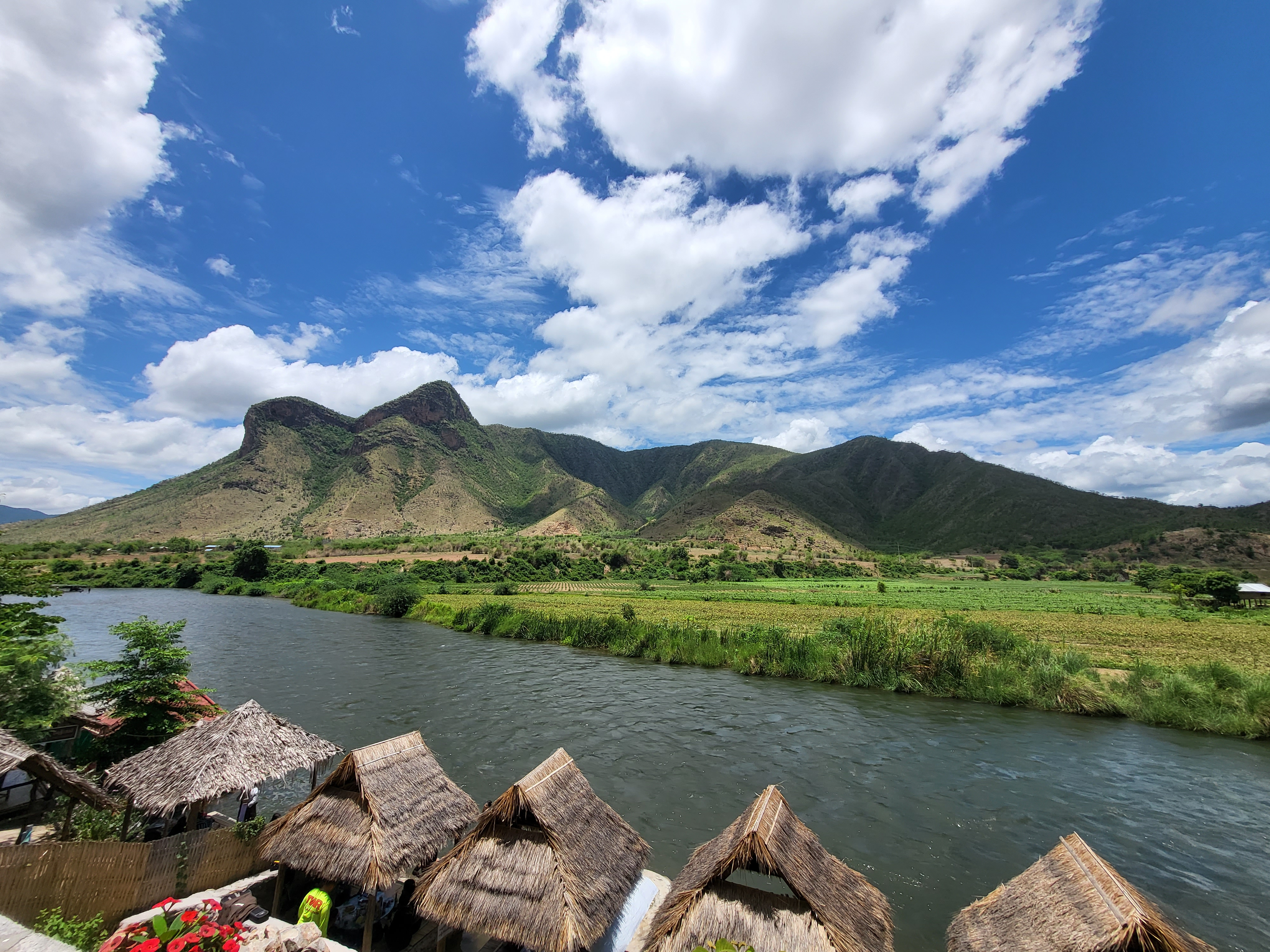
- Zawgyi river near Mandalay-Shan Border

- Location of mouth in Myanmar

Location
- Country: Myanmar

Physical characteristics
- Mouth
  - coordinates: 21°46′N 96°09′E

Basin features
- River system: Myitnge River

Zawgyi River (Burmese: ဇော်ဂျီမြစ်) is a river of eastern Burma (Myanmar). It flows through the foothills of the Shan Mountain range in Shan State. It is a tributary of the Myitnge River (Doktawaddy) entering it about 20 kilometres (12 mi) north of Kyaukse at Nyaungbintha.
