= Dapein River =

River in northern Myanmar

Coordinates: 24°17′40.9″N 97°13′12.6″E

The Dapein River is a river in northern Shan state of northern Myanmar.

== Description ==
The Dapein River is one of many tributaries of the Irrawaddy River. The source is from the mountainous regions of Yunnan, China.

The source comes at the convergence of two rivers in Xinchengxiang in Southwest Yunnan province China: the Binglang River and the Nandi River. The length of the river stretches a total of 117 kilometers.

== Dam ==
The River is host to two dams sponsored by the state owned China Datang Company and the government of Myanmar. Located in proximity to the border with China, the dams aim to provide energy from the river currents. Villagers were displaced moved to new locations to accommodate the construction of the dams and their associated reservoirs. Despite generation of power in Myanmar, most of the 513 kilowatt hours worth of energy, generated from June 2010 to June 2011, was sold for use in the electrical grid of Yunnan province in China.

The United Nations Framework Convention on Climate Change has approved a hydropower Clean Development Mechanism on the Dapein River in 2010 as a partnership between China and the Netherlands.

=== Dam 1 ===
The first dam has an estimated height of 83.5 meters. It has an installed capacity that can hold up to 240 megawatts of power. Annual production of energy can be up to 1,065 gigawatt hours of energy. This first dam was completed in 2005, filling a reservoir.

=== Dam 2 ===
The second dam is 50 kilometers distance from the first dam. It has an installed capacity that can hold up to 165 megawatts of power. Annual production of energy can be up to a total 775 gigawatt hours of energy. This second dam was completed in 2006, filling a big reservoir.

The two dams were reportedly to cost 108 million yuan ($16,944,984 in 2012 USD) with $90 production to be sold to Chinese companies with the rest given to people.

=== Security ===
The projects were plagued with problems. The Kachin Independence Organization broke a 17-year cease-fire to fight and to discourage construction of dams.
