= Shweli I Dam =

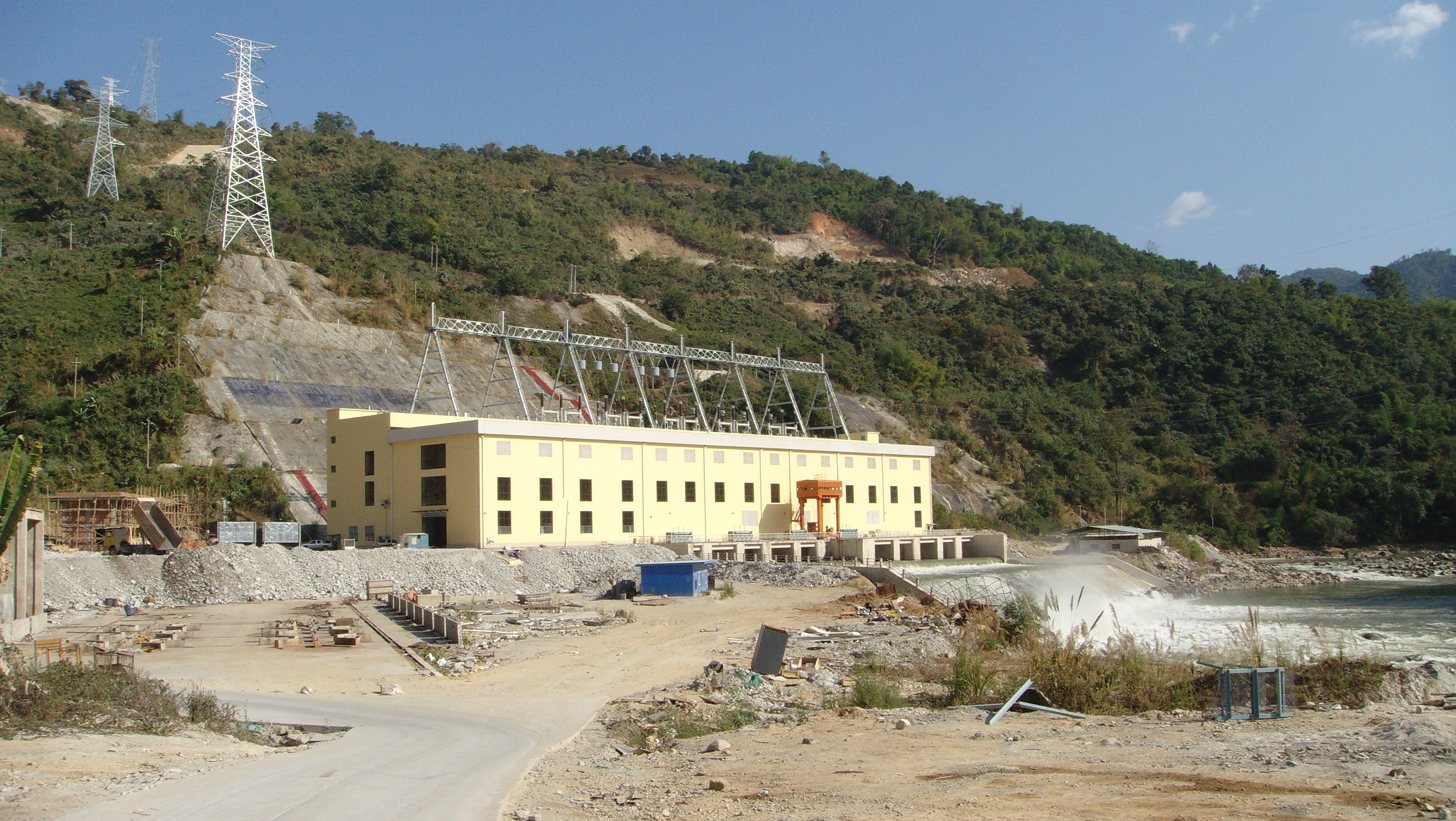
- The power station

- Location within Myanmar
- Country: Burma
- Location: Namhkam, Shan State
- Coordinates: 23°41′56.40″N 97°30′23.12″E
- Purpose: Power
- Status: Operational
- Construction began: 2002
- Opening date: 2008
- Construction cost: US$756.2 million
- Owner: Shweli River-I Power Station Co.

Dam and spillways
- Type of dam: Gravity
- Impounds: Shweli River
- Height: 47 m (154 ft)
- Length: 177 m (581 ft)

Reservoir
- Total capacity: 24.11×10^{6} m^{3} (19,550 acre⋅ft)

Shweli I Power Station
- Coordinates: 23°40′05.42″N 97°27′22.12″E
- Commission date: 2008-2009
- Type: Conventional, diversion
- Hydraulic head: 299 m (981 ft)
- Turbines: 6 x 100 MW (130,000 hp) Francis-type
- Installed capacity: 600 MW (800,000 hp)
- Annual generation: 4,022 GWh (14,480 TJ)

The Shweli I Dam is a gravity dam on the Shweli River about 23 kilometres (14 mi) southwest of Namhkam in Shan State, Burma. The primary purpose of the dam is hydroelectric power generation and it supports a 600 megawatts (800,000 hp) power station. Water from the dam's reservoir is diverted through a 5.1 kilometres (3.2 mi) long headrace tunnel to the power station downstream. The drop in elevation affords a hydraulic head of 299 metres (981 ft). Construction on the dam began in 2002 and the river was diverted on 10 December 2006. On 5 September 2008, the first generator was commissioned and the last of the six was commissioned in April 2009. The dam and the power station were constructed under the build–operate–transfer method and cost US$756.2 million. It is owned and operated by the Shweli River-I Power Station Co. The Shweli II and Shweli III Dams are planned downstream.

== Gallery ==
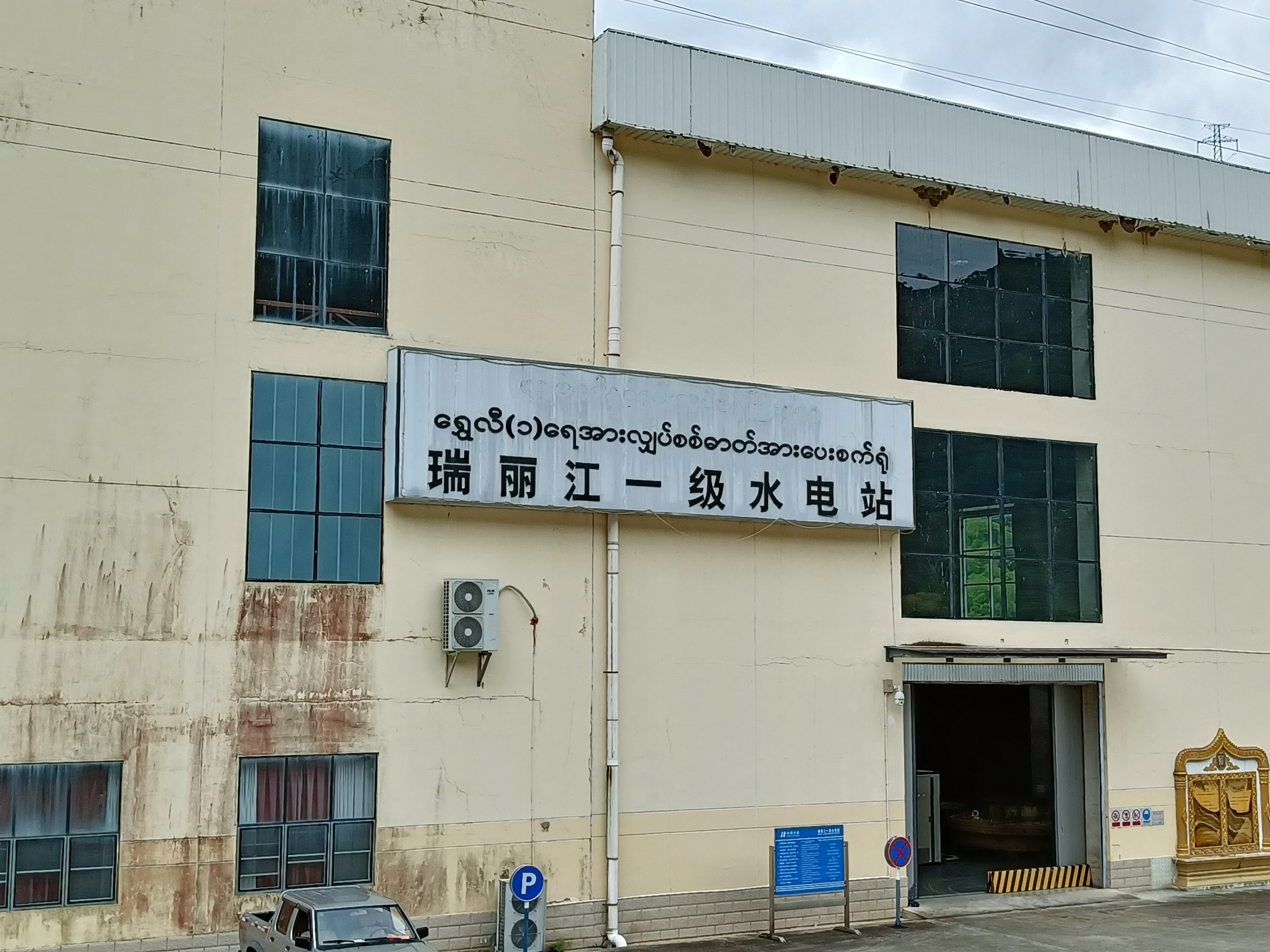
Power house

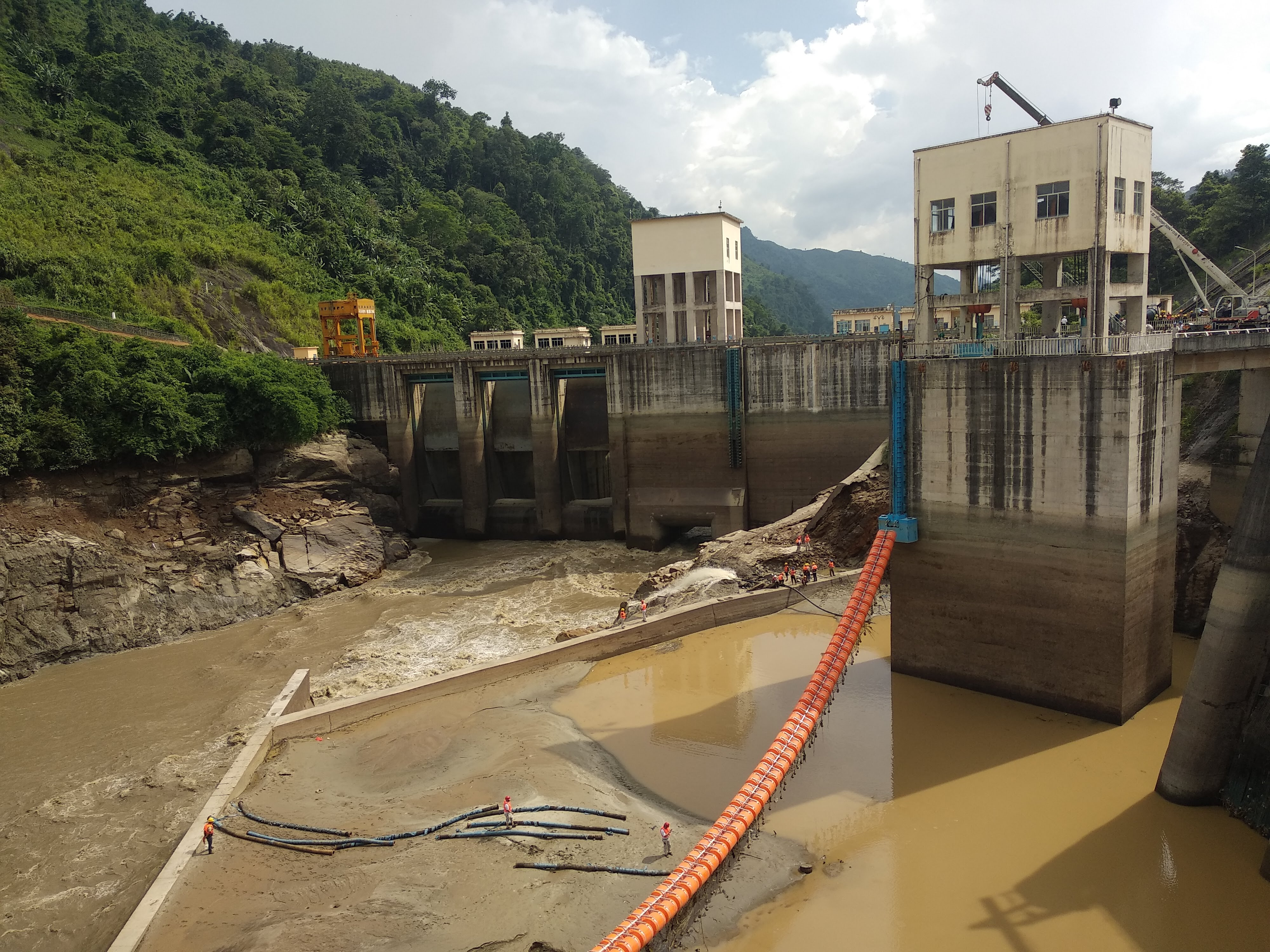
Spillway

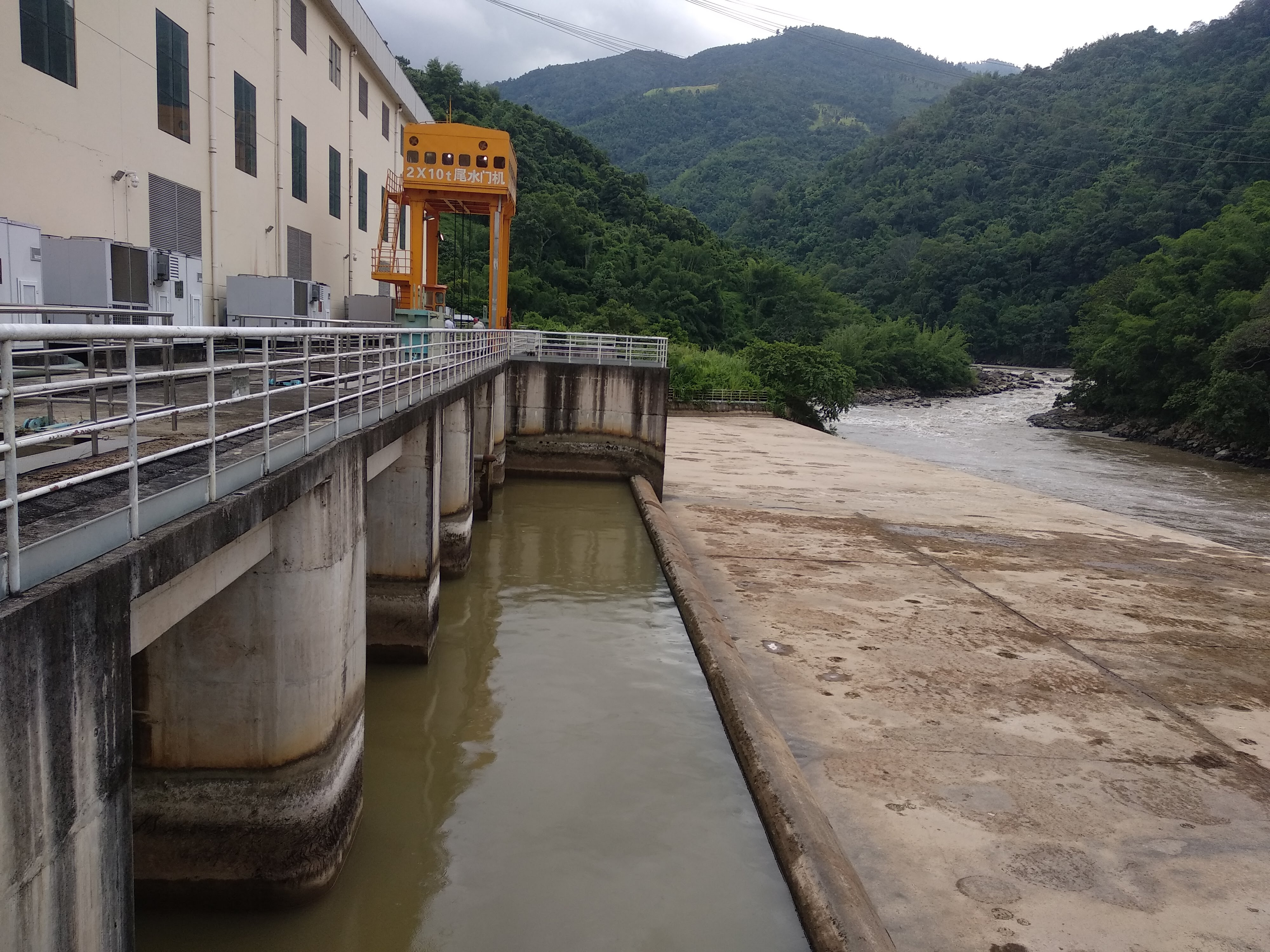
Tailrace gate

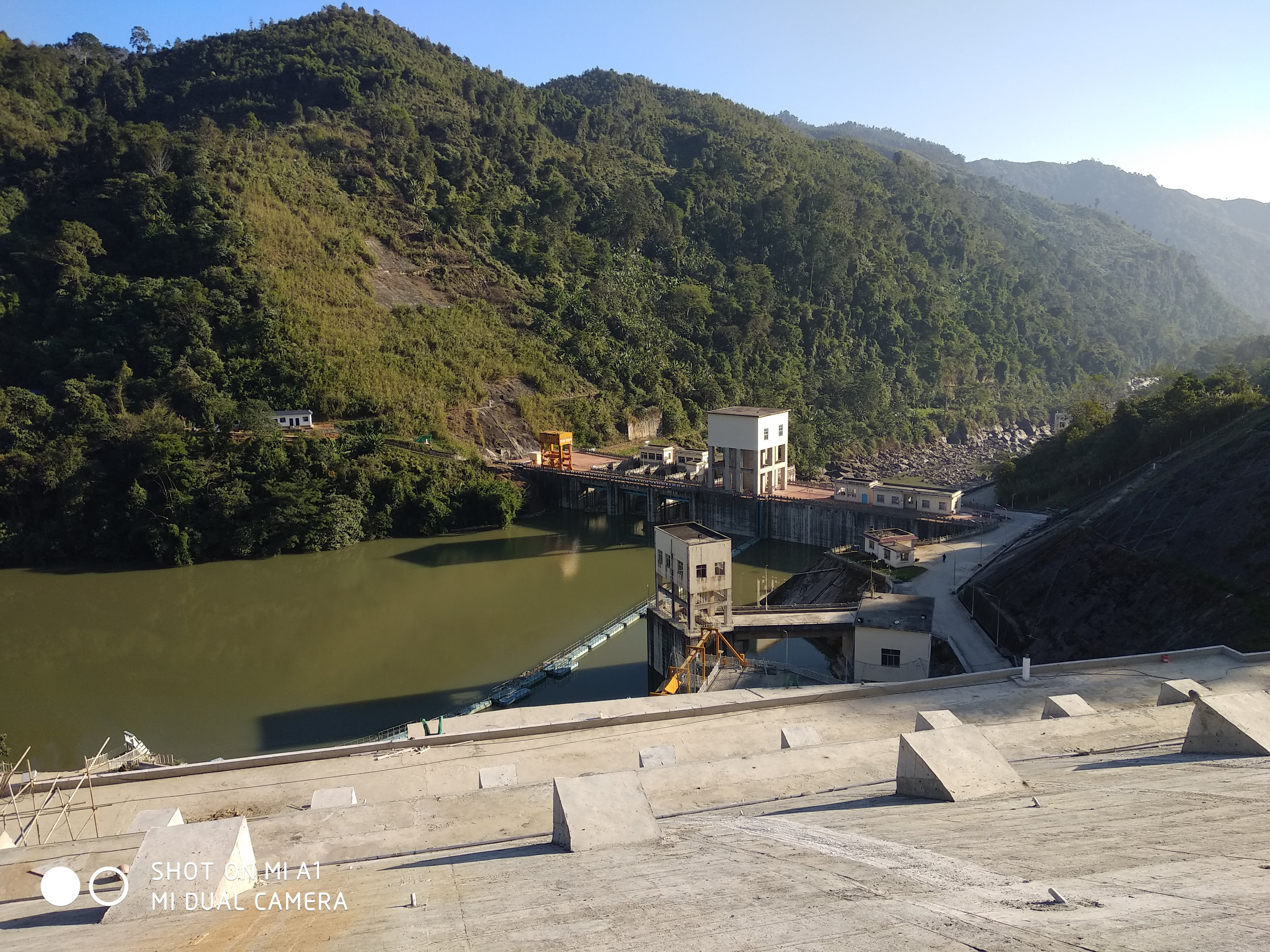
Dam

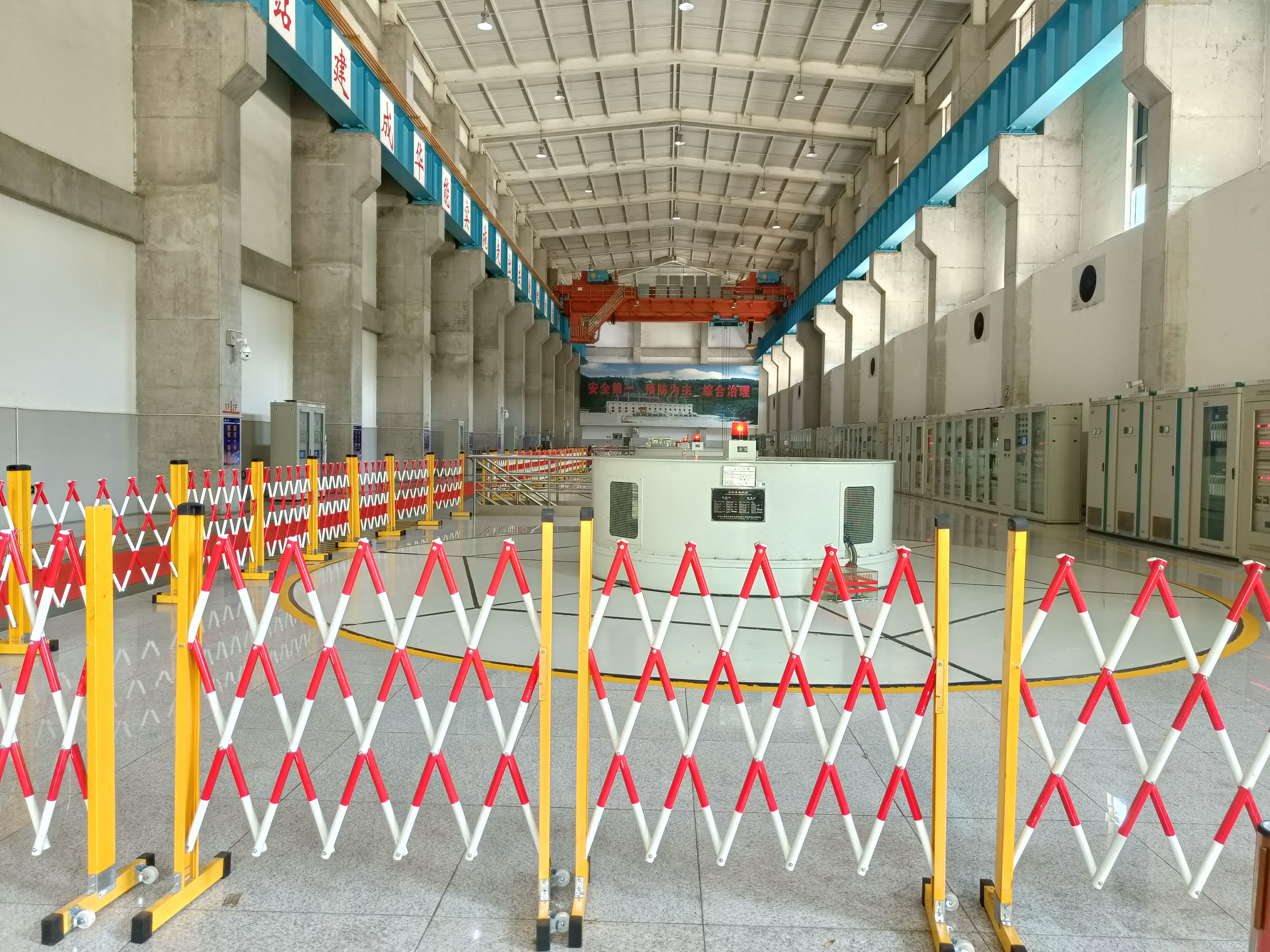
Turbines

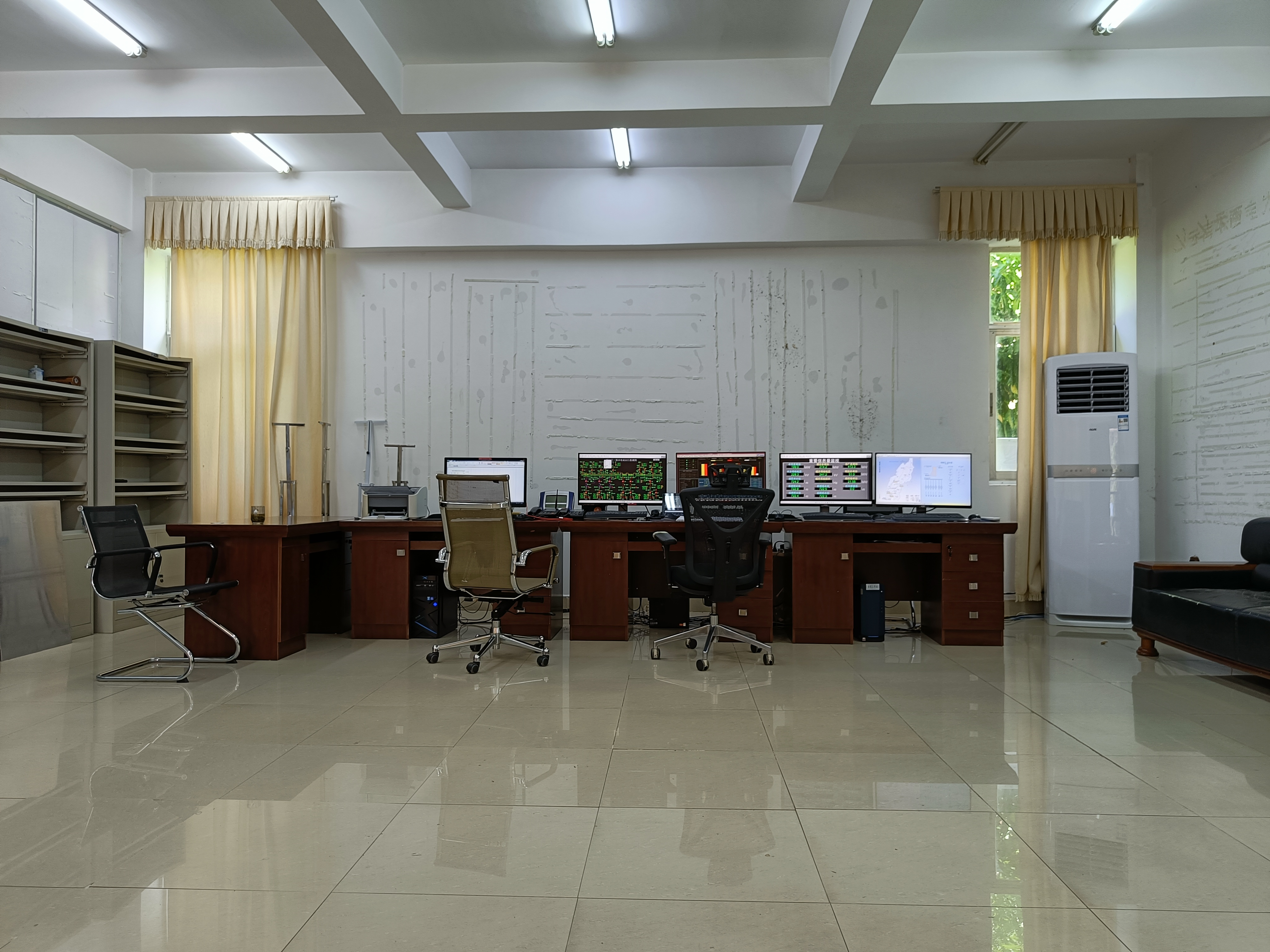
Central Control room

== See also ==
- Dams in Burma
- List of power stations in Burma
