= Yeywa Dam =

Hydropower station in Myanmar

Yeywa Hydropower Station
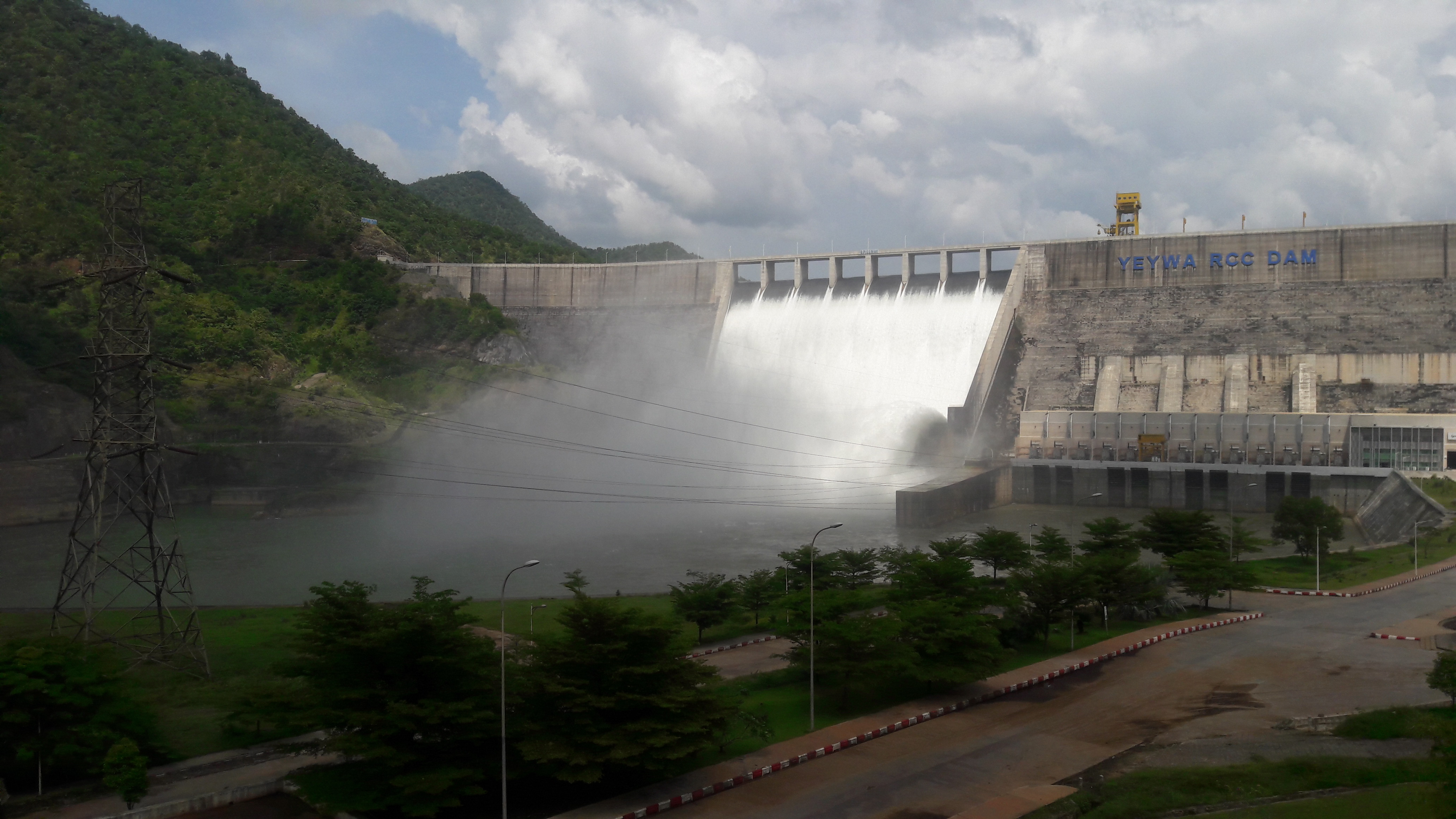
- Yeywa Dam

- Location within Myanmar
- Official name: Burmese: ရဲရွာရေအားလျှပ်စစ်ဓာတ်အားပေးစက်ရုံ
- Location: Mandalay Region, Kyaukse District Kyaukse Township, near Yeyaman village, Myanmar (52 km or 32 mi from Mandalay)
- Coordinates: 21°40′22″N 96°28′25″E
- Construction began: 2001-2002
- Opening date: 2010
- Construction cost: US$700 million Designed by Colenco Power Engineering Ltd. (Switzerland)
- Owners: Department of Hydropower, Ministry of Electricity and Energy (Myanmar)

Dam and spillways
- Type of dam: Gravity, roller-compacted concrete
- Impounds: Myitnge River, a tributary of the Ayeyarwady River
- Height: 134 m (440 ft)
- Length: 690 m (2,260 ft)
- Spillway type: ungated spillway 157 m (515 ft) crest width 136 m (446 ft) net width
- Spillway capacity: design flood: 6,600 m^{3}/s (5.4 acre⋅ft/s)

Reservoir
- Total capacity: 2.6 billion m^{3} (9.82 Tmcft) gross storage 1.6 billion m^{3} (56.5 Tmcft) active storage
- Catchment area: 10,890 sq mi (28,200 km^{2})
- Surface area: 14,580 acres (59.0 km^{2})
- Maximum water depth: >180 m (590.6 ft)

Power Station
- Operator: Myanmar Electric Power Enterprise
- Commission date: 2010
- Turbines: 4 x 197.5 MW (264,900 hp) Francis-type
- Installed capacity: 790 MW (1,060,000 hp)
- Annual generation: 3,550 GWh (12,800 TJ)
- Website; Yeywa Dam

The Yeywa Hydropower Station (Burmese: ရဲရွာရေအားလျှပ်စစ်ဓာတ်အားပေးစက်ရုံ), located on the Myitnge River, 52 kilometres (32 mi) southeast of Mandalay city, at Yeywa village in Kyaukse Township, Mandalay Region in central Myanmar, is the country's first roller-compacted concrete (RCC) dam, and the site of a 790-megawatt (1,060,000 hp) hydroelectric power plant, the largest in the country.

== Background ==
In 1999, the feasibility study of the plant was completed. In May 2001, an agreement was signed for consulting services between MEPE and COLENCO Power Engineering, Ltd. In 2003, an agreement part 2 was signed for the Detail Design, preparation of tender documents and guidance services for construction supervision was signed. The river diversion was completed on December 12, 2004, and RCC placement began on February 8, 2006. The Burmese government announced plans for the Yeywa Dam in late 2001. In 2004, Burma's Ministry of Electric Power (MEPE) signed a Memorandum of understanding with a consortium of Chinese companies created by China International Trust & Investment Co. (CITIC) and Sinohydro Corporation for the implementation of the project. On 2 September 2005, a ceremony to mark the signing of a contract between the Hydroelectric Power Department under the Ministry of Electric Power and the China National Heavy Machinery Corporation (CHMC) for the Yeywa Hydroelectric Power Project was held in Yangon [Rangoon]. Site work began in 2004, and all four generators were commissioned in 2010. The project was completed in November 2011.

== Design ==
The dam design comprises a 137 metres (449 ft) high RCC embankment gravity dam, built of 2,800,000 cubic metres (99,000,000 cu ft) of concrete. The dam includes an ungated spillway of reinforced conventional concrete cast after RCC placement, located in the central section of the dam for a design flood water discharge of 6,600 cubic metres per second (230,000 cu ft/s). The 448-foot (137 m) wide spillway consists of eight 56-foot (17 m) wide and 39-foot (12 m) high outlets.

There is a 790 MW (4 × 197.5 MW) powerhouse at the toe of the dam on the south bank of the river. The powerhouse, which contains the turbines and generators, is 510 feet (160 m) long, 148 feet (45 m) wide, and 197 feet (60 m) high. The powerhouse and dam structures are designed to withstand earthquakes of up to eight on the Richter scale.

The power generation facilities consist of four water intakes, each consisting of 22-foot (6.7 m) diameter and 492-foot (150 m) long high-tensile steel pipe penstocks and four vertical-axis Francis turbines and generator units, alongside associated electro-mechanical and auxiliary equipment installed in an open-air powerhouse. Four water intake towers were constructed as conventional reinforced concrete structures abutting the upstream (east) face of the RCC dam. This enabled the contractor to construct the towers above the penstock inlets before the start of RCC construction in order to minimise interference with the RCC construction activity.

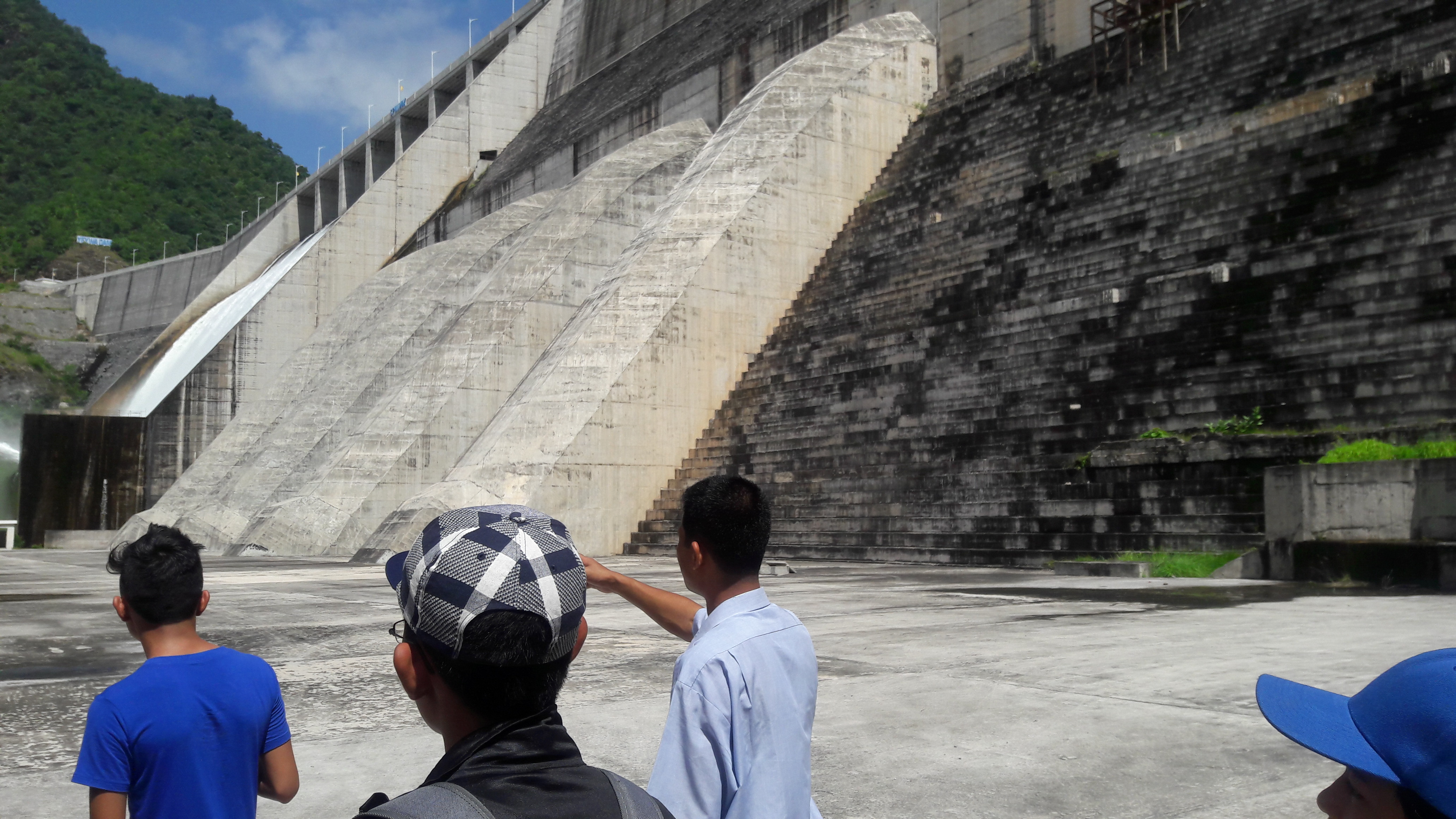
Four water intake

There is one permanent 10-metre (33 ft) diameter, 450-metre (1,480 ft) long, diversion tunnel in the north river bank serving as a bottom outlet. This outlet tunnel enables reservoir drawdown and control during reservoir filling, maintenance of downstream riparian river flow during the impounding period, and, together with the spillway, serves to redirect floodwaters of the Myitnge river and maintain river flow during an emergency when all turbines are closed down.

Two double-circuit 230 kV transmission lines connect the main transformers located on the downstream side of the powerhouse to an open-air switchyard, located on the south river bank 550 metres (1,800 ft) downstream of the powerhouse. The Yeywa Dam will supply electric power to the Meiktila Sub-Power Station through the 110 kilometres (68 mi) long Yeywa-Meiktila 230 kV double power line link to the southwest and to the Bellin Substation through another 50 kilometres (31 mi) long 230 kV double power line link in the west. The Bellin and the Meiktila Sub-Power Stations will be linked to each other with 100 km long 23 kV double power lines. US$45.8 million worth of 230 KVA cables and equipment were used for the construction and linking of these sub-power stations.

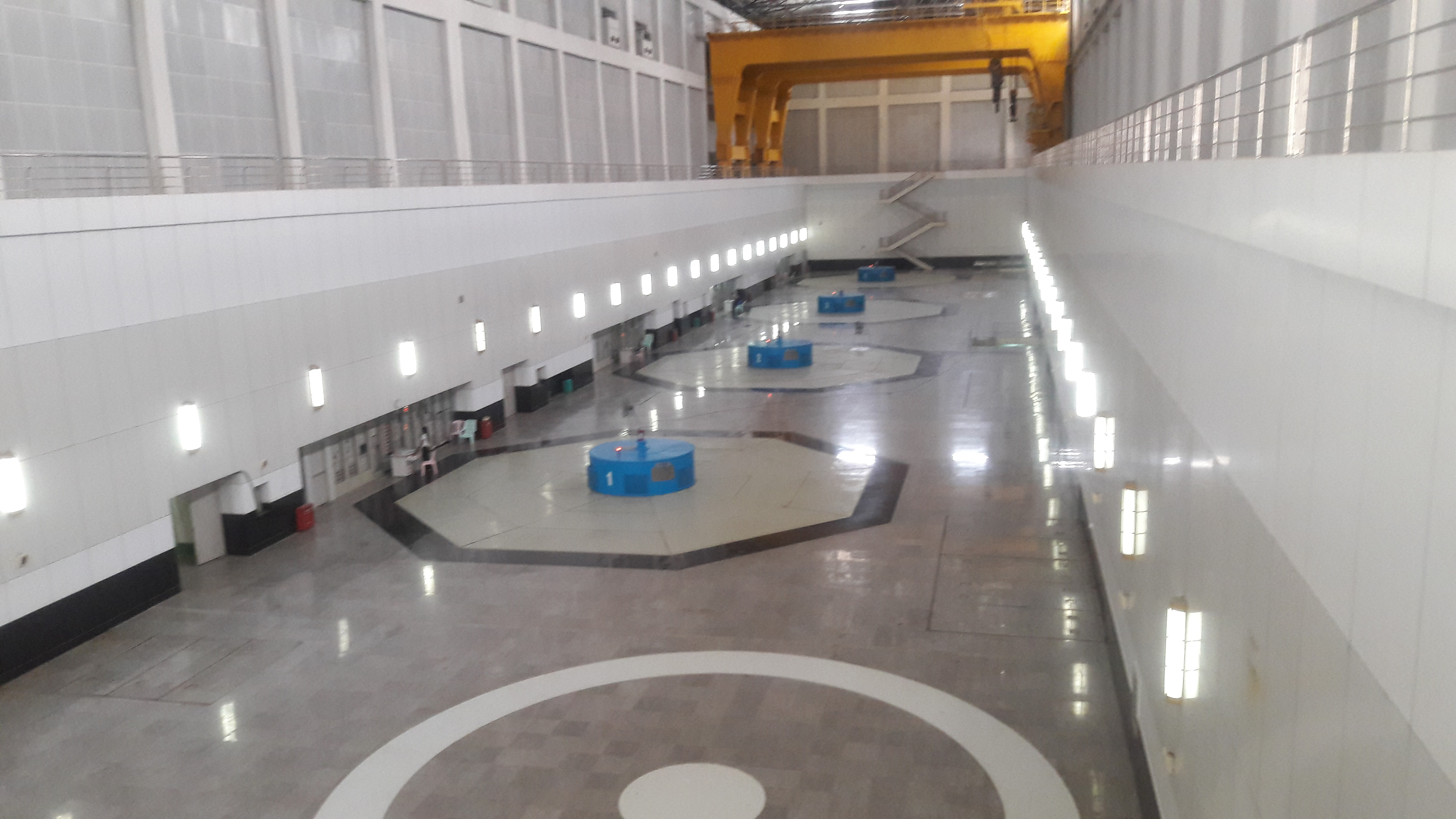
Inside the generation house

== Construction ==
Several construction companies from China, Switzerland, Britain, and Myanmar have been involved in various stages of the Yeywa Dam, including the Chinese companies: Export–Import Bank of China (China Exim Bank), China Gezhouba Group Co. (CGGC), China National Electric Equipment Co., Hunan Savoo Overseas Water & Electric Engineering Co., and China National Heavy Machinery Co. The Swiss company Colenco Power Engineering, the German-based company Voith Siemens, and the British Malcolm Dunstan & Associates.

A key aspect in the successful construction of the Yeywa RCC dam was the comprehensive training of the local staff during preparation for and the initial stages of the construction. High-Tech Concrete Technologies (HTCT), a member of Shwe Taung Group, was the one who has been transferring the knowledge from a local perspective. Up to 5,000 workers were employed on this large construction project. Equipment selected for the concreting operations includes Putzmeister's MX 32 stationary boom, an M 38 truck-mounted concrete pump, and two BSA 2,109 HP stationary pumps.

A bridge was built across the river, just downstream of the dam, to replace the ferry system, which had been the only means of transport across the river.

Various studies were conducted during construction, and identified risk factors, one of which was "Key Organizational Risk Factors: A Case Study of Hydroelectric Power Projects in Myanmar."

== Impact ==
3,550 gigawatt-hours (12,800 TJ) of electricity per year will be supplied to the Mandalay Division regional power grid for public and private consumption.

In 2005, the Myanmar Times reported that three villages near the dam had been relocated. The villagers had depended on the Myitnge River for their fishing, farming, and logging livelihoods, the sources of which will be flooded by the dam. Ancient cultural sites like the Sappa Sukha Htattaw Temple will also be flooded and forever lost.

== See also ==
- Dams in Burma
- List of power stations in Burma

== External sources ==
External images
- Earlier works at Yeywa showing overtopping of Stage 1 and 2 (July 2006), photo
- Earlier works at Yeywa before completion of integrated cofferdam (April 2007), photo
- Yeywa RCC dam under construction (January 2008), photo
- Yeywa Hydro Power Project, video 6:03
