= Myitnge River =

Myitnge / Nam Tu မြစ်ငယ်
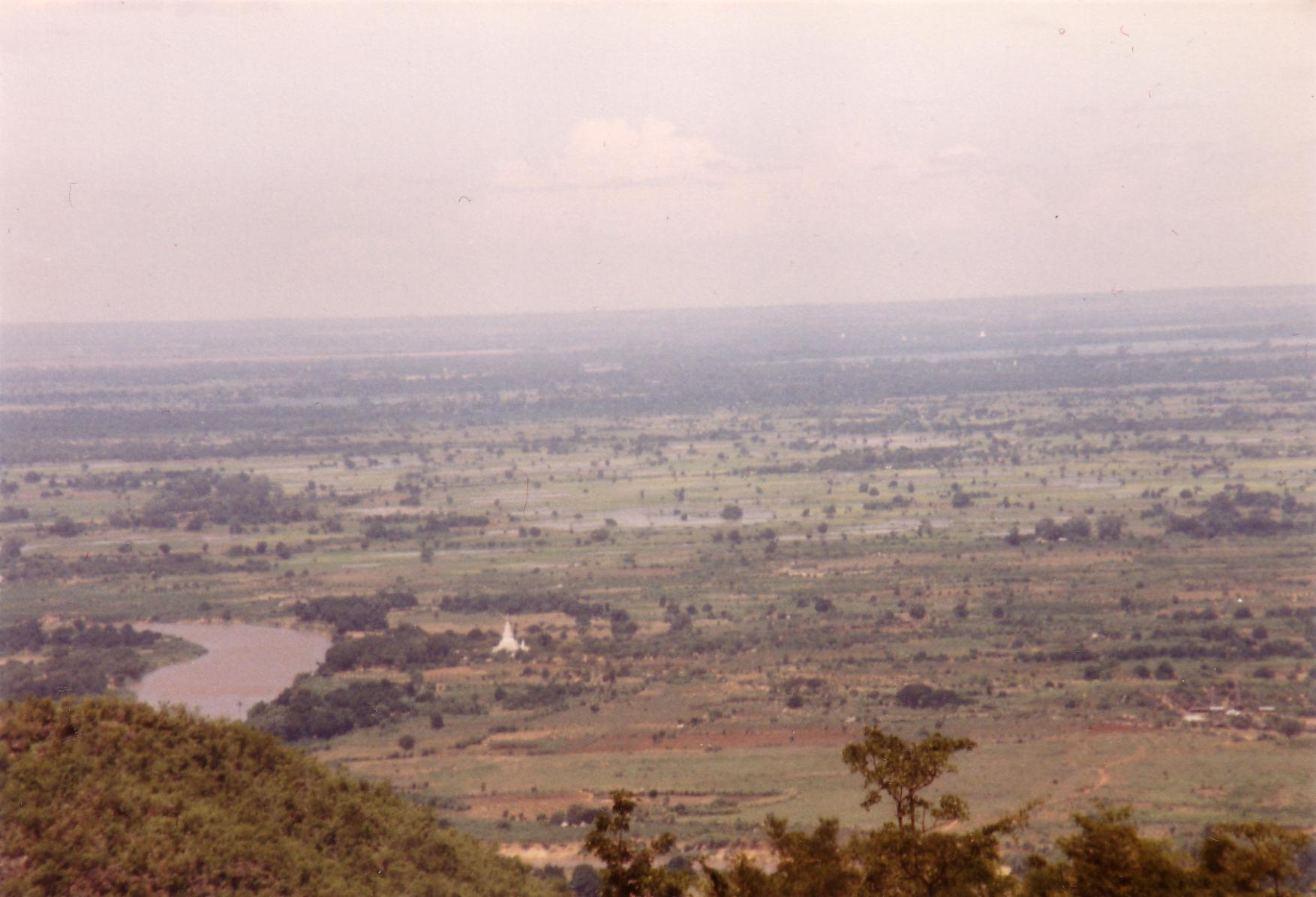
- River Myitnge and Shwe Sar Yan Pagoda from Maymyo Road overlooking the Mandalay Plain.

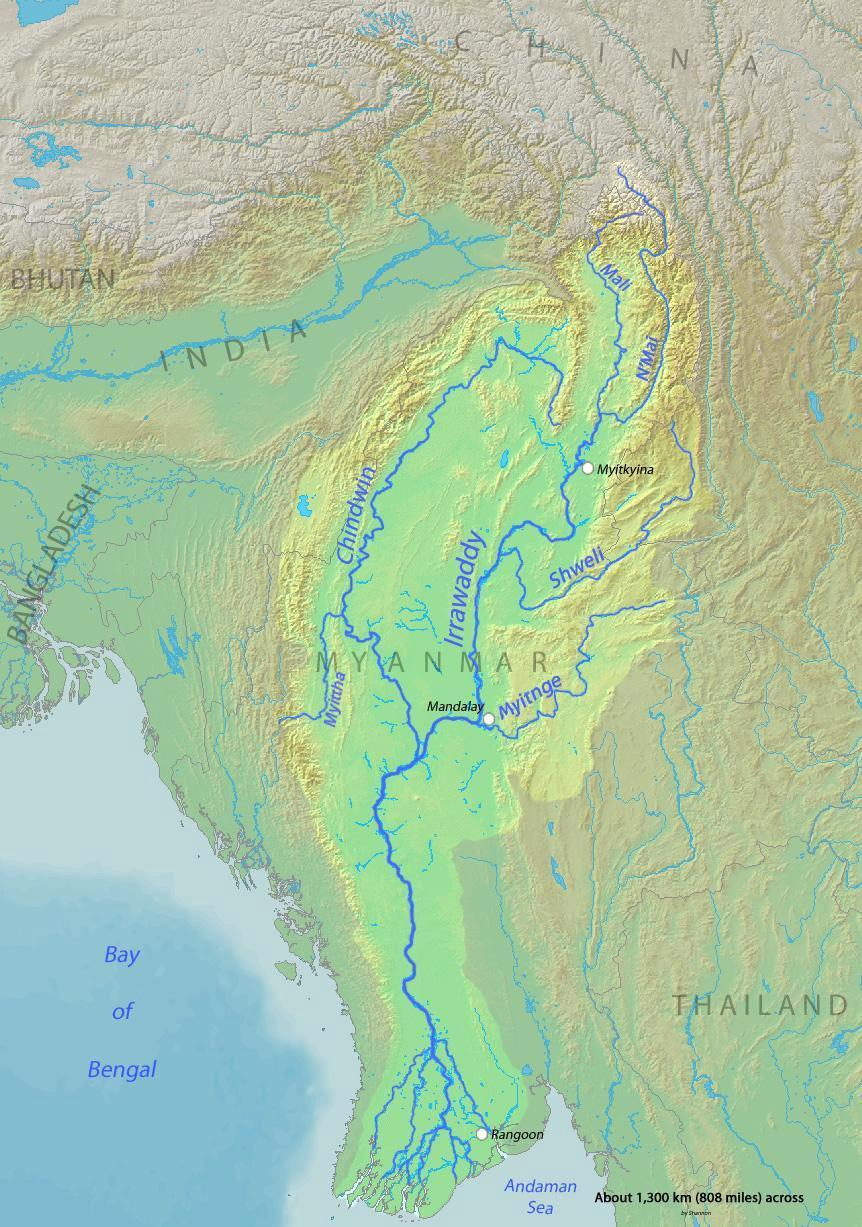

Location
- Country: Burma

Physical characteristics
- Source
  - location: China
- Mouth
  - location: Ayeyarwady River
  - coordinates: 21°51′49″N 95°59′28″E
  - elevation: 64 m (210 ft)
- Length: 528 km (328 mi)
- Basin size: 47,023.1 km^{2} (18,155.7 sq mi)
- Discharge
  - location: Near mouth
  - average: 723.6 m^{3}/s (25,550 cu ft/s)

Myitnge River (Burmese: မြစ်ငယ် or Nam Tu, also known as Dokhtawaddy River (ဒုဋ္ဌဝတီမြစ်), is a major tributary of Ayeyarwady River (Irrawaddy) in Myanmar (Burma). The name Myitnge in Burmese and Dokhtawaddy in Pali both mean "little river", by contrast with the Ayeyarwady or "big river".

== Source, course and outflow ==
The river rises on the Irrawaddy-Salween watershed, not far from the latter river, and flows westwards through northern Shan Plateau of eastern Burma where it is known as Namtu River, and eventually into the Ayeyarwady at Amarapura. The old capital of the Ava Kingdom was built between its two branches, Myittha River which it gives off to the west and the eastern stream which retains the name Myitnge before it enters the Irrawaddy.

== Tributaries ==
1. Zawgyi River enters the Myitnge about 20 km north of Kyaukse at Nyaungbintha.
2. Panlaung River enters near Ava.

== Towns ==
1. Namtu
2. Hsenwi
3. Hsipaw

== History ==
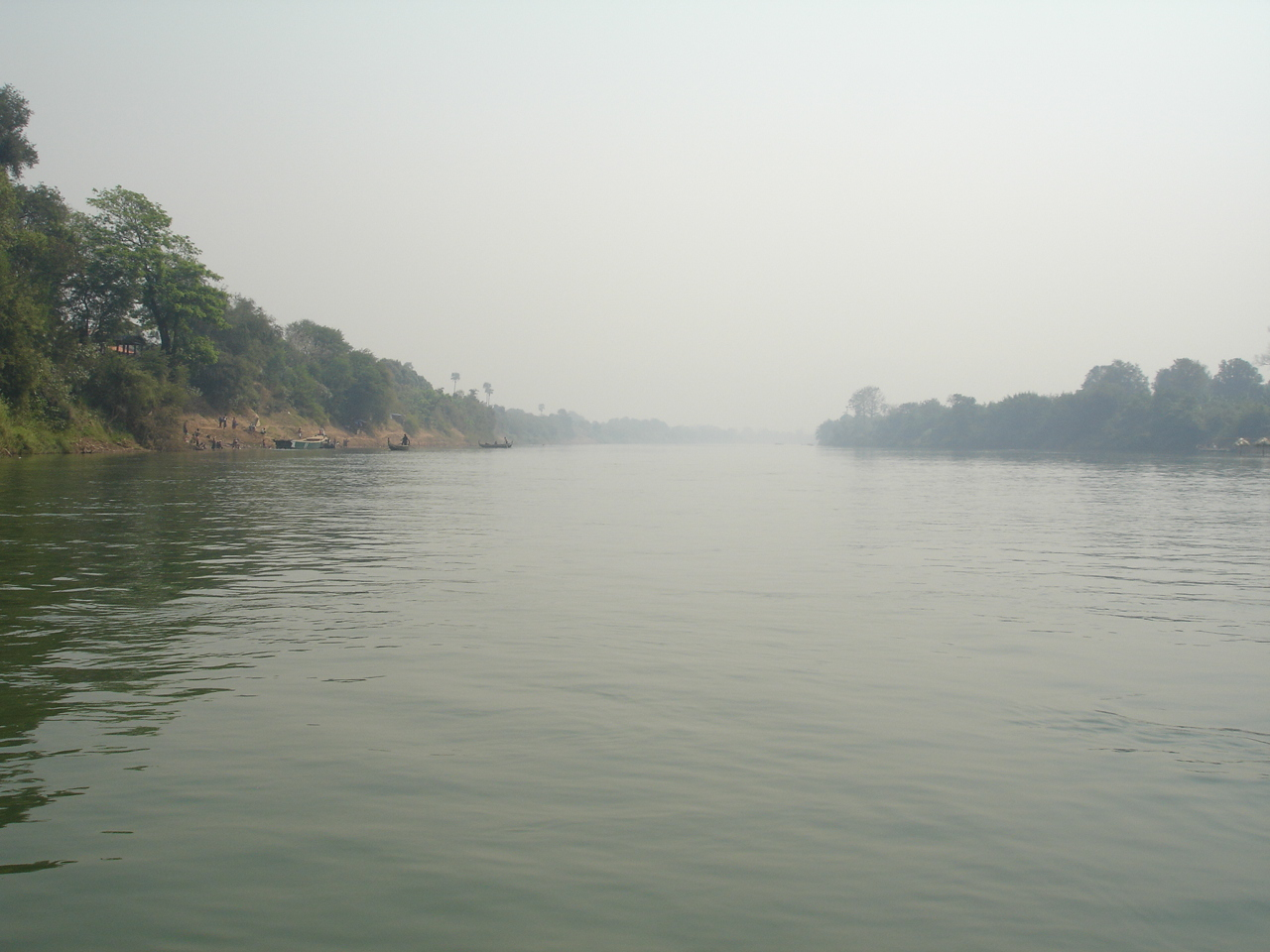
River Myitnge at Shwe Sar Yan

The famous Shwe Sar Yan Pagoda on its north bank, built in 1053 by the Shan princess Sao Mon Hla on her journey home after wedding and later leaving King Anawrahta (1044–1077) of Bagan in central Burma, holds its annual festival starting just before the full moon of Tabaung (March). Anawrahta constructed an irrigation system consisting of weirs and canals on the Panlaung and the Zawgyi rivers but found the Myitnge too wild to tame. Three centuries later Thado Minbya (1364–67) built Ava as his capital at the confluence of Myitnge and Ayeyarwady rivers within easy reach of the rice granary at Kyaukse.

== Bridges ==
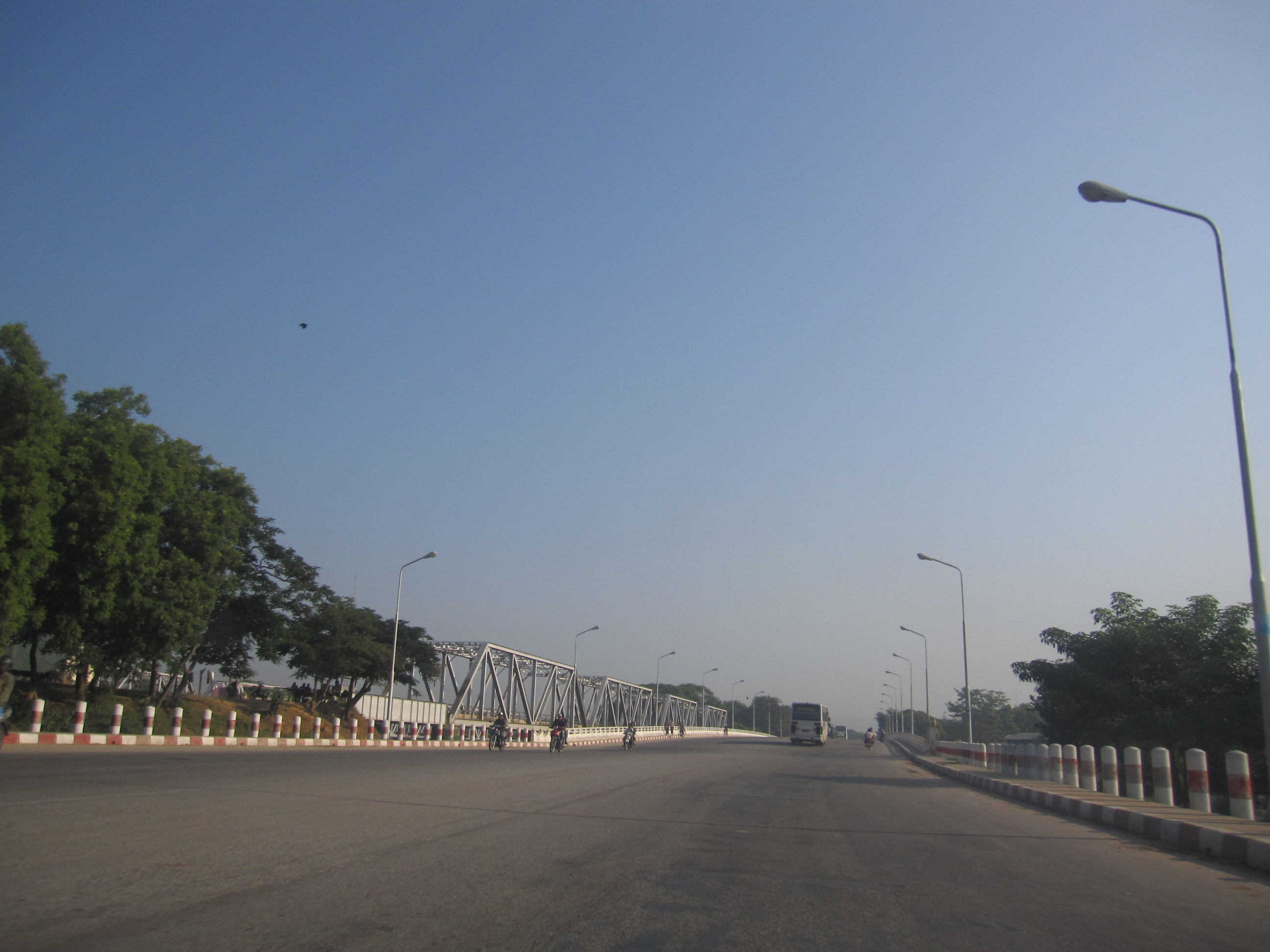
Myitnge Bridge to Mandalay

During the Second World War starting from New Year Day 1943 through to late April, several bombing raids were carried out by B-25s and B-24s of the USAAF to destroy the bridge over the Myitnge River carrying the main railway line from Mandalay to Rangoon. They returned the following December to bomb the bridge and the rail yards at nearby Paleik. Two years later it was the turn of the RAF Thunderbolts to attack the bridge. Myitnge River is today spanned by a new bridge, 700 feet long and 27 feet wide for motor traffic flanked on each side by a footpath 6 feet wide, and was opened in 1999.

== Dams ==
A 790 megawatt hydroelectric power plant called Yeywa Dam Project, with assistance from China, is under way on the Myitnge River 50 km (31 mi) southeast of Mandalay.
