= Tasang Dam =

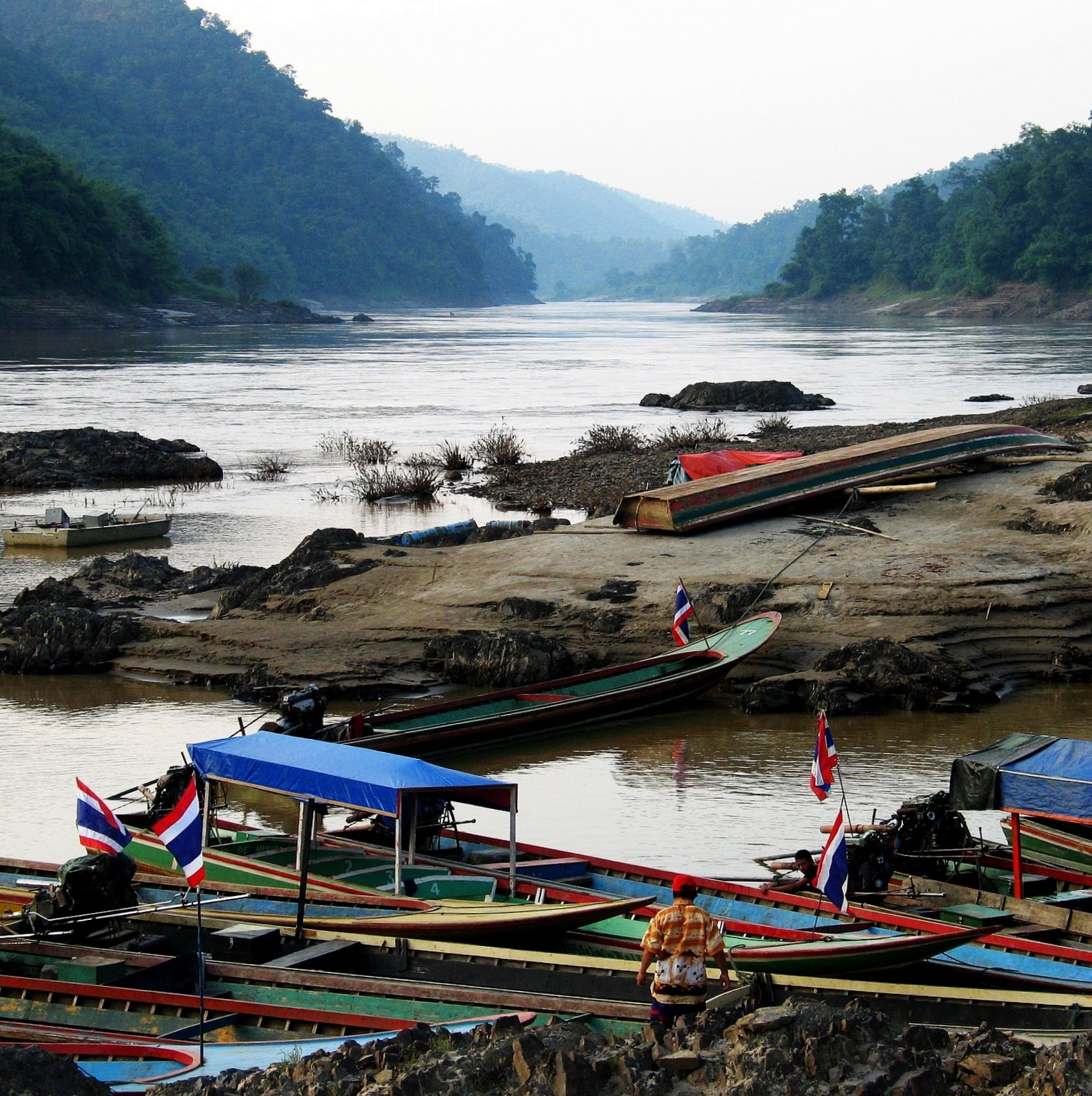
- Salween River downstream of Tasang Dam site

- Location within Myanmar
- Location: Shan State, Myanmar
- Coordinates: 20°27′23″N 98°39′0″E
- Opening date: unknown
- Construction cost: 6^{+} billion USD
- Operator: Myanmar Electric Power Enterprise

Dam and spillways
- Impounds: Salween River
- Height: 228 metres (748 ft)

Reservoir
- Surface area: 870 km^{2} (340 sq mi)

Power Station
- Installed capacity: 7110 MW
- Annual generation: 35,446 GWh per year

The Tasang Dam (Burmese: တာဆန်းဆည်), also known as the Mong Ton Dam, is a planned multi-purpose dam on the Salween River in the Shan State, Myanmar. The Tasang dam's location will be 480 km (300 mi) northeast of Rangoon and 52.8 km (32.8 mi) west of Mongtong. If completed, Tasang Dam would be the first dam on the Salween River, the largest hydroelectric dam in Myanmar and the tallest dam in Southeast Asia. The Tasang will cost more than US$6 billion and is planned for completion in 2022. During 2007, the project began.

Substantial domestic and international controversy surrounds the Tasang Dam project. The Tasang dam is one of five dams the Myanmar Government plans to build on the Salween River.

== Background ==
Since the late 1990s, the Burmese Government proposed to build the Tasang dam but was unable to implement the construction plan until this decade because of civil unrest. Nippon Koei, a Japanese company conducted studies for the dam in 1981 and subsequent studies were done in 2002. Thailand's MDX Group agreed in 2002 to develop the project. Thailand is the main investor in the dam project and the trade of the TaSang's electricity is expected to help relations between Thailand and Burma. 85% of the hydro-electricity produced is expected to be transmitted to Thailand.

== Design ==
The Tasang concrete-faced rockfill dam is designed to be 228 metres (748 ft) tall and house a hydro-power station with a 7,110 MW capacity to produce 35,446 GWh annually. Tasang's 870 km^{2} (340 sq mi) reservoir will bisect a large portion of Shan State, preluding serious social and environmental problems.

== Construction ==
Construction on the dam is being led by the Thai MDX Group along with the China Gezhouba Group Co., Sinohydro Corporation, China Southern Power Grid Company, China Three Gorges Project Corporation and the British Malcolm Dunstan & Associates. During 2007, the project began.

== Social Impact ==
Since 1996, as many as 300,000 villagers, mostly Shan people have been displaced to make room for the Tasang Dam's reservoir. Thousands more relocations are expected as construction progresses. The dam's reservoir will dissect Shan State in half –almost to the Chinese border – and will negatively impact the local communities and ecosystems. Myanmar's Junta is responsible for the relocations and there have reports of serious human rights violations including executions.
