= Bago Region Government =

- ပဲခူးတိုင်းဒေသကြီးအစိုးရအဖွဲ့
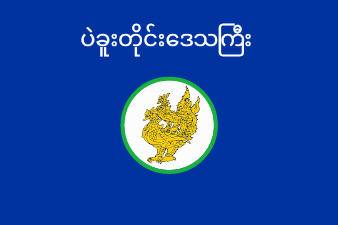
- Flag of Bago Region

Government overview
- Formed: 30 March 2010
- Jurisdiction: Bago Region Hluttaw
- Headquarters: Bago, Bago Region
- Government executive: Win Thein, Chief Minister
- Parent department: Government of Myanmar
- Website: www.bagoregion.gov.mm

Bago Region Government is the cabinet of Bago Region, Myanmar. The cabinet is led by chief minister, Myo Swe Win.

== Cabinet (February 2021–present) ==
No.	Name	Portfolio
(1)	U Myo Swe Win	Chief Minister
(2)	Hla Myo Shwe, Col.	Minister of Security and Border Affairs
(3)	U Tin Oo	Minister of Economy
(4)	U Tin Thein	Minister of Natural Resources
(5)	U Aung Min	Minister of Social Affairs
(6)	U Kyaw Htut, Police Chief Colonel	Minister of Road Transportation
(7)	U Saw Linn Aung	Minister of Ethnic Affairs
(8)	U Khin Maung Tint	Region Attorney General
(9)	U Aye Maung Kyi, Secretary	Bago Region Government
