= Flag of Mon State =

Flag of state of Myanmar

Mon State
- Proportion: 2:3
- Adopted: 8 June 2018
- Design: A red flag with a yellow hamsa in the centre
- Use: Former flag
- Proportion: 2:3
- Relinquished: 8 June 2018
- Design: A blue flag with a yellow hamsa in the centre and "Mon State" written in Burmese underneath it

The flag of Mon State depicts a hamsa in the centre of a red background. The current flag was approved by the Mon State Hluttaw and officially adopted on 8 June 2018.

In local legend, the city of Bago, which was founded by the Mon people, was established on the location where a hamsa sought refuge during a massive flood, hence the adoption of the bird on the flag.

== Former flag ==
The former flag of Mon State, used until the adoption of the current flag on 8 June 2018, depicted a hamsa on a dark blue background and had "Mon State" (မွန်ပြည်နယ်) written underneath it. The flag of Bago Region is very similar to the former flag of Mon State, but its hamsa and text have different proportions and designs.
