= Basic Education High School No. 3 Bago =

School in Bago, Myanmar

Coordinates: 17°20′03″N 96°28′58″E

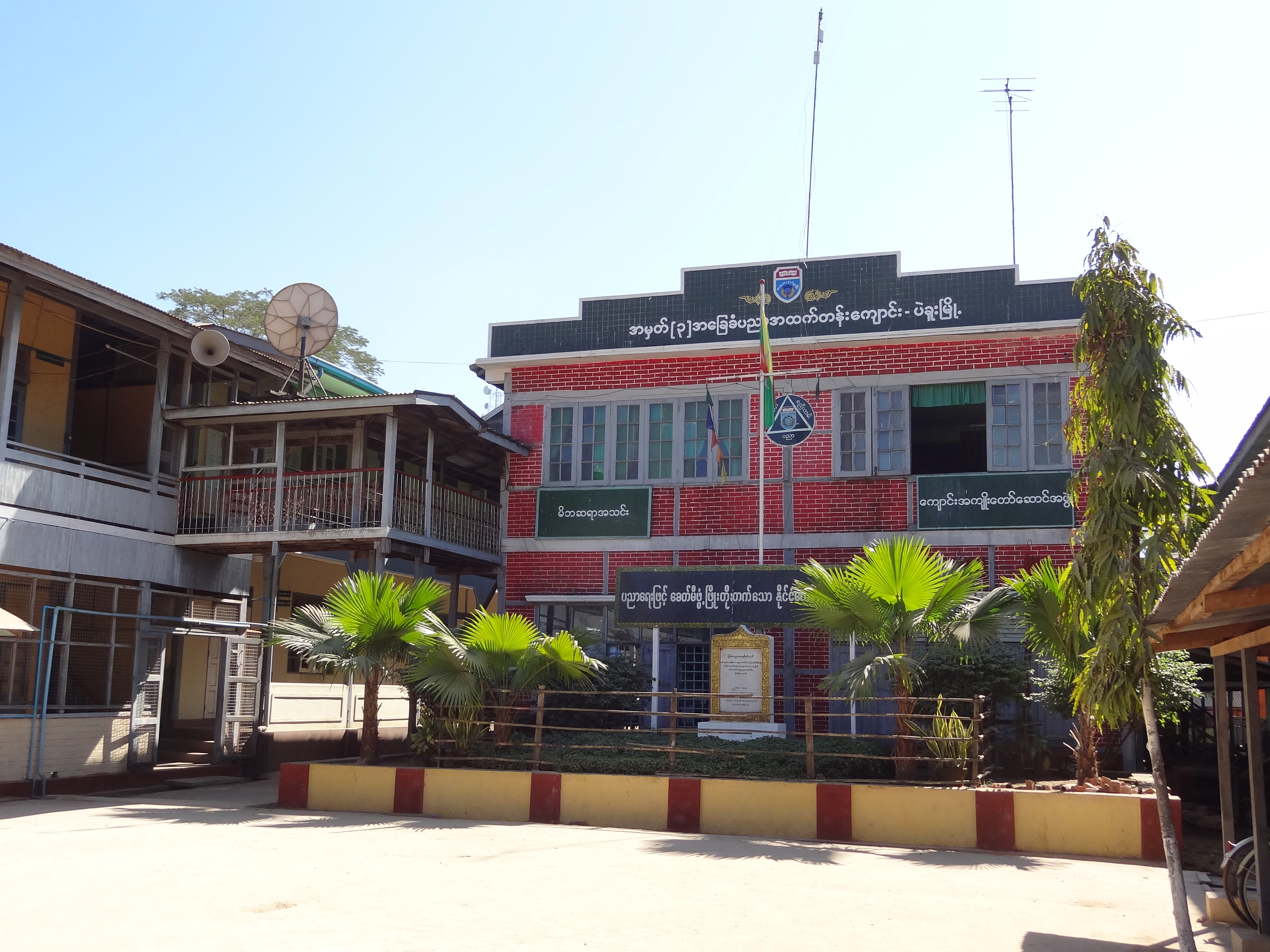
Office Building of BEHS No 3, Bago

Basic Education High School No. 3, Bago is a government high school in Bago under the Department of Basic Education, Ministry of Education, Myanmar.

It was formerly known as

1. State High School No. 3, Pegu [S.H.S (3) Pegu] (1965–1983)
2. National High School, Pegu (1921–1965)
3. Y.M.B.A Middle School (1912–1921)

== Location ==
It is in Bago, regional capital of Bago Region, Myanmar. Its GPS coordinate is N 17.334087, E 96.482849.

== History ==
It was established as Young Men's Buddhist Association (YMBA) Middle school at the same place and in the same edifice in 1912 and financed by townspeople of Bago (known as Pegu previously). When national education system was started by nationalist volunteer teachers to go against British's colonial education system, townspeople of Bago held mass meeting at Shwemawdaw Pagoda and decided to upgrade YMBA middle school of Bago to National High School on 27 December 1920. YMBA school building is well maintained as national heritage, which is called YMBA building till now. It was closed and badly damaged during World War II. Badly damaged school was rebuilt and reopened on 2 June 1947 with the effort of former headmaster Sayargyi U Than and townspeople. It was managed by school committee as non-governmental organization (NGO).

It became State High School No. 3, Pegu (S.H.S 3, Pegu) on 1 April 1965 when all the scha well known Government High Schools in Myanmar (Bruma) were nationalized by Union Revolutionary Council, led by General Ne Win. The name was changed to Basic Education High School No. 3, Bago when basic education system was restructured.

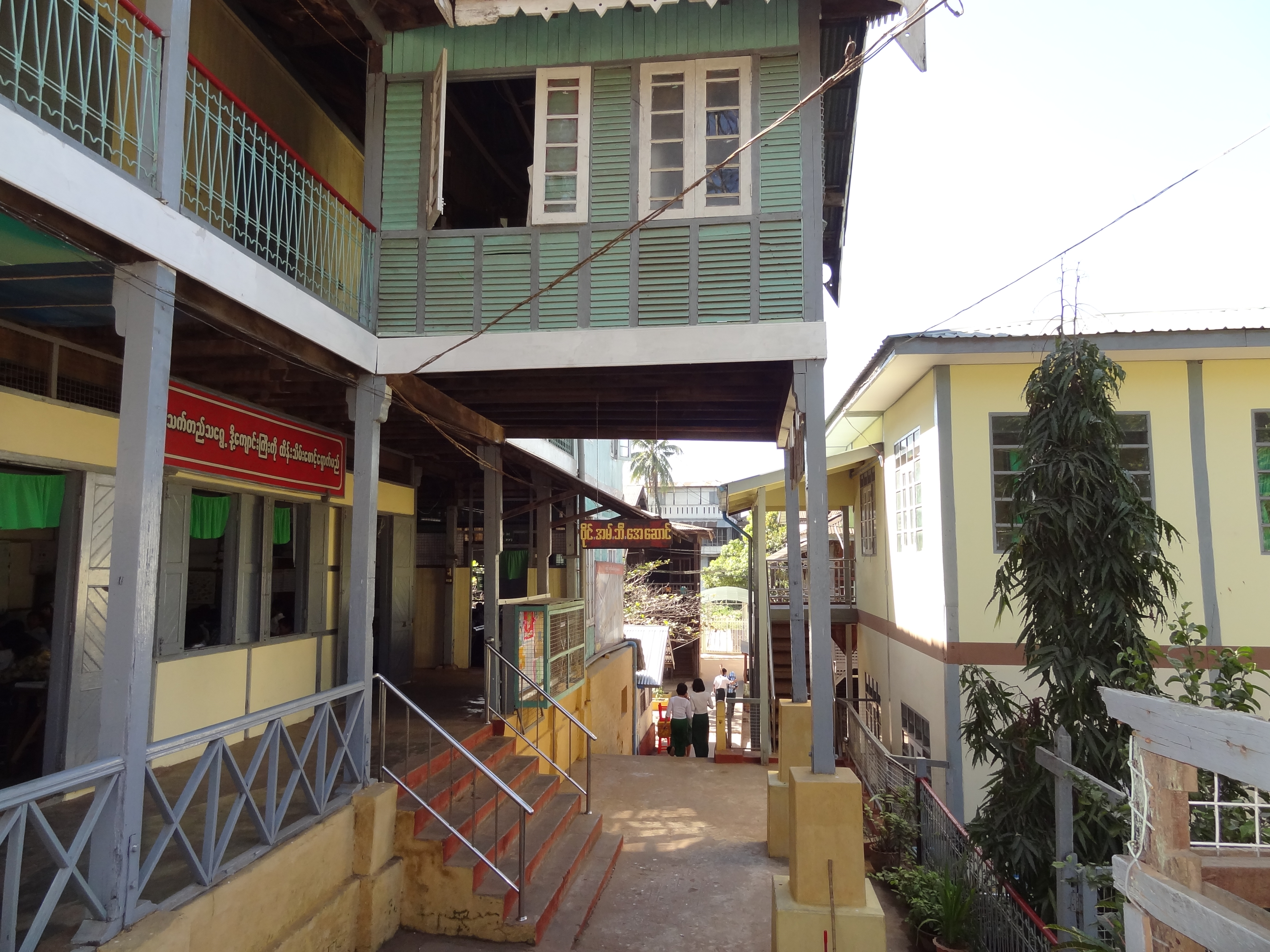
Part of YMBA building seen in 2012

== Teachers who founded the school ==
1. U Thet Tin
2. U Thar Din
3. U Than
4. U Ba Kyi

== Headmasters or headmistress since 1923 ==
1. U Thar Din
2. U Than
3. U Ba Kyi
4. U Myint oo
5. U Win Maung
6. U Kyin Thein
7. Daw Tin New Oo
8. Dr Zin The Oo

The centenary of the school was celebrated on 8 December 2012, in conjunction with 92nd National day of Myanmar.
