= Mahazedi Pagoda =

Buddhist pagoda in Bago, Myanmar

- မဟာစေတီ
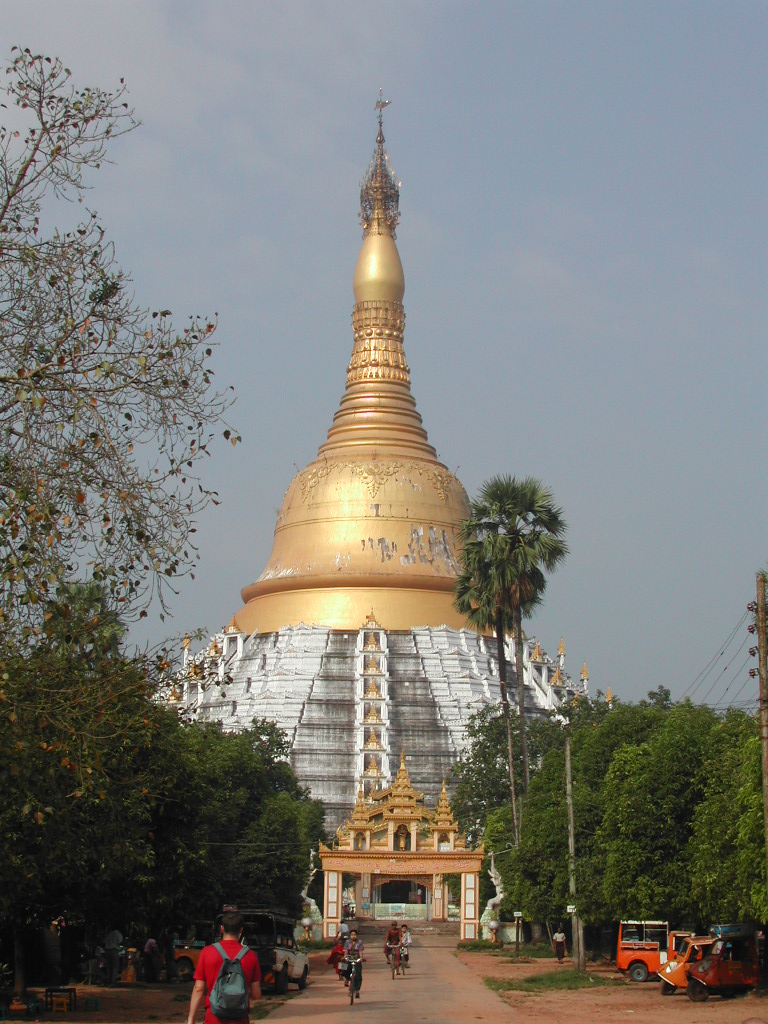

- Location within Myanmar

Religion
- Affiliation: Buddhism
- Sect: Theravada Buddhism
- Region: Bago Region

Location
- Municipality: Bago
- Country: Myanmar
- Coordinates: 17.339151°N 96.454237°E

Architecture
- Founder: Bayinnaung
- Groundbreaking: 15 November 1559 (original structure); Wednesday, 2nd waning of Nadaw 921 ME (Note: The relic chamber was dedicated on Wednesday, 2nd waning of Nadaw 921 ME (Wednesday, 15 November 1599).)
- Completed: 2 January 1561 (original); Thursday, 2nd waning of Pyatho, 922 ME (Note: The construction of the pagoda was completed in May 1560 (six months after the relic chamber dedication ceremony). The hti umbrella raising ceremony was held on 2nd waning of Pyatho 922 ME (Thursday, 2 January 1561).)

Mahazedi Pagoda (Burmese: မဟာစေတီ) is a prominent Buddhist pagoda in Bago, Myanmar.

== History ==
The pagoda was built by King Bayinnaung to house a gold and jewel-encrusted tooth relic of the Buddha. The tooth relic was a replica from Dharmapala of Kotte, the king of the Kingdom of Kotte, who gifted his daughter, along with the tooth relic and an alms bowl. The construction of the pagoda began in November 1559, and was completed six months later in May 1560. The footprint of the pagoda was 100 taung (45.72 m (150 ft)) in diameter, and the height was 150 taung (68.58 m (225 ft)), without the hti ("umbrella spire"). The hti spire was raised atop the pagoda for the first time on 2 January 1561.

The relics arrived in 1576. In 1599, King Anaukpetlun conquered Bago and removed the relics to Taungoo. In 1636, King Thalun moved the relics to Inwa, enshrining them at the Kaunghmudaw Pagoda in Sagaing. Located along the Sagaing Fault, the pagoda has been destroyed by several earthquakes throughout its history, including on 13 September 1564, 1583, and 8 October 1888, and was completely leveled in 1930. Mahazedi Pagoda was rebuilt in the 1950s.

== Bibliography ==
- Kala, U (2006) [1724]. Maha Yazawin (in Burmese). Vol. 1–3 (4th printing ed.). Yangon: Ya-Pyei Publishing.
- Maha Sithu (2012) [1798]. Kyaw Win; Thein Hlaing (eds.). Yazawin Thit (in Burmese). Vol. 1–3 (2nd ed.). Yangon: Ya-Pyei Publishing.
- Royal Historical Commission of Burma (2003) [1832]. Hmannan Yazawin (in Burmese). Vol. 1–3. Yangon: Ministry of Information, Myanmar.
