= Win Thein =

Burmese chief minister

- ဝင်းသိန်း

2nd Chief Minister of Bago Region
- In office March 30, 2016 – 1 February 2021
- Appointed by: President of Myanmar
- President: Htin Kyaw
- Preceded by: Nyan Win
- Succeeded by: Myo Swe Win

Personal details
- Children: One son
- Cabinet: Bago Region Government

Win Thein (ဝင်းသိန်း; b. c. 1964) is an engineer and a former chief minister of Bago Region, appointed by president Htin Kyaw in 2016.

== Early life and education ==
Win Thein graduated with a bachelor's in mechanical engineering and an AGTI diploma. Before becoming a politician for Yedashe Township, he worked as a farmer.

== Career ==
Win Thein was appointed as Chief Minister of Bago Region on 30 March 2016 by President Htin Kyaw. In October 2019, he apologized for controversial remarks encouraging villagers to marry schoolteachers to retain them in the countryside. In the wake of the 2021 Myanmar coup d'état on 1 February, he was detained by the Myanmar Armed Forces.
