= Flag of Bago Region =

Flag of region of Myanmar

Bago Region
- Proportion: 2:3
- Adopted: c. 2018
- Design: A blue flag with two yellow hamsas (one sitting on the other's back) on a white circle with green border charged in the centre and the white text "Bago Region" written in Burmese above it
- Use: Former flag
- Proportion: 2:3
- Adopted: 1974
- Relinquished: 2010
- Design: A blue flag with a yellow hamsa in the centre and the yellow text "Bago Division" written in Burmese underneath it
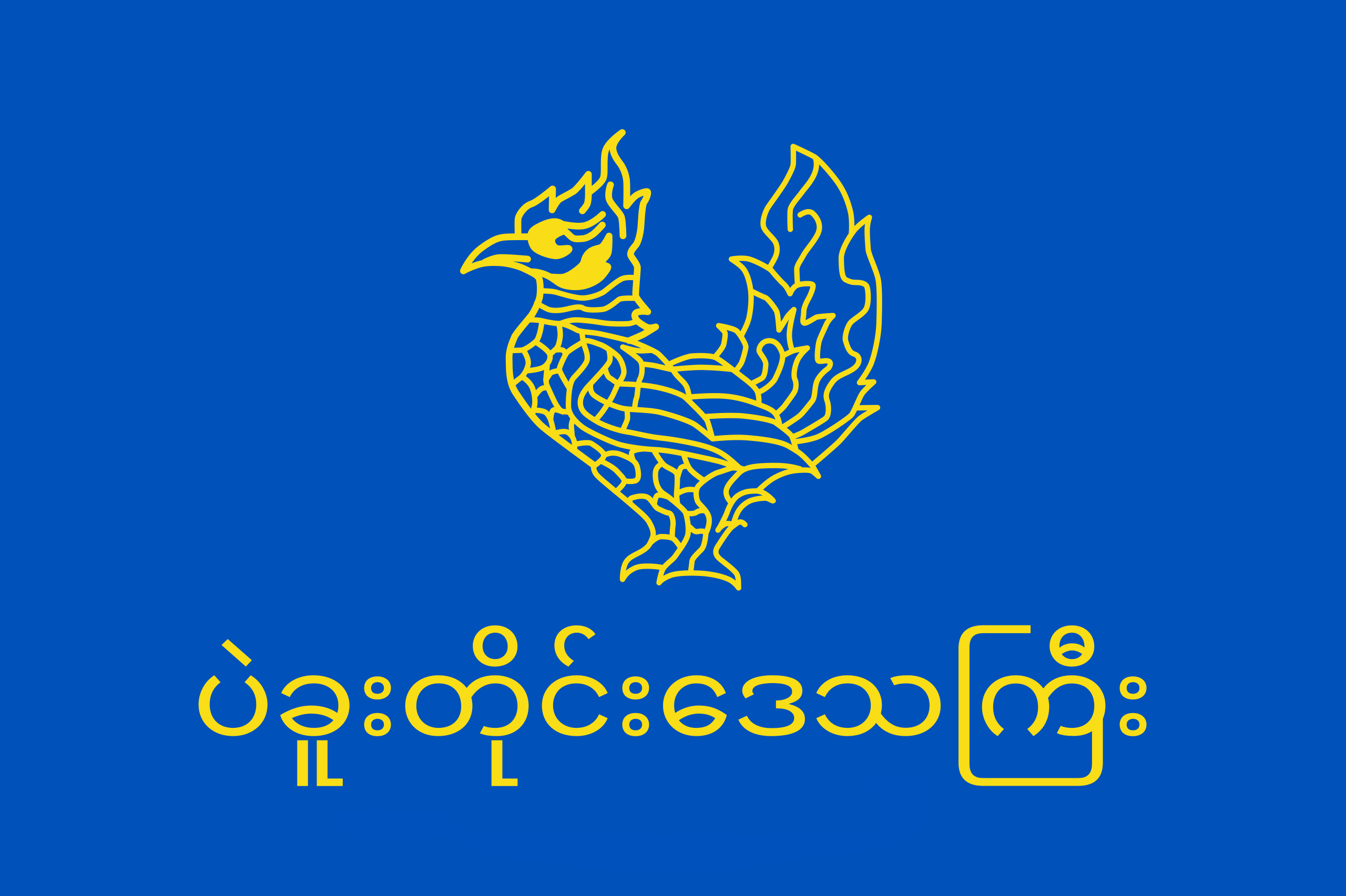
- Use: Former flag
- Proportion: 2:3
- Adopted: 2010
- Relinquished: c. 2019
- Design: A blue flag with a yellow hamsa in the centre and the yellow text "Bago Region" written in Burmese underneath it

The flag of Bago Region depicts two golden hamsas, female one sitting on the male's back, on a white circle bordered by green charged at the centre of blue background. The name "Bago Region" (ပဲခူးတိုင်းဒေသကြီး) is written in Burmese above the birds.

A variant of the flag is presented to winning sports teams representing the region.

== Symbolism ==
According to local legend, the city of Bago was established on the location where a male hamsa landed on a single rock above the floodwaters and let the female stand on his back, during a massive flood, hence the adoption of that couple on the flag and seal of Bago.

== Former flag ==
The former flag of Bago Region, adopted in 1974, depicts a hamsa on a blue background. "Bago Division" (ပဲခူးတိုင်း), the former name of Bago Region, is written in Burmese underneath the bird. After renaming of Myanmar administrative divisions in 2010, the name on the flag also changed accordingly — the word "big region" (ဒေသကြီး) was added to become "Bago Region" (ပဲခူးတိုင်းဒေသကြီး). Around 2018, a new design, which replaces the single golden hamsa with two golden hamsas on a green-bordered white circle, started to appear in sport tournaments.

The former flag of Mon State is similar to the pre-2018 flag of Bago Region, but its hamsa and text have different proportions and designs.
