= List of renamed places in Myanmar =

Many cities and towns in Myanmar were renamed in 1989 by the State Law and Order Restoration Council following a seizure of power by Saw Maung. Some places were renamed to their traditional, pre-colonial names, others were simply a bid to make their spellings better reflect their true Burmese pronunciation.

Old Name	New Name	Notes
Akha	Kaw	
Akyab	Sittwe	
Arakan	Rakhine	
Ava	Inwa	
Bassein	Pathein	
Bre	Kayaw	
Burma	Myanmar	The official adjectival form is Myanma. However, the Burmese language was renamed Myanmar language, while the Burmese (Burman) ethnic group are now Bamar people.
Chin	Zomi	
Chindwin	Chindwinn	
Henzada	Hinthada	
Hmong	Meo	
Irrawaddy	Ayeyarwady	
Karen	Kayin	Both the state and ethnic group
Karenni	Kayah	Both the state and ethnic group
Kemmendine	Kyimyindaing Township	
Magwe	Magway Division	
Maymyo	Pyin U Lwin/Pyin Oo Lwin	
Mergui	Myeik District	
Moulmein	Mawlamyine	
Pagan/Pagahn Mew	Bagan	
Pa-O	Taungthu	
Pegu	Bago	
Prome	Pyay	
Rangoon	Yangon	
Salween	Thanlwin	
Sandoway	Thandwe	
Shan	Tai	
Ta-ang	Palaung	
Tavoy	Dawei	
Tenasserim	Tanintharyi	
Tonghoo	Taungoo	
Syriam	Thanlyin	
Victoria Point	Kawthaung	

Thibaw
