= Bago Region =

Region of Myanmar

Bago Region ပဲခူးတိုင်းဒေသကြီး
- Division

Myanma transcription(s)
  - Burmese: pai: hku: tuing: desa. kri:
- Flag

- Location of Bago Region in Myanmar
- Coordinates: 18°15′N 96°0′E
- Country: Myanmar
- Region: Lower
- Capital: Bago

Government
  - Chief Minister: Myo Swe Win
  - Cabinet: Bago Region Government
  - Legislature: Bago Region Hluttaw
  - Judiciary: Bago Region High Court

Area
  - Total: 39,402.3 km^{2} (15,213.3 sq mi)
  - Rank: 6th
- Highest elevation (Yomakyo): 1,889 m (6,198 ft)

Population (2014)
  - Total: 4,867,373
  - Rank: 6th
  - Density: 123.530/km^{2} (319.942/sq mi)
- Demonym: Bagoan

Demographics
  - Ethnicities: Bamar, Kayin, Mon, Shan, Indians, Chinese, Pa'O
  - Religions: Buddhism 93.5% Christianity 2.9% Hinduism 2.0% Islam 1.3% Others 0.3%
- Time zone: UTC+06:30 (MST)
- HDI (2017): 0.547 low · 9th
- Website: bagoregion.gov.mm

Bago Region (Burmese: ပဲခူးတိုင်းဒေသကြီး, pronounced [bəɡó táɪɰ̃ dèθa̰ dʑí]; formerly Pegu Division and Bago Division) is a first-level administrative division of Myanmar, located in the southern central part of the country. It is bordered by Magway Region and Mandalay Region to the north; Kayin State, Mon State and the Gulf of Martaban to the east; Yangon Region to the south and Ayeyarwady Region and Rakhine State to the west. It is located between 46°45' N and 19°20' N and 94°35' E and 97°10' E. It has a population of 4,867,373 (2014). The capital city of the region is Bago.

== History ==
According to legend, two Mon princes from Thaton founded the city of Bago in 573 AD. They saw a female Hamsa standing on the back of a male Hamsa on an island in a huge lake. Believing this was an auspicious omen, the princes built a city called Hanthawady (Pali: Haṃsāvatī) on the edge of the lake.

The Persian geographer Ibn Khordadbeh mentions the city around 850 AD. The Mon capital was still in Thaton at that time. The Thiruvalangadu plate describes Rajendra Chola I, the Chola Emperor from South India, as having conquered "Kadaram" in the fourteenth year of his reign- 1028 CE. According to one interpretation, Kadaram refers to Bago. More modern interpretations understand Kadaram to be Kedah in modern-day Malaysia, instead of Bago. The earliest reliable external record of Bago comes from Chinese sources that mention Jayavarman VII adding Pegu to the territory of the Khmer Empire in 1195. The Bamar from Bagan ruled the area in 1056. After the collapse of Bagan to the Mongols in 1287, the Mon regained their independence.

From 1369 to 1539, Hanthawady was the capital of the Hanthawaddy kingdom, which covered all of what is now lower Burma. The area came under Burman control again in 1539, when it was annexed by King Tabinshwehti of Kingdom of Taungoo. The kings of Taungoo made Bago their royal capital from 1539 to 1599, and used it as a base for their repeated invasions of Siam. As a major seaport, the city was frequently visited by Europeans, who commented on its magnificence. The Burmese capital was relocated to Ava in 1634. In 1740, the Mon revolted and briefly regained their independence, but the Burmese King Alaungpaya sacked and destroyed the city (along with Mon independence) in 1757.

Burmese King Bodawpaya (1782–1819) rebuilt Bago, but by then the river had shifted course, cutting the city off from the sea. It never regained its previous importance. After the Second Anglo-Burmese War, the British annexed Bago in 1852. In 1862, with the formation of the province of British Burma, the capital was moved to Yangon.

== Administrative divisions ==
6 districts of Bago Region Bago District Pyay District Tharrawaddy District Taungoo District Nyaunglebin District Nattalin District

Bago Region occupies an area of 39,400 square kilometres (15,214 sq mi) divided into the six districts of Bago, Pyay, Tharrawaddy, Taungoo, Nyaunglebin and Nattalin. Bago, the divisional capital, is the fourth largest town of Burma. Other major cities include Taungoo and Pyay.

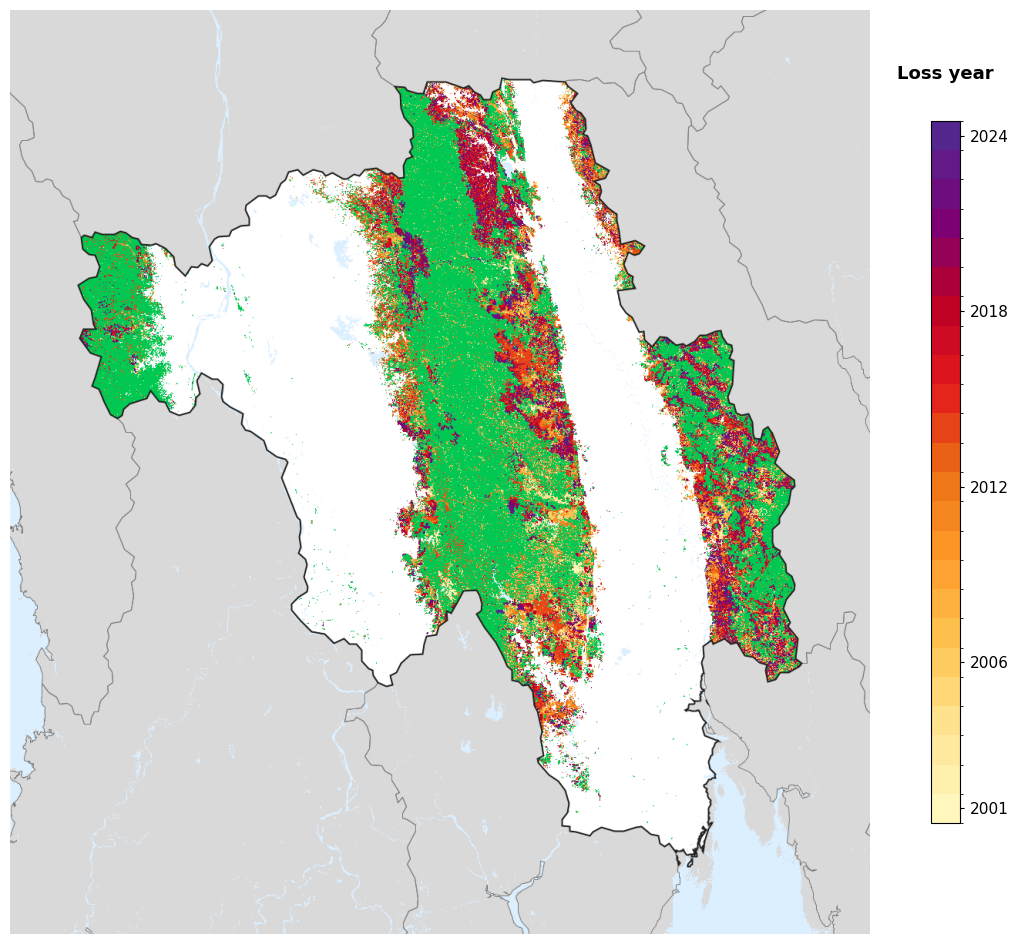
Tree-cover loss year in Bago Region, 2001-2024, from the Global Forest Change dataset.

Bago Region's seal are two sibling hintha (hamsa), due to historic Mon influences in the area.

== Government ==
=== Executive ===
The Bago Region Government is the government of Bago Region, responsible for the region's governance. It is led by the Chief Minister of Bago Region. Before 2026, the region was administered by the SAC (State Administration Council), following the 2021 Myanmar coup.

=== Legislature ===
The Bago Region Hluttaw is the legislature of Bago Region, responsible for local governance, passing regional laws, approving localized budgets, and overseeing the region cabinet. The Hluttaw has 76 seats and is unicameral. The latest election for the Bago Region Hluttaw concluded in 2026.

=== Judiciary ===
Bago Region High Court is the region's highest-level court.

== Transport ==
Bago Region is served by Pyay Airport.

== Demographics ==
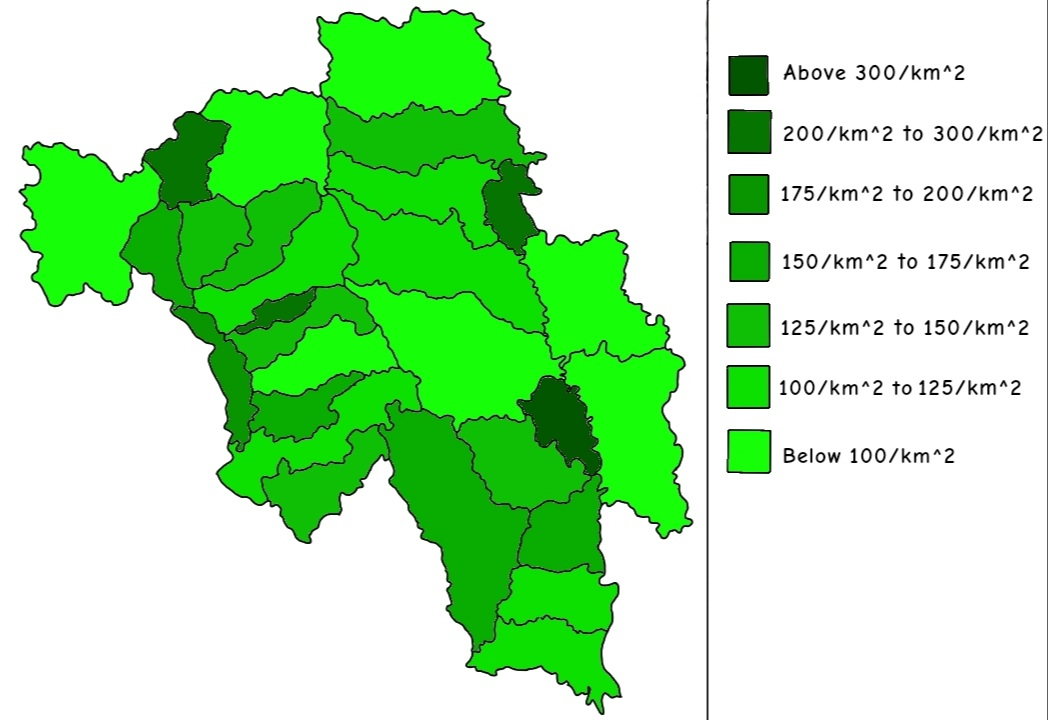
Population density of Bago Region as of 2024

Historical population
Year	Pop.	±%
1973	3,179,604	—
1983	3,799,791	+19.5%
2014	4,867,373	+28.1%
Source: 2014 Myanmar Census

The total population of Bago Region is 4,863,455 according to 2014 Burma Census. The Burmese language is the lingua franca.

=== Ethnic makeup ===
Ethnic composition of Bago Region
Ethnic group	Percentage
Bamar	89.9%
Karen	4.6%
Other	4.6%
Shan	0.9%
Source: 2019 GAD township reports

The Bamar make up the majority of the region's population. The Karen are the region's largest minority. Other represented ethnic groups include the Mon, Chin, Rakhine, Shan, South Asians, Chinese, and Pa-O.

After the 2014 Census in Myanmar, the Burmese government indefinitely withheld release of detailed ethnicity data, citing concerns around political and social concerns surrounding the issue of ethnicity in Myanmar. In 2022, researchers published an analysis of the General Administration Department's nationwide 2018-2019 township reports to tabulate the ethnic makeup of the region.

=== Religion ===
Religion in Bago Region (2014)
1. Buddhism (93.5%)
2. Christianity (2.90%)
3. Hinduism (2.00%)
4. Islam (1.20%)
5. Other religion (0.30%)
6. Tribal religion (0.10%)

According to the 2014 Myanmar Census, Buddhists make up 93.5% of Bago Region's population, forming the largest religious community there. Minority religious communities include Christians (2.9%), Muslims (1.2%), Hindus (2.1%), and animists (0.1%) who collectively comprise the remainder of Bago Region's population. 0.3% of the population listed no religion, other religions, or were otherwise not enumerated.

According to the State Sangha Maha Nayaka Committee's 2016 statistics, 50,198 Buddhist monks were registered in Bago Region, comprising 9.4% of Myanmar's total Sangha membership, which includes both novice samanera and fully-ordained bhikkhu. The majority of monks belong to the Thudhamma Nikaya (77.3%), followed by Shwegyin Nikaya (16.7%), with the remainder of monks belonging to other small monastic orders. 5,100 thilashin were registered in Bago Region, comprising 8.4% of Myanmar's total thilashin community.

== Economy ==
The division's economy is strongly dependent on the timber trade. Taungoo, in the northern end of the Bago Region, is bordered by mountain ranges, home to teak and other hardwoods. Another natural resource is petroleum. The major crop is rice, occupying over two-thirds of the available agricultural land. Other major crops include betel nut, sugarcane, maize, groundnut, sesamum, sunflower, beans and pulses, cotton, jute, rubber, tobacco, tapioca, banana, Nipa palm and toddy. Industry includes fisheries, salt, ceramics, sugar, paper, plywood, distilleries, and monosodium glutamate.

The division has a small livestock breeding and fisheries sector, and a small industrial sector. In 2005, it had over 4 million farm animals; nearly 1,200 hectares (3,000 acres) of fish and prawn farms; and about 3000 private factories and about 100 state owned factories.

The major tourist sites of the Bago Region can be reached as a day trip from Yangon.

=== Hydropower plant ===
The Shwegyin Dam is in the eastern part of Bago Region. It is a 478 metres (1,568 ft) long, 41 metres (135 ft) wide and 0.8 metres (2.5 ft) thick zone-type dam with a water storage capacity of 2,078,417 megalitres . The three concrete conduit pipes are 538 metres (1,765 ft) in length, 5 metres (16 ft) in width and 6 metres (20 ft) in height each. The intake infrastructure is 37 metres (121 ft) long, 39 metres (127 ft) wide and 42 metres (137 ft) high. The spillway is 775 metres (2,542 ft) long, 41 metres (135 ft) wide and 18 metres (58 ft) high. Two compressed steel pipe lines at the dam are 8 metres (25 ft) in diameter and 335 metres (1,100 ft) in length each. The power plant is 90 metres (295 ft) long, 29 metres (94 ft) wide and 21 metres (70 ft) high. It is equipped with four 18.75-MW Francis vertical shaft turbines. It can generate 262 million KW hours per year.

The construction of the dam was launched in 2003. The first power station was opened on 29 December 2009, the second on 25 March 2011, the third on 2 June 2011 and the fourth on 21 July 2011. It was inaugurated on 22 October 2011.

== Education ==
- Bago University, Bago
- Computer University, Pyay
- Computer University, Taungoo
- Pyay Education College
- Pyay Technological University
- Pyay University
- Taungoo Educational College
- Taungoo University
- Technological University, Taungoo
- Paku Divinity School

Educational opportunities in Myanmar are extremely limited outside the main cities of Yangon and Mandalay. In 2005, Bago Region had 578 post-primary schools, 119 middle schools and 132 high schools. The following is a summary of the division public school system for the academic year of 2002–2003.

AY 2002–2003	Primary	Middle	High
Schools	3972	227	95
Teachers	17,400	6600	2000
Students	544,000	194,000	71,000

The division is home to one national university, Pyay Technological University and two local universities, Pyay University and Taungoo University.

== Health ==
The general state of health care in Myanmar is poor. The military government spends anywhere from 0.5% to 3% of the country's GDP on health care, consistently ranking among the lowest in the world. Although health care is nominally free, in reality, patients have to pay for medicine and treatment, even in public clinics and hospitals. Public hospitals lack many of the basic facilities and equipment. Moreover, the health care infrastructure outside of Yangon and Mandalay is extremely poor. For example, in 2003, Bago Region had less than a quarter of hospital beds than Yangon Region whose population was just slighter greater. More shocking still, in 2005, this division of five million had only 399 doctors in its public hospitals.

2002–2003	# Hospitals	# Beds
Specialist hospitals	0	0
General hospitals with specialist services	2	400
General hospitals	28	958
Health clinics	46	736
Total	76	2094

== Notable sites ==
- Kyaikpun Buddha
- Shwemawdaw Pagoda
- Shwethalyaung Buddha
- Kanbawzathadi Palace
