= Shwethalyaung Temple =

Buddhist temple in Bago, Myanmar

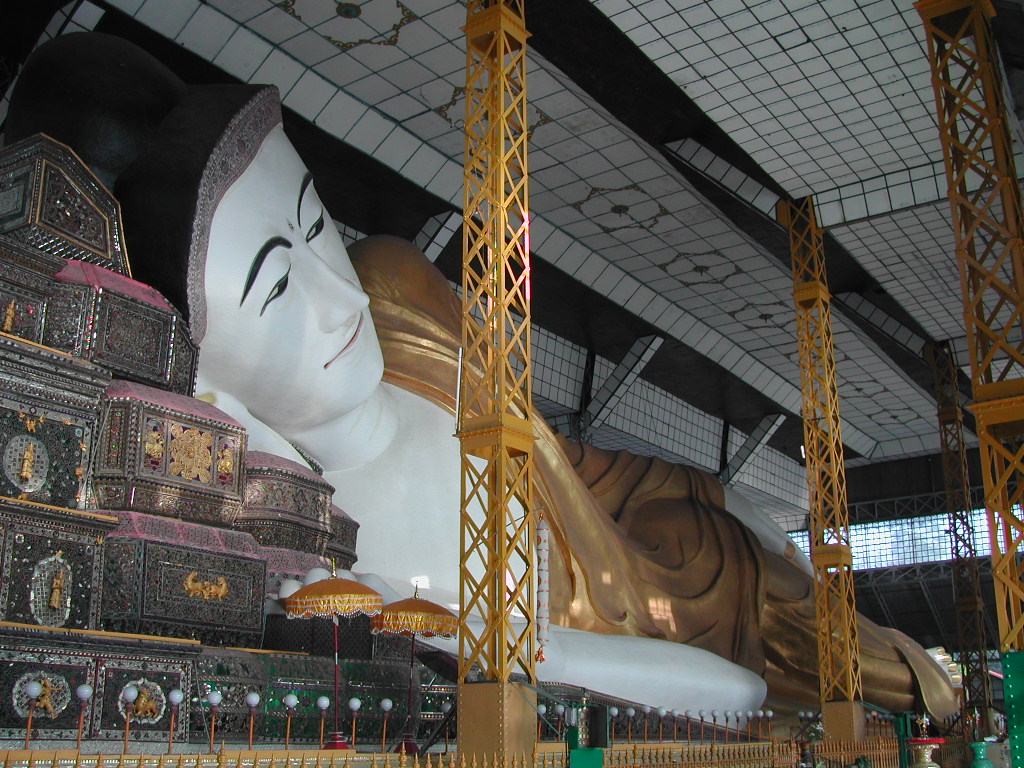

- Location within Myanmar

Religion
- Affiliation: Theravada Buddhism

Location
- Location: Bago
- Country: Myanmar
- Coordinates: 17.337931°N 96.462409°E

Architecture
- Founder: King Migadepa
- Completed: 994; 1032 years ago

The Shwethalyaung Temple (Burmese: ရွှေသာလျှောင်းဘုရား [ʃwèθàljáʊɰ̃ pʰəjá]) is a Buddhist temple on the west side of Bago (Pegu), Myanmar. The name Shwethalyaung means "Golden Image of the Sleeping Buddha". The temple houses a reclining Buddha statue that measures 55 metres (180 ft) in length and 15 metres (49 ft) in height.

According to tradition, the temple was constructed during the reign of King Migadippa in 994. The temple went into disrepair twice before the 15th century and King Alaungpaya ransacked the city in 1757. It was rediscovered in 1881, and renovated.

== Etymology ==
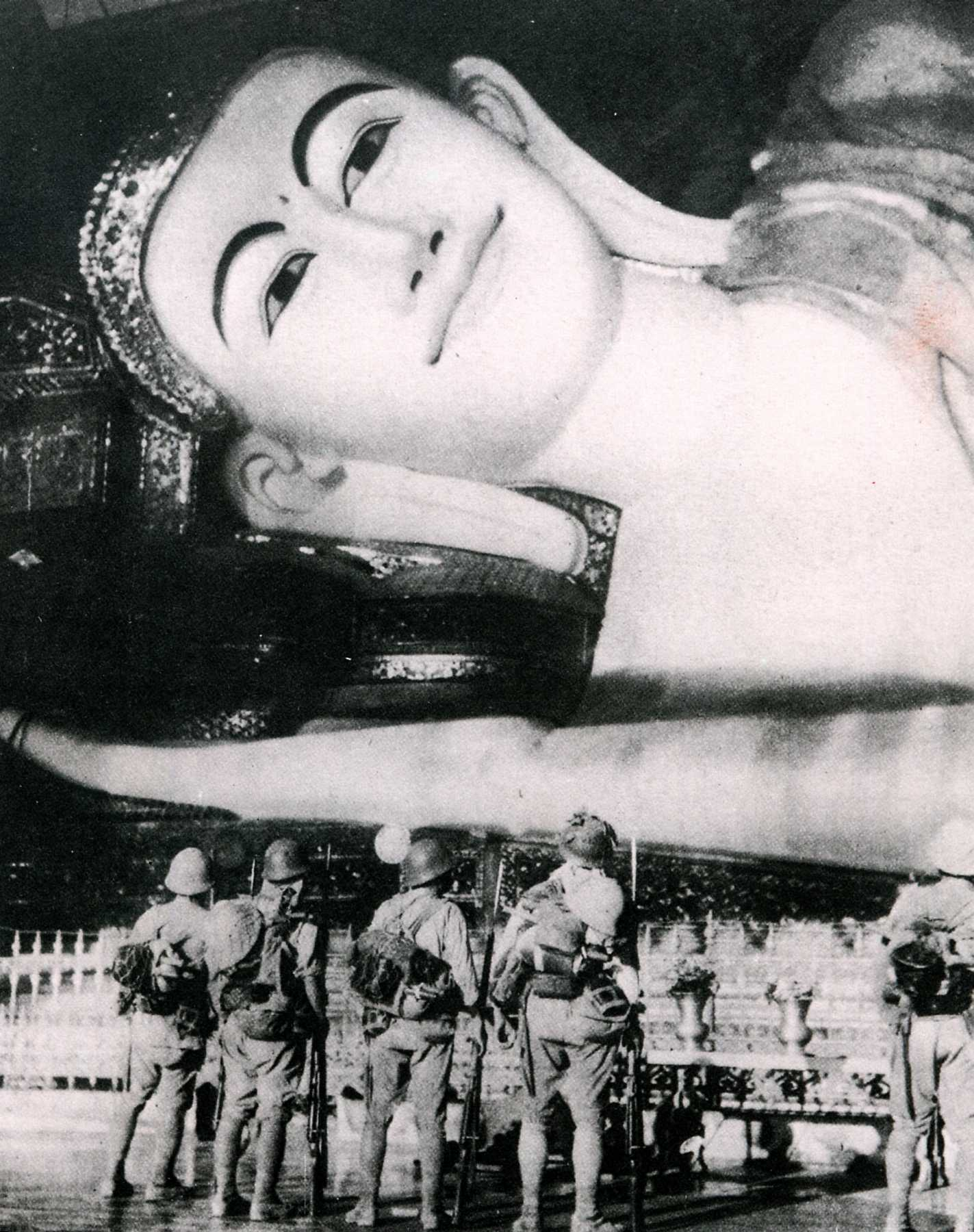
Japanese troops overlooking the Shwethalyaung Buddha

Shwethalyaung means "Golden Image of the Sleeping Buddha".

== History ==
The temple is located 2 kilometres (1.2 mi) to the west of Bago, Myanmar.

The Shwethalyaung Buddha is a reclining Buddha statue that is 180 feet (55 m) long and 50 feet (15 m) in height. It is the largest Buddha statue in pre-colonial southeast Asia. The date of construction for the reclining Buddha is unknown, but is believed to date during the Hanthawaddy kingdom. According to tradition the statue was created by King Migadippa in 994.

The temple fell into disrepair before a renovation in the 15th century. It fell into disrepair again after King Alaungpaya ransacked the area in 1757. British railway workers rediscovered the temple in 1881. In 1906, an iron shelter was constructed around the Buddha statue at the cost of RS 1.5 million.

U.S. Vice President Richard Nixon visited the temple in 1953, and was protested by 80 communists.

== Works cited ==
=== Books ===
- List of Ancient Monuments in Burma. Office of the Superintendent of Burma. 1916.
- Aung-Thwin, Michael (2017). Myanmar in the Fifteenth Century: A Tale of Two Kingdoms. University of Hawaiʻi Press. ISBN 9780824874117.
- Nawrath, Alfred (1956). Eternal India: The Land, the People, the Masterpieces of Architecture and Sculpture of India, Pakistan, Burma and Ceylon. Crown Publishing Group.

=== Journals ===
- Gatellier, Marie (1985). "L'image du Buddha dans la statuaire birmane". Arts Asiatiques. 40. French School of the Far East: 32–40. doi:10.2307/43485386. JSTOR 43485386.
- Harrison, John (2015). "Burma 50 Years On: The RSAA 2014 Tour". Asian Affairs. 46 (2). Routledge: 280–303.
- Hla, U (1978). "Traditional Town Planning in Burma". Journal of the Society of Architectural Historians. 37 (2). University of California Press: 92–104. doi:10.2307/989177. JSTOR 989177.
- Smithies, Marie (1976). "In the Path of the Ancient Mon-Pagan, Pegu and Nakorn Pathom". Journal of the Hong Kong Branch of the Royal Asiatic Society. 16. Royal Asiatic Society Hong Kong Branch: 179–190. doi:10.2307/23886753. JSTOR 23886753.

=== News ===
- "Hand-Shaking Nixon Routs Burma Reds". The Evening Sun. 26 November 1953. p. 3 – via Newspapers.com.
- Feroze, Shahriar (16 November 2015). "Myanmar's mesmerising southeast". The Daily Star. Archived from the original on 12 July 2025.
