= Kyaikpun Buddha =

Buddhist Pagoda in Bago, Myanmar

- ကျာ်ပန်
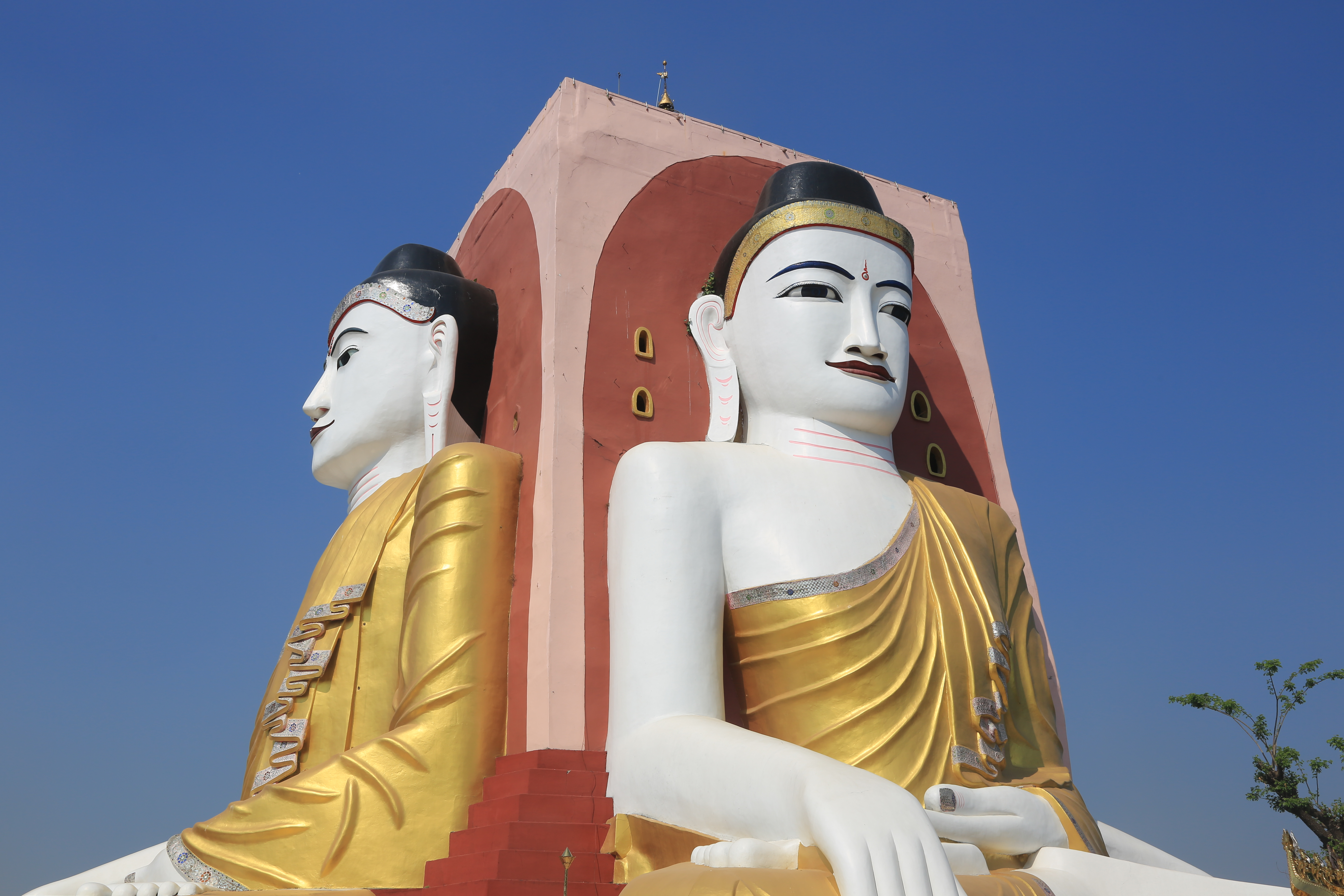

- Location within Myanmar

Religion
- Affiliation: Theravada Buddhism

Location
- Location: Bago
- Country: Myanmar
- Coordinates: 17.304167°N 96.458889°E

Architecture
- Founder: King Dhammazedi
- Completed: 15th century

Kyaikpun Pagoda (ကျာ်ပန်; (Note: Kyaik (Buddha) & Pon (Four)) Burmese: ကျိုက်ပွန်ဘုရား, IPA: [tɕaiʔpʊ̀ɰ̃ pʰəjá]) is a pagoda in Bago, Myanmar. Most notably, Kyaik Pun Pagoda is home to the Four Seated Buddha shrine, a 27 m (89 ft) statue depicting the four Buddhas namely Kakusandha, Konagamana, Kassapa, and Gautama seated in four positions, sitting back to back to four directions. According to tradition, the Four Seated Buddha was built by King Migadippa of Bago the 7th Century AD. It was renovated by King Dhammazedi in the late 15th century.

== Gallery ==
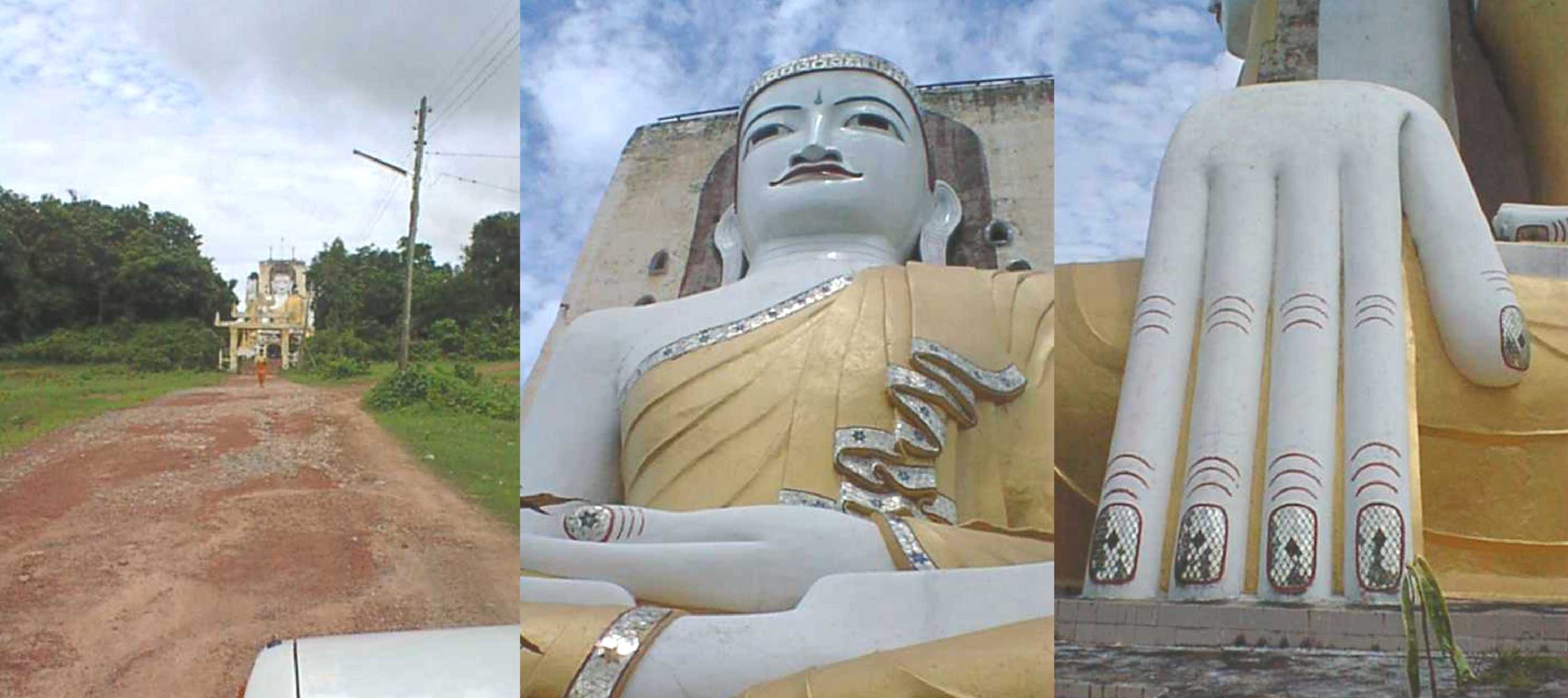
Photographs of Kyaik Pun Paya Buddha
