= Bago, Myanmar =

Bago ပဲခူးမြို့ Pegu
- Capital Town
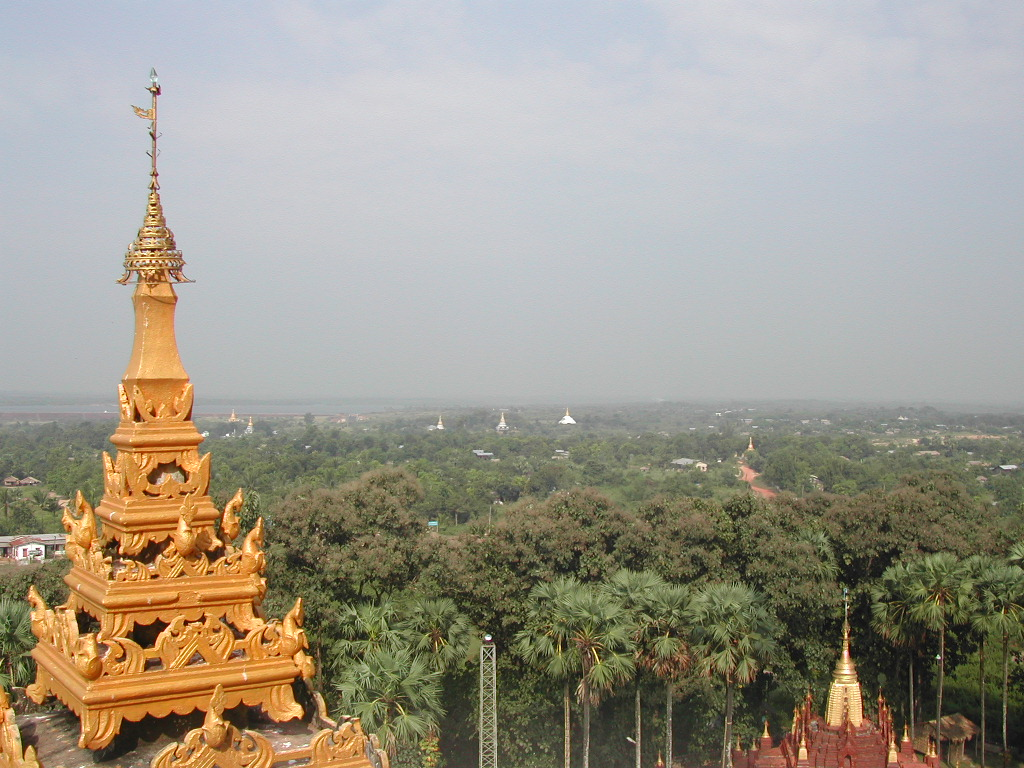
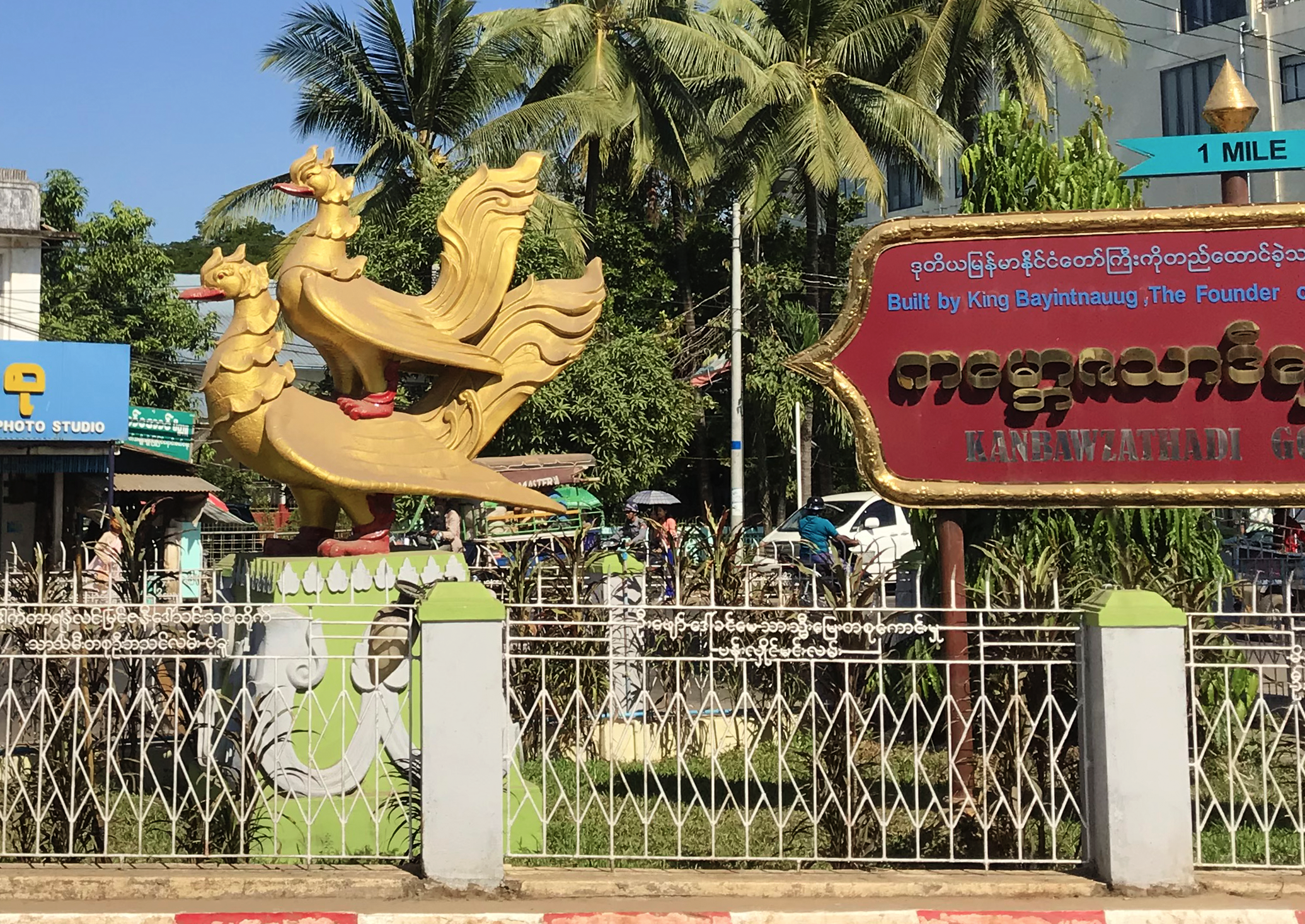

- Location of Bago, Myanmar
- Coordinates: 17°20′12″N 96°28′47″E
- Country: Myanmar
- Region: Bago Region
- District: Bago
- Township: Bago
- Founded: 1152 CE

Area
  - Total: 18.45 sq mi (47.8 km^{2})
- Elevation: 13 ft (4 m)

Population (2019)
  - Total: 179,505
  - Density: 9,729/sq mi (3,756/km^{2})
  - Ethnicities: Bamar; Mon; Shan; Burmese Chinese; Burmese Indians; Kayin
  - Religions: Buddhism; Hinduism; Christianity
- Time zone: UTC+6.30 (MMT)

Bago (formerly spelled Pegu; Burmese: ပဲခူးမြို့, MLCTS: pai: khu: mrui., IPA: [bəɡó mjo̰] , Mon: ဗဂေါ ) formerly known as Hanthawaddy, is the capital of the Bago Region in Myanmar. It is located 91 kilometres (57 mi) north-east of Yangon. The city had a population of 179,505 people in 2019 and was a historical capital of the Taungoo Dynasty and is known for its large pagodas.

== Etymology ==
The Burmese name Bago (ပဲခူး) is likely derived from the Mon language place name Bagaw (Mon: ဗဂေါ, [bəkɜ̀]). Until the Burmese government renamed English place names throughout the country in 1989, Bago was known as Pegu. Bago was formerly known as Hanthawaddy (Burmese: ဟံသာဝတီ; Mon: ဟံသာဝတဳ Hongsawatoi; Pali: Haṃsāvatī; lit. "she who possesses the sheldrake"), the name of a Burmese-Mon kingdom.

An alternative etymology from the 1947 Burmese Encyclopedia derives Bago (ပဲခူး) from Wanpeku (Burmese: ဝမ်းပဲကူး) as a shortening of Where the Hinthawan Ducks Graze (Burmese: ဟင်္သာဝမ်းဘဲများ ကူးသန်းကျက်စားရာ အရပ်). This etymology relies on the non-phonetic Burmese spelling as its main reasoning.

== History ==
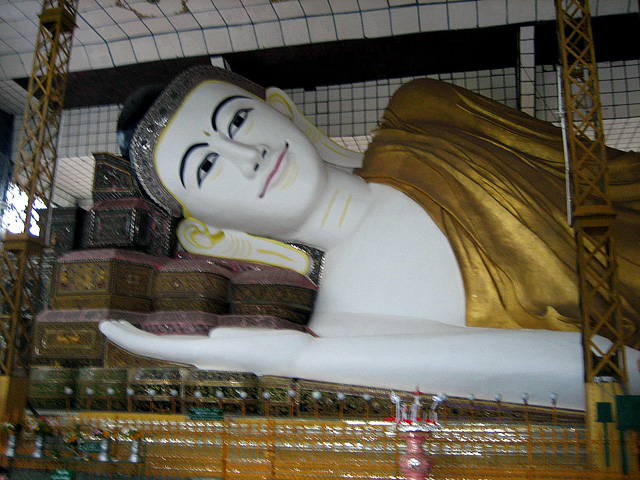
The 177 ft (54 m) Shwethalyaung Buddha, constructed in 994 A.D. by King Migadepa

=== Establishment ===
Various Mon language chronicles report widely divergent foundation dates of Bago, ranging from 573 CE to 1152 CE (Note: A version of the 18th century chronicle Slapat Rajawan as reported by Arthur Phayre (Phayre 1873: 32) states that the settlement was founded in 1116 Buddhist Era (572/573 CE). But another version of the Slapat, used by P.W. Schmidt (Schmidt 1906: 20, 101), states that it was founded on 1st waxing of Mak (Tabodwe) 1116 BE (c. 19 January 573 CE), which it says is equivalent to year 514 of "the third era", without specifying what the era specifically was. However, per (Phayre 1873: 39), one of the "native records" used by Maj. Lloyd says that Pegu was founded in 514 Burmese (Myanmar) Era (1152/1153 CE). If the year 514 is indeed the Burmese Era, then the Slapat's 1st waxing of Tabodwe 514 would be 27 December 1152, equivalent to 1st waxing of Tabodwe 1696 BE (not 1116 BE).) while the Zabu Kuncha, an early 15th century Burmese administrative treatise, states that Pegu was founded in 1276/77 CE.

The earliest extant evidence of Pegu as a place dates only to the late Pagan period (1212 and 1266) (Note: (Aung-Thwin 2005: 59) cites the inscription found at the Min-Nan-Thu village near Bagan, which as shown in (SMK Vol. 3 1983: 28–31) was donated by daughter of Theingathu, dated Thursday, 7th waxing of Nanka (Wagaung) 628 ME (8 July 1266), and lists Pegu as Pe-Ku. (Aung-Thwin 2017: 200, 332) updates by saying that the earliest extant inscriptions that mention Pegu date to 1212 and 1266 but does not provide the source of the 1212 inscription. It must be a recent discovery as none of the inscriptions listed in the Ancient Burmese Stone Inscriptions (SMK Vol. 1 1972: 93–102) for years 573 ME (1211/1212) or 574 ME (1212/1213) shows Pe-Ku or Pegu.) when it was still a small town, not even a provincial capital. After the collapse of the Pagan Empire, Bago became part of the breakaway Kingdom of Martaban by the 1290s.

The earliest possible external record of Bago dates to 1028 CE. The Thiruvalangadu plate describe Rajendra Chola I, the Chola Emperor from South India, as having conquered "Kadaram" in the fourteenth year of his reign – 1028 CE. According to one interpretation, Kadaram refers to Bago. More modern interpretations understand Kadaram to be Kedah in modern day Malaysia, instead of Bago. A Chinese source mentions Jayavarman VII adding Pegu to the territory of the Khmer Empire in 1195.

=== Growth ===
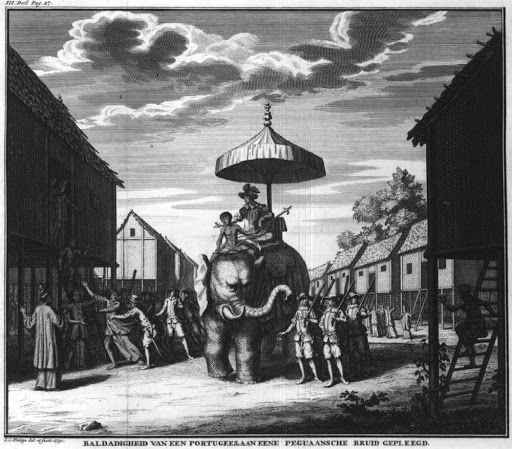
Portuguese Ruler and his Soldiers-Drawing by Philips, Jan Caspar (engraver)

The small settlement grew increasingly important in the 14th century as the region became most populous in the Mon-speaking kingdom. In 1369, King Binnya U made Bago the capital. During the reign of King Razadarit, Bago and the Ava Kingdom were engaged in the Forty Years' War. The peaceful reign of Queen Shin Sawbu came to an end when she chose the Buddhist monk Dhammazedi (1471–1492) to succeed her. Under Dhammazedi, Bago became a centre of commerce and Theravada Buddhism.

In 1519, António Correia, then a merchant from the Portuguese casados settlement at Cochin, landed in Bago (known to the Portuguese as Pegu) looking for new markets for pepper from Cochin. A year later, Portuguese India Governor Diogo Lopes de Sequeira sent an ambassador to Pegu.

=== Toungoo dynastic capital ===
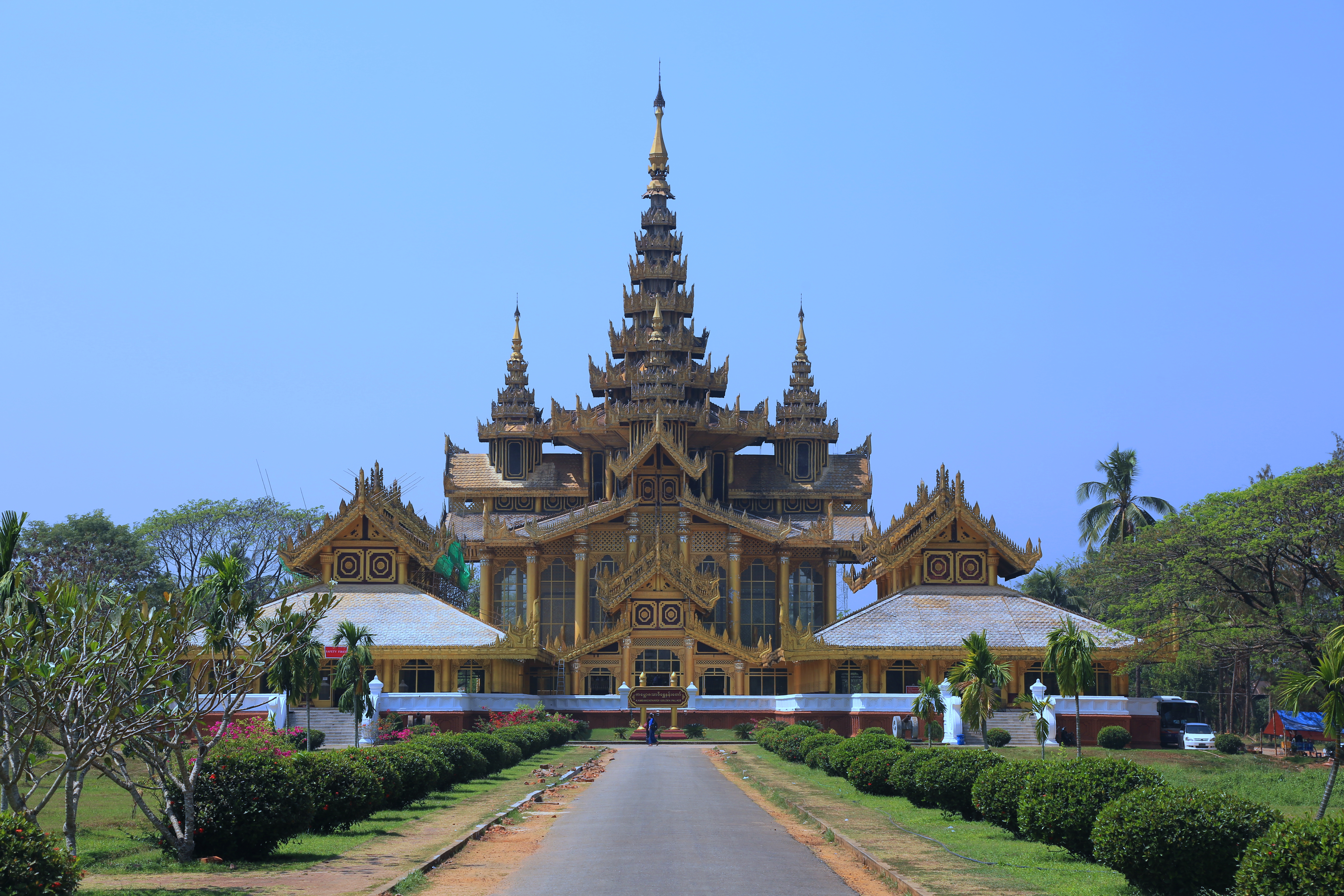
Kanbawzathadi Palace

The city remained the capital until the kingdom's fall in 1538. The ascendant Toungoo dynasty under Tabinshwehti made numerous raids that the much larger kingdom could not muster its resources against. While the kingdom would have a brief resurgence for 2 years in the 1550s, Tabinshwehti's successor Bayinnaung would firmly come to control Bago in 1553.

In late 1553, Bago was proclaimed the new capital with commissioning of a new palace, the Kanbawzathadi Palace and Bayinnaung's coronation itself in January 1554. Over the next decade, Bago gradually become the capital of more land and eventually the largest empire in Indochina.

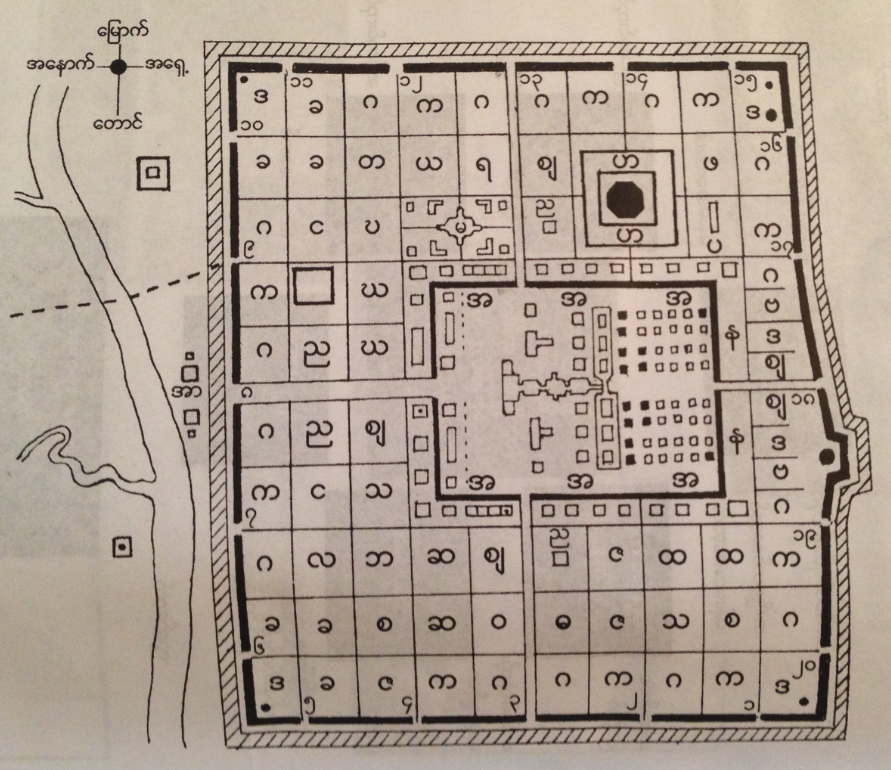
Plan of the city of Pegu (Bago), 1568

After the 1565 rebellion by resettled Shans in Pegu, he faced no new rebellions for the next two years (1565–1567). Because the rebellion burned down major swaths of the capital, including the entire palace complex, he had the capital and the palace rebuilt. The new capital had 20 gates, each named after the vassal who built it. Each gate had a gilded two-tier pyatthat and gilded wooden doors.

Plan of the gates of the newly built Hanthawaddy Pegu, 1568
Northwest	Ayutthaya	Tenasserim	Martaban	Pakhan	Bassein	Northeast
Theinni						Prome
Tharrawaddy						Ava
Nyaungshwe						Toungoo
Mone						Dala
Kale						Lan Xang
Southwest	Tavoy	Mogaung	Mohnyin	Momeik	Chiang Mai	Southeast

The newly rebuilt Kanbawzathadi Palace was officially opened on 16 March 1568, with every vassal ruler present. He even gave upgraded titles to four former kings living in Pegu: Mobye Narapati of Ava, Sithu Kyawhtin of Ava, Mekuti of Lan Na, and Maha Chakkraphat of Siam.

As a major seaport, the city was frequently visited by Europeans, among these, Gasparo Balbi and Ralph Fitch in the late 1500s. The Europeans often commented on its magnificence. Pegu also established maritime links with the Ottomans by 1545.

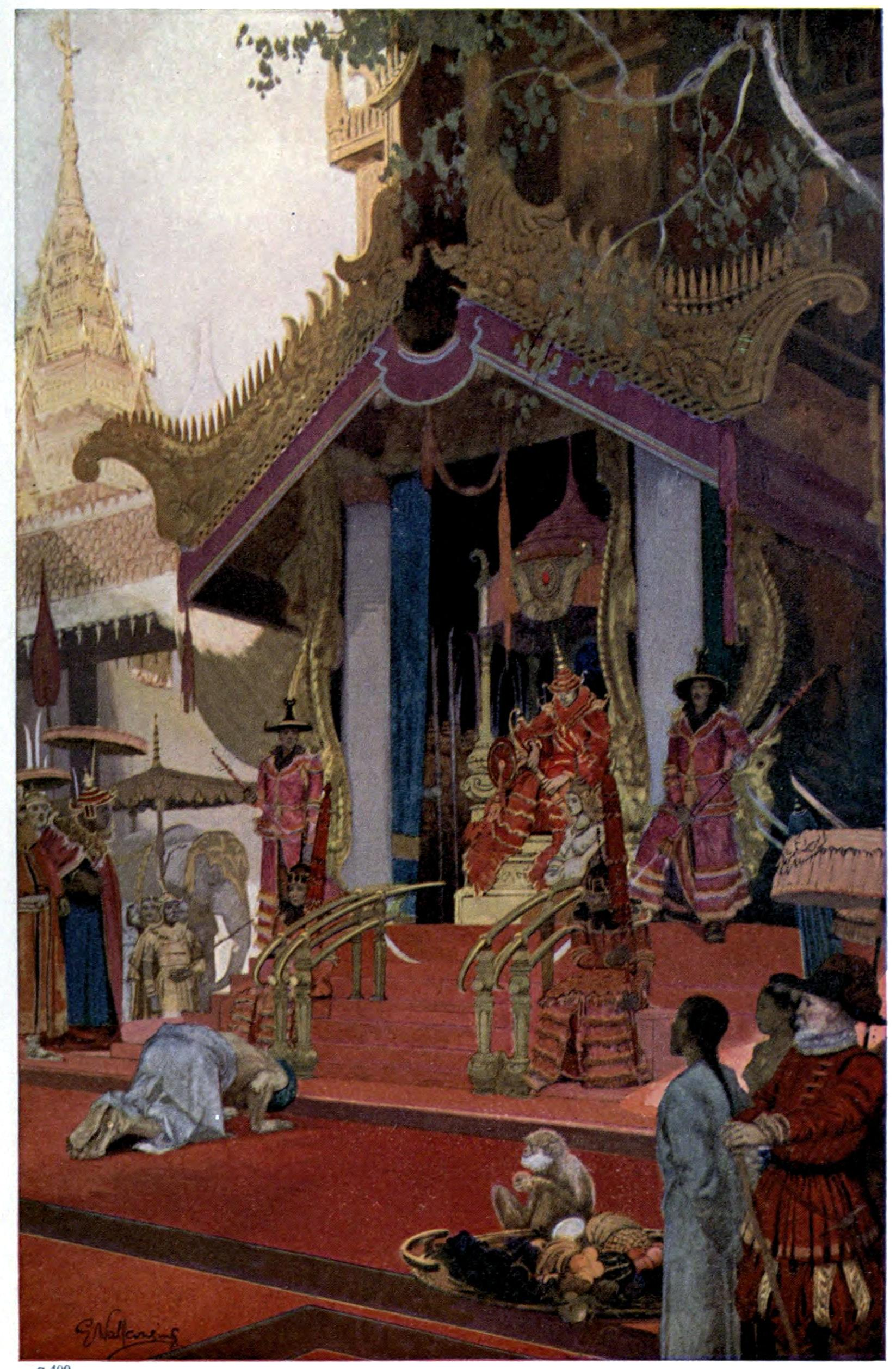
The king of Pegu receives an envoy (17th century)

The Portuguese conquest of Pegu, following the destruction caused by the kings of Tangot and Arrakan in 1599, was described by Manuel de Abreu Mousinho in the account called "Brief narrative telling the conquest of Pegu in eastern India made by the Portuguese in the time of the viceroy Aires de Saldanha, being captain Salvador Ribeiro de Sousa, called Massinga, born in Guimarães, elected as their king by the natives in the year 1600", published by Fernão Mendes Pinto in the 18th century. The 1599 destruction of the city and the crumbling authority of Bayinnaung's successor Nanda Bayin saw the Toungoo dynasty flee their capital to Ava.

The capital was looted by the viceroy of Toungoo, Minye Thihathu II of Toungoo, and then burned by the viceroy of Arakan during the Burmese–Siamese War (1594–1605). Anaukpetlun wanted to rebuild Hongsawadi and the glories of Bago, which had been deserted since Nanda Bayin had abandoned it. He was only able to build a temporary palace, however.

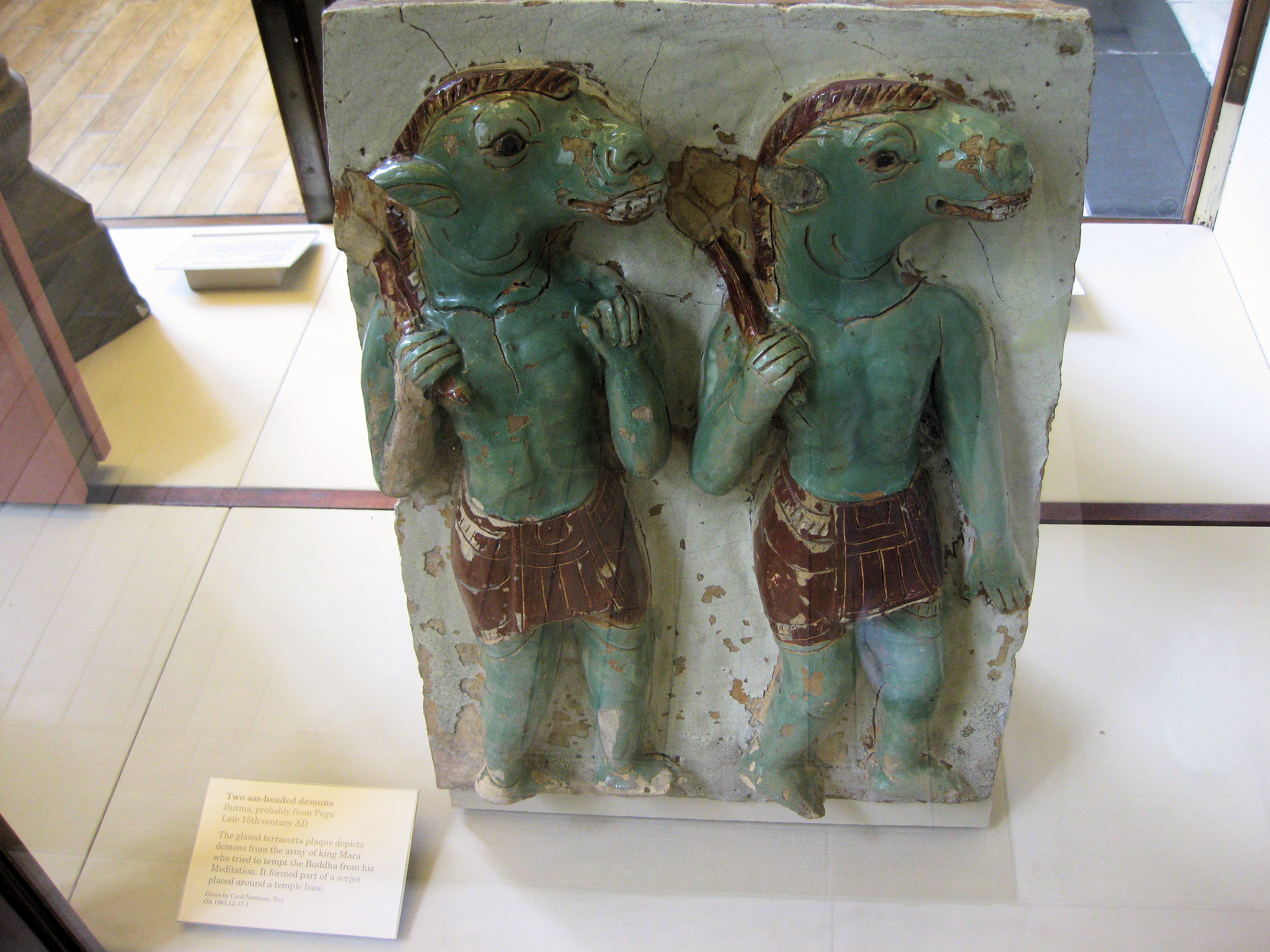
Glazed plaque of demons representing the army of King Mara from the Shwegugyi pagoda at Pegu constructed by King Dhammazedi (1472–92) and now in the British Museum's collection

The Burmese capital's return to Bago was short lived as the royal capital was once again relocated to Ava in 1634 by the next king Thalun to focus on the core of the smaller Burmese empire.

=== The fall of the Toungoo and Konbaung dynasty ===
In 1740, the Mon revolted and founded the Restored Hanthawaddy Kingdom. However, a Bamar king, Alaungpaya, captured the city in May 1757.

Bago was rebuilt by King Bodawpaya (r. 1782–1819), but by then the river had shifted course, cutting the city off from the sea. It never regained its previous importance. After the Second Anglo-Burmese War, the British annexed Bago in 1852. In 1862, the province of British Burma was formed, and the capital moved to Yangon. The substantial differences between the colloquial and literary pronunciations, as with Burmese words, was a reason of the British corruption "Pegu".

In 1911, Hanthawaddy was described as a district in the Bago (or Pegu) division of Lower Burma. It lay in the home district of Yangon, from which the town was detached to make a separate district in 1880. It had an area of 3,023 square miles (7,830 km^{2}), with a population of 48,411 in 1901, showing an increase of 22% in the past decade. Hanthawaddy and Hinthada were the two most densely populated districts in the province.

Hanthawaddy, as it was constituted in 1911, consisted of a vast plain stretching up from the sea between the mouth of the Irrawaddy River and the Pegu Range. Except the tract of land lying between the Pegu Range on the east and the Yangon River, the country was intersected by numerous tidal creeks, many of which were navigable by large boats and some by steamers. The headquarters of the district was in Rangoon, which was also the sub-divisional headquarters. The second sub-division had its headquarters at Insein, where there were large railway works. Cultivation was almost wholly confined to rice, but there were many vegetable and fruit gardens.

Bago was severely damaged during earthquakes in May and December 1930. The May earthquake killed at least 500 people and triggered a tsunami.

=== Modern history ===
Today, Hanthawaddy is one of the wards of Bago's city proper. The town of Bago is subdivided into 34 wards. On 9 April 2021, during the Myanmar protests, Bago became the site of the Bago massacre, during which military forces killed at least 82 civilians following a protest crackdown.

== Demographics ==
The 2014 Myanmar census reported that Bago had a population of 237,619, representing 48.35% of Bago Township's total population.

As of 2019, the urban town has 179,505 people based on the General Administration Department's estimates. 88.73% of the Township is Bamar with a significant Karen, Mon, Palaung and Burmese Indian population. Buddhists make up 94.2% of the city with Christianity being the second most populous at 4.2%. There are 749 monasteries, 92 nunneries and 134 stupas of various sizes including the tallest pagoda in Myanmar, the Shwemawdaw Pagoda. The city also has 9 churches, 6 mosques, 16 Hindu temples and 3 Chinese Mahayana temples.

== Economy and transport ==
The main industries of Bago are agriculture and service sector employment. Bago city has an industrial zone with several factories, mostly in textiles and shoe-making. Smaller factories and workshops within the city also create food products, plastics, electric meters, motors, wood products, tea and halwa. Bago also has a small, but thriving tourism industry with many tourists from nearby Yangon. The Bago Development Committee manages 11 markets around the city.

There are no airports within the township, and the city is served mostly by Yangon International Airport but the proposed Hanthawaddy International Airport serving Yangon and Bago may be located within Bago Township. There are two rail lines that pass through Bago, Yangon–Mandalay Railway and Yangon–Mawlamyine Railway. Bago also has several bus depots on its outskirts with intercity buses providing regular service. Bago is served by the Yangon–Mandalay Expressway as well as the old highways going to Taungoo and Myeik. Bago has seven major bridges crossing the Bago River in and around the city.

== Climate ==
Bago has a tropical monsoon climate (Köppen Am), similar to most of coastal Myanmar, with a hot, dry season from mid-November to mid-April and a, hot, extremely humid, and exceedingly rainy wet season from May to October.

Climate data for Bago, Myanmar (1991–2020)
Month	Jan	Feb	Mar	Apr	May	Jun	Jul	Aug	Sep	Oct	Nov	Dec	Year
Mean daily maximum °C (°F)	31.7 (89.1)	34.0 (93.2)	36.3 (97.3)	37.9 (100.2)	34.6 (94.3)	30.9 (87.6)	30.1 (86.2)	30.0 (86.0)	31.1 (88.0)	32.6 (90.7)	32.7 (90.9)	31.5 (88.7)	32.8 (91.0)
Daily mean °C (°F)	24.0 (75.2)	25.8 (78.4)	28.5 (83.3)	30.6 (87.1)	29.1 (84.4)	26.9 (80.4)	26.5 (79.7)	26.5 (79.7)	27.1 (80.8)	27.8 (82.0)	26.9 (80.4)	24.5 (76.1)	27 (81)
Mean daily minimum °C (°F)	16.3 (61.3)	17.6 (63.7)	20.7 (69.3)	23.3 (73.9)	23.6 (74.5)	23.0 (73.4)	22.9 (73.2)	22.9 (73.2)	23.1 (73.6)	23.1 (73.6)	21.2 (70.2)	17.6 (63.7)	21.3 (70.3)
Average precipitation mm (inches)	5.0 (0.20)	3.1 (0.12)	15.2 (0.60)	38.5 (1.52)	333.9 (13.15)	640.5 (25.22)	803.4 (31.63)	720.9 (28.38)	475.3 (18.71)	188.0 (7.40)	50.2 (1.98)	7.5 (0.30)	3,281.5 (129.19)
Average precipitation days (≥ 1.0 mm)	0.8	0.3	1.1	2.2	15.2	26.3	28.3	28.0	22.7	12.4	3.2	0.5	140.8
Source: World Meteorological Organization

== Places of interest ==
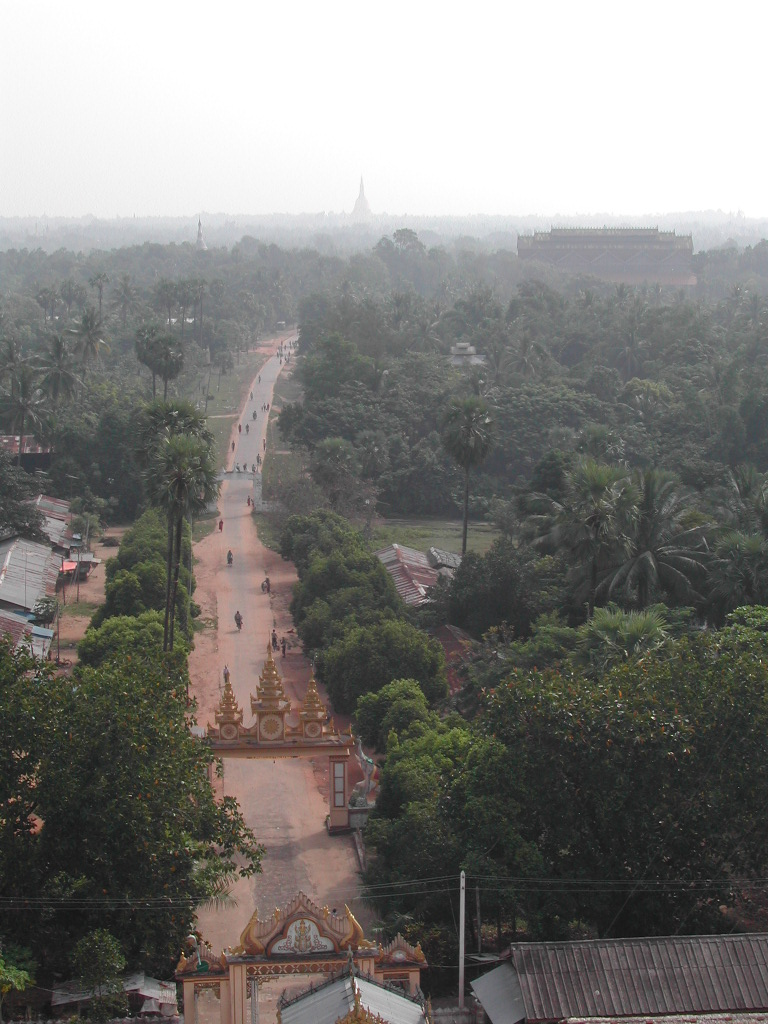
View from Mahazedi Pagoda

- Shwethalyaung Buddha (Reclining Buddha)
- Shwemawdaw Pagoda
- Kyaikpun Buddha
- Kanbawzathadi Palace site and museum
- Kalyani Ordination Hall
- Mahazedi Pagoda
- Shwegugyi Pagoda
- Shwegugale Pagoda
- Bago Sittaung Canal
- Butterfly lake (Lake-pyar-kan)
- Mazin Dam
- Snake Monastery
- Bago Moat

== Sports ==
Bago has a 400 meter football field and 1 public fitness center.

- Grand Royal Stadium

== Healthcare ==
The most common illness within the Township is diarrhea. Between 2017 and 2018, Bago Township saw 617 cases of HIV leading to 16 deaths.

- Bago General Hospital (500-bedded Public Hospital)
- Bago Traditional Medicine Hospital
- Aung Hospital
- Swal Taw Hospital
- Joe Thein Hospital
- Thamar Di Hospital

== Education ==
Bago also has 9 high schools and a university. Bago's larger high schools have branches within the city. There are 28 monastic schools within the Township. Bago has a school attendance rate of 99.82% and 33% attendance rate for university. Overall, the literacy rate is 99.55%.

- Bago University
- Basic Education High School No. 1 Bago
- Basic Education High School No. 3 Bago

== Bibliography ==
- Aung-Thwin, Michael A. (2005). The Mists of Rāmañña: The Legend that was Lower Burma (illustrated ed.). Honolulu: University of Hawai'i Press. ISBN 9780824828868.
- Aung-Thwin, Michael A. (2017). Myanmar in the Fifteenth Century. Honolulu: University of Hawai'i Press. ISBN 978-0-8248-6783-6.
- Nyein Maung, ed. (1972–1998). Shay-haung Myanma Kyauksa-mya [Ancient Burmese Stone Inscriptions] (in Burmese). Vol. 1–5. Yangon: Archaeological Department.
- Pan Hla, Nai (1968). Razadarit Ayedawbon (in Burmese) (8th printing, 2005 ed.). Yangon: Armanthit Sarpay.
- Phayre, Major-General Sir Arthur P. (1873). "The History of Pegu". Journal of the Asiatic Society of Bengal. 42. Calcutta: 23–57, 120–159.
- Phayre, Lt. Gen. Sir Arthur P. (1883). History of Burma (1967 ed.). London: Susil Gupta.
- Schmidt, P.W. (1906). "Slapat des Ragawan der Königsgeschichte". Die äthiopischen Handschriften der K.K. Hofbibliothek zu Wien (in German). 151. Vienna: Alfred Hölder.

Bago, Myanmar
Preceded by Donwun	Capital of Hanthawaddy Kingdom; 1369 – by 31 March 1539	Succeeded by End of Kingdom
Preceded by Toungoo	Capital of Burma by 31 March 1539 – 30 April 1550	Succeeded by Ava
Preceded by Founded	Capital of Hanthawaddy Kingdom; June 1550 – 12 March 1552	Succeeded by End of Kingdom
Preceded by Toungoo	Capital of Burma; 12 March 1552 – 19 December 1599	Succeeded by Ava
Preceded by Ava	Capital of Burma; 14 May 1613 – 25 January 1635	Succeeded by Ava
Preceded by Founded	Capital of Restored Hanthawaddy Kingdom; November 1740 – 6 May 1757	Succeeded by End of Kingdom
