= Hamsa (bird) =

Species of aquatic bird mentioned in ancient Indian texts

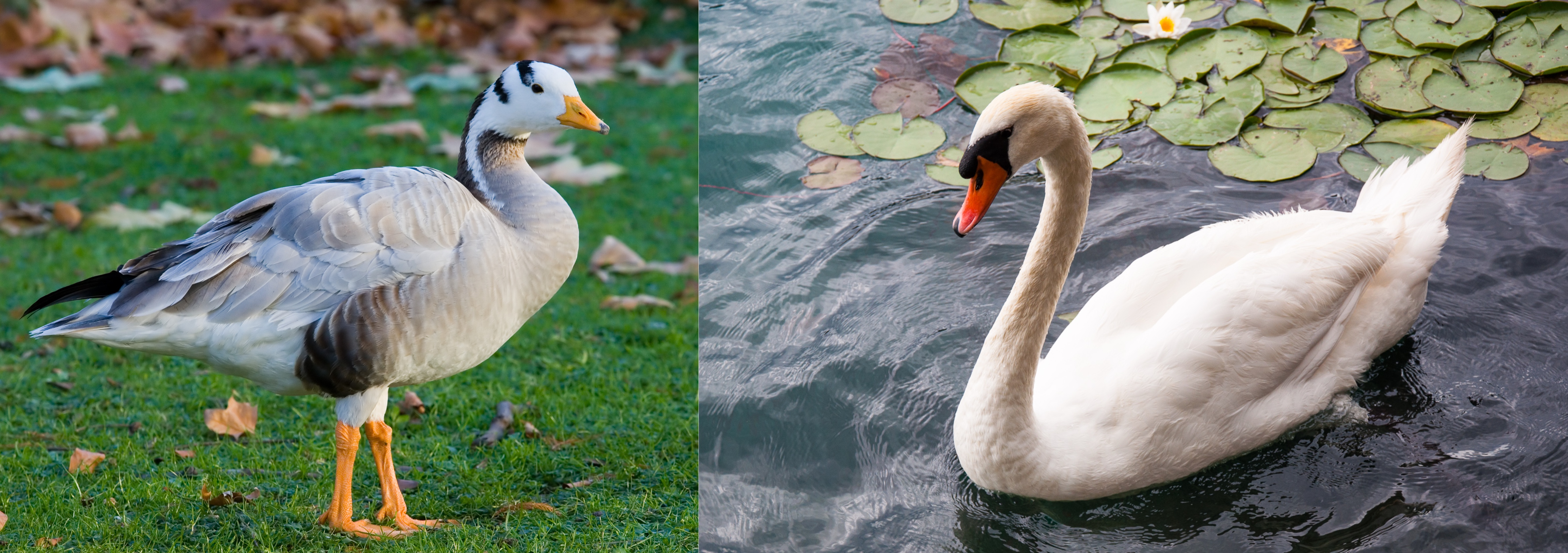
Hamsa is thought to refer to the bar-headed goose found in India (left) or a species of swan.

The haṃsa (Sanskrit: हंस haṃsa or hansa) is an aquatic migratory bird, referred to in ancient Sanskrit texts which various scholars have interpreted as being based on the goose, the swan, or even the flamingo. Its image is used in Indian and Southeast Asian culture as a spiritual symbol and a decorative element. It is also used in a metaphorical sense with the bird attributed with the mythical ability to extract milk from a mixture of milk and water or good from evil. In Hindu iconography, hamsa is the vahana (or vehicle) of Brahma, Gayatri, Saraswati, and Vishvakarma.

== Identification ==
Asian language professor Monier Williams translates the term from Sanskrit as "a goose, gander, swan, flamingo (or other aquatic bird, considered as a bird of passage [migratory bird] ...)." The word is also used for a mythical or poetical bird with knowledge. In the Rig Veda, it is the bird which is able to separate Soma from water, when mixed; in later Indian literature, the bird separates milk from water when mixed. In Indian philosophical literature, hamsa represents the individual soul or spirit (typified by the pure sunlight-white like color of a goose or swan), or the "Universal Soul or Supreme Spirit".

The word Hamsa is cognate with Latin "(h)anser", Greek "χήν", German "Gans", Dutch "gans", English "goose", Spanish "ganso" and Russian "гусь".

== Swan or goose controversy ==
Jean Vogel, in 1952, questioned if hamsa is indeed a swan, because according to Dutch ornithologists George Junge and E.D. van Oort he consulted, swans were rare in modern India while bar-headed geese (Anser indicus) were common. According to Vogel, Western and Indian scholars may have preferred translating hamsa from Sanskrit to swan as the indigenous goose appears plump while the swan (and, Vogel adds, the flamingo) appears more graceful.

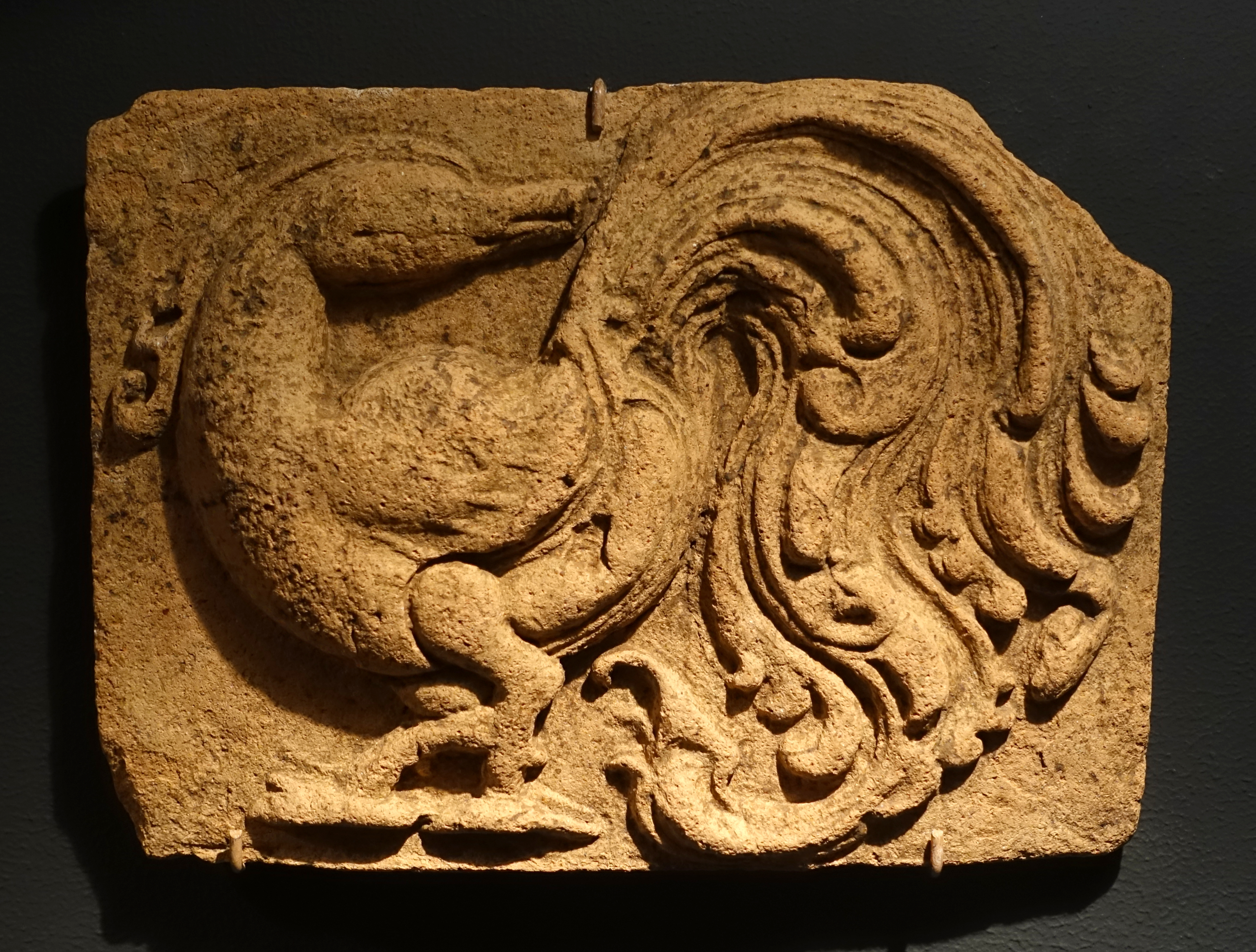
A tile with a hamsa bird with flowery tail from Sri Lanka, c. 12th century CE

Some have criticised Vogel's view as being over-reliant on artistic representations from south India and Sri Lanka, where the white swan is rare. American ornithologist Paul Johnsgard, in 2010, stated that mute swans (Cygnus Olor) do migrate to the northwestern Himalayan region of India every winter, migrating some 1000 miles each way. Similarly, the British ornithologist Peter Scott, in his Key to the Wildfowl of the World (1957), states that northwestern India is one of the winter migration homes for mute swans, the others being Korea and the Black Sea. Grewal, Harvey and Pfister, in 2003, state that the mute swan is "a vagrant mainly in Pakistan but also northwestern India" and include a map marking their distribution. Asad Rahmani and Zafar-ul Islam, in their 2009 book, describe the three species of swans and 39 species of ducks and geese found in India.

Dave stated, "the present position according to Hume is that Swans do not occur anywhere within Indian limits outside the Himalayas except in the extreme North-West", and suggested that they were perhaps more common in the "hoary past."

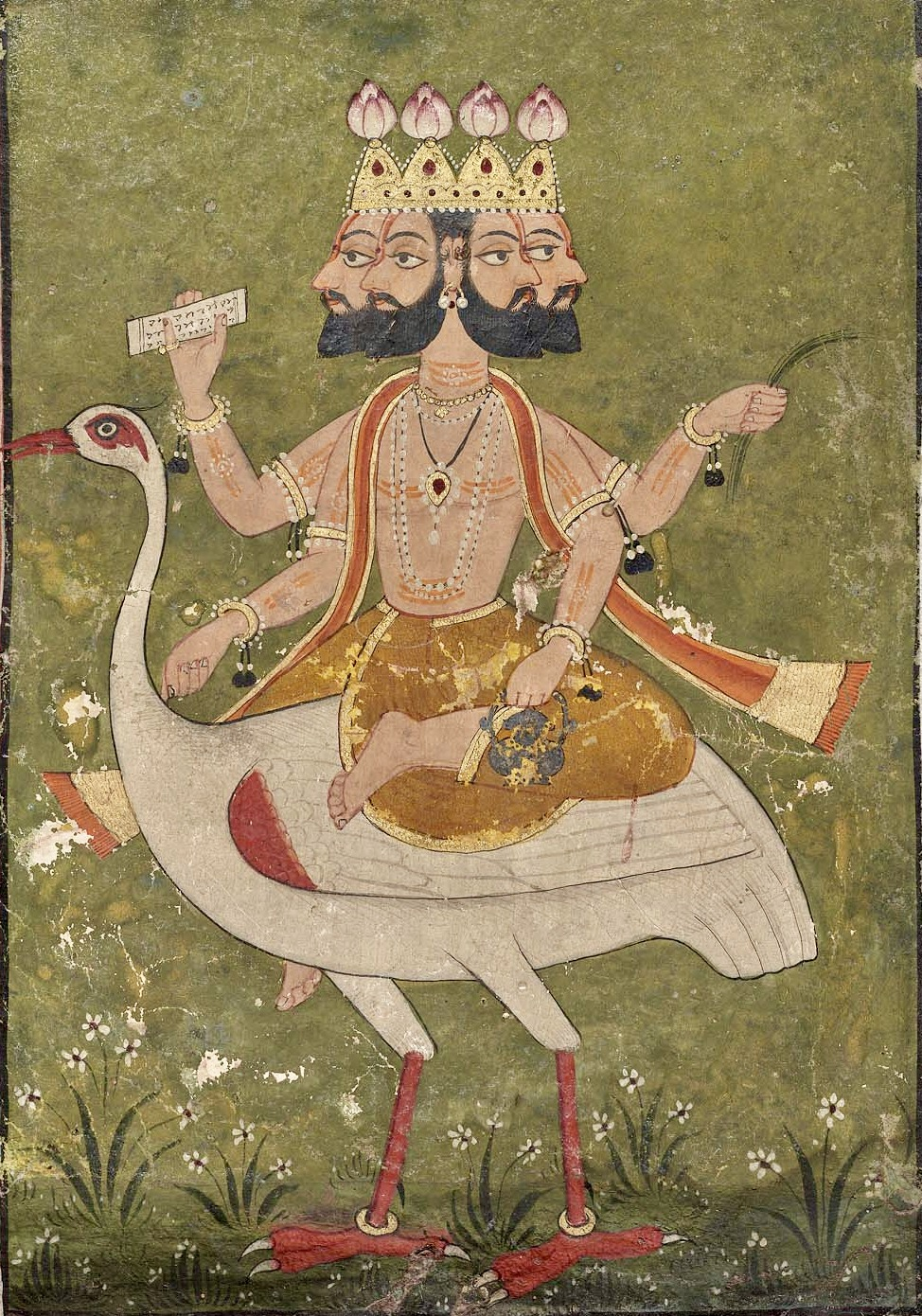
Himachal Pradesh painting (c. 1700 CE)

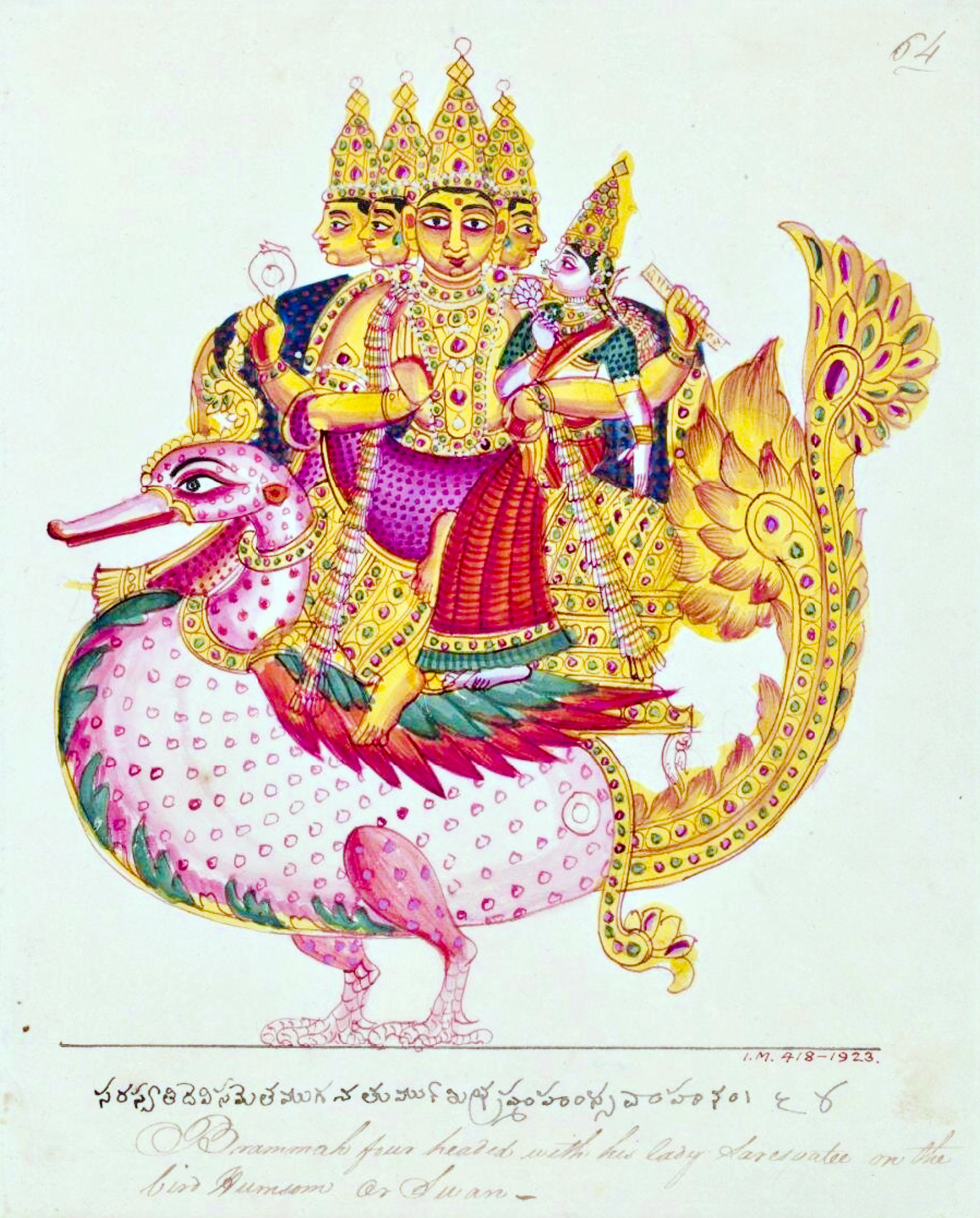
South Indian painting (c. 1825 CE)

Paintings of Brahma on a hamsa

The hymns of Rigveda, verses in Hindu epics and Puranas, as well as other early Indian texts, states KN Dave, mention a variety of birds with the root of hamsa (हंस), such as Maha-hamsa, Raj-hamsa, Kal-hamsa and others. These should be identified as members of the Anatidae family, namely swans, geese or ducks. This identification is based on the details provided in the Sanskrit texts about the changes in plumage over the bird's life, described call, migratory habits, courtship rituals and flying patterns. Specific examples where "hamsa" should be interpreted as "swan" include hymns 1.163, 3.8, 4.45, 8.35, 9.32 and others in the Rigveda, verse 7.339 of Ramayana manjari, chapter 30.56 of Skanda Purana, chapter 101.27 of the Padma Purana, and others. Dave also lists examples of Indian texts where "hamsa" should be interpreted as "goose". Some Sanskrit texts, states Dave, distinguish between "hamsa" and "kadamb", the former according to him being a swan and the latter a bar-headed goose.

The Indian ornithologist Salim Ali stated in his Azad Memorial Lecture of 1979 that Sanskrit names for birds were based on their calls, coloration, habits, gait, method of feeding or other observed traits. However, these are sometimes difficult to assign unambiguously to species. He mentions 4th to 5th-century Kalidasa's poem about Lake Manasa. This Manasa, assumes Salim Ali, is Lake Manasarovar and then states that the hamsa birds therein should be interpreted as bar-headed geese that do migrate over the Himalayas from Tibet. The historic Sanskrit and Prakrit literature of India does not mention the location of the lake Manasa that they consider the natural abode of the hamsa.

Ethno-ornithologists Sonia Tidemann and Andrew Gosler in Ethno-ornithology: Birds, Indigenous Peoples, Culture and Society state that hamsa has been identified as "swans" in early Indian texts, and that titles such as Raja-hamsa were applied to ascetics and holy-men in Indian culture because ancient Hindu and Buddhist stories ascribed the ability to separate good from evil to the hamsa.

The birds painted at the Ajanta Caves in central India (Maharashtra) on the Hamsa Jataka, as well as those in Sanchi resemble a swan (and a series of swans in one panel), states the art historian C. Sivaramamurti. These early Buddhist arts can be dated between the 3rd century BCE and 5th century CE. The text of the Jataka itself clearly describes white swans that are like clouds in a blue sky.

According to Nanditha Krishna, the hamsa in the early north Indian tradition is best identified as a swan as the mythical symbol of wisdom. However, the hamsa became a popular motif included in temple artwork, textile prints and other artworks. It became a highly stylized mythical bird, with a plump body and short neck, along with flowery beak and tail, one that looks more like a goose.

== In Hinduism ==
The hamsa is often identified with the Supreme Spirit, Ultimate Reality or Brahman in Hinduism. The flight of the hamsa symbolizes moksha, the release from the cycle of birth, death, and reincarnation known as samsara.

The hamsa is also the vahana (mount) of Saraswati, the goddess of knowledge and creative arts, Brahma, the god of creation and one of the Trideva (Hindu trinity), and Gayatri, the goddess of vedas.

=== Paramahamsa ===
In view of the association of the hamsa with several attributes as indicated above, Hindu rishis (sages) and sadhus (Hindu ascetic or holy person) have been given the title of paramahamsa, that is, the supreme hamsa. It connotes a particular person who has reached a high level of spirituality.

For example, Paramahamsa Upanishad calls that yogi a Paramahamsa who is neither opinionated nor affected by defamation, nor jealous, not a show off, is humble, and is oblivious to all the human frailties. He is immune to the existence of his body, which he treats as a corpse. He is beyond false pretensions and lives realizing the Brahman. In chapter 3, the Paramahamsa Upanishad states that the one who understands the difference between "staff of knowledge" and "staff of wood", is a Paramahamsa.

He does not fear pain, nor longs for pleasure.
He forsakes love. He is not attached to the pleasant, nor to the unpleasant.
He does not hate. He does not rejoice.

Firmly fixed in knowledge, his Self is content, well-established within.
He is called the true Yogin. He is a knower.

His consciousness is permeated with that, the perfect bliss.
That Brahman I am, he knows it. He has that goal achieved.

— Paramahamsa Upanishad, Chapter 4 (Abridged),

=== In Indian text ===
Hamsa, or hansa, are part of Indian text. Arayanna, or heavenly hamsa (swans), are said to live in Manasasaras in the Himalayas. They are mentioned in the Hindu epic, the Ramayana. Hamsa, the swan, is part of the mythical love story of Nala and Damayanti, where it carries the stories, historical information and messages between the two strangers.

In Indian text, it is said to eat pearls and separate milk from water from a mixture of the two. Charles Lanman states that the references to hamsa being able to separate or discriminate is used primarily in a metaphorical sense in Sanskrit poetry. One possibility is the belief that the milk refers to the sap exuded from the stems of lotuses (kshira). The other, states Lanman, is that "the swan, goose, duck and flamingo have a series of lamellae which serve as a sieve for straining their food from the water that they take in". Thus, it may be referring to the bird's ability to extract the nourishing part from a mixture.

== Buddhism ==
The hamsa was also used extensively in the art of Gandhara, in conjunction with images of the Shakyamuni Buddha. Nanditha Krishna translates this as swan, in the Gandharan context. Martin Lerner and Steven Kossak identify a 2nd-century BCE Gandharan relief now in the collection of the Metropolitan Museum of Art (New York, item 1987.142.212) that shows a swan with a rider.

The hamsa is deemed sacred in the Buddhism, as a symbol of wisdom. Some scholars such as Donald Swearer translate it as swan, others such as Thien Chou as goose. In historic Nepalese art, hamsa are either sketched as a swan or goose-like bird, while in historic Tibetan artwork it appears as goose-like bird likely reflecting the Indian region from where the Tibetan monks borrowed their iconography.

== Contemporary usage ==
The name in other languages in which it is culturally important are Hindi: hans, Kannada: "ಹಂಸ", Telugu: హంస, hamsa Tamil: அன்னப்பறவை Aṉṉappaṟavai; Khmer: ហង្ស, hong; Burmese: ဟင်္သာ, IPA: [hɪ́ɰ̃θà], and commonly spelt hintha or hinthar; Mon: ဟံသာ (ၜိုပ်), Mon pronunciation: [hɔŋsa] or hongsa; Shan: ႁင်းသႃႇ, Shan pronunciation: [haŋ˦ sʰaː˨] or hangsa; Thai: hong (หงส์), Thai pronunciation: [hǒŋ]. It is also borrowed into Malay angsa (Jawi: اڠسا), though modern definitions provided by dictionaries of its present literary standards differ: the Malaysian dictionary Kamus Dewan defines this specifically to the Anser genus especially A. albifrons whereas the Indonesian counterpart Kamus Besar Bahasa Indonesia defines this towards Cygnus, both mirroring Monier's varied interpretations of the original Sanskrit word itself.

The hintha (equivalent to hamsa) is widely depicted in Burmese art, considered to be a ruddy shelduck in its culture, and has been adopted as the symbol of the Mon people. In parts of Myanmar, the hintha iconography is more like a hen than a duck, reflecting the local fauna.

== Gallery ==
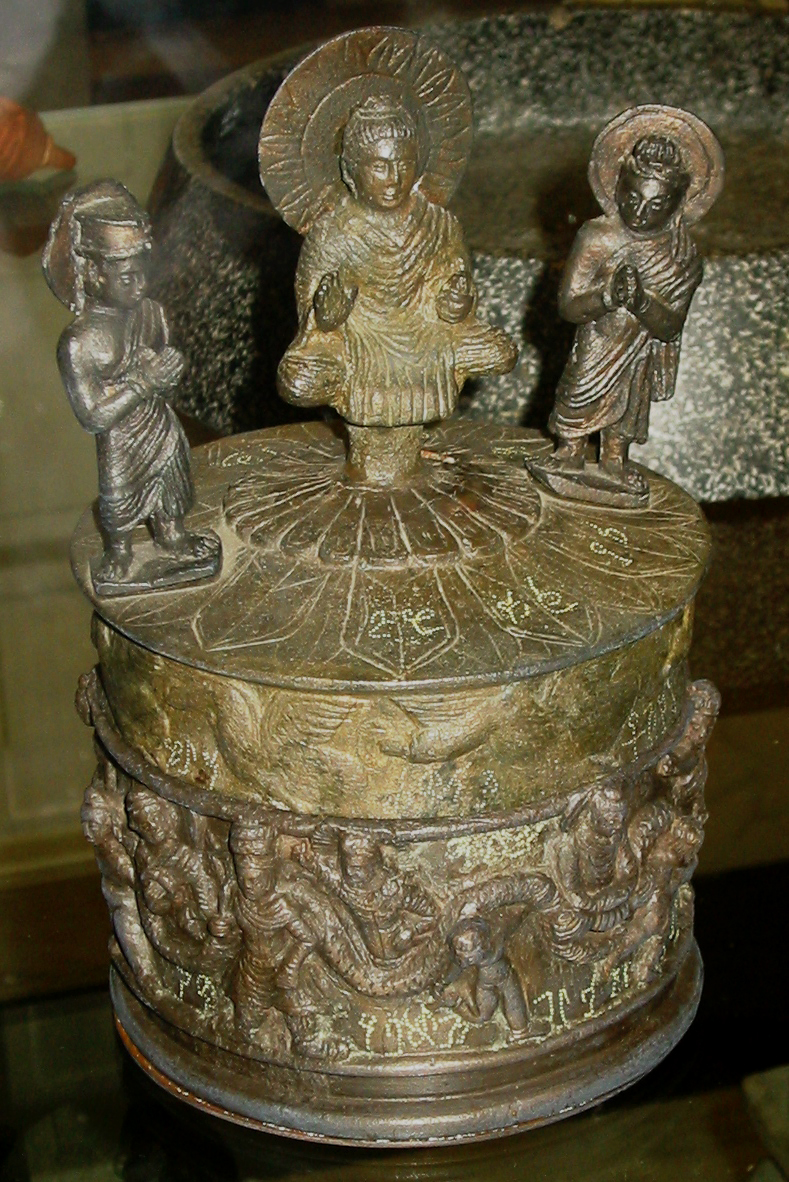
Hamsa border on the Kanishka casket, 2nd century CE

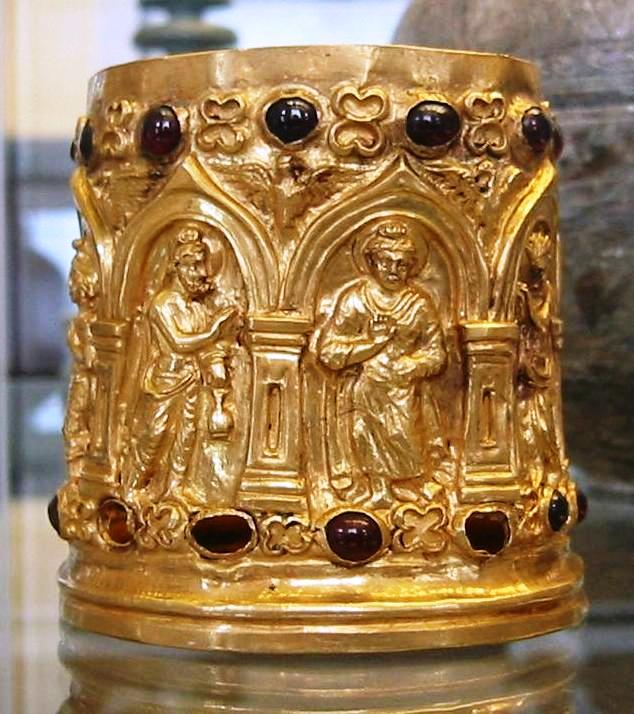
Hamsa birds between the architectural spires on the Bimaran casket, 1st century CE

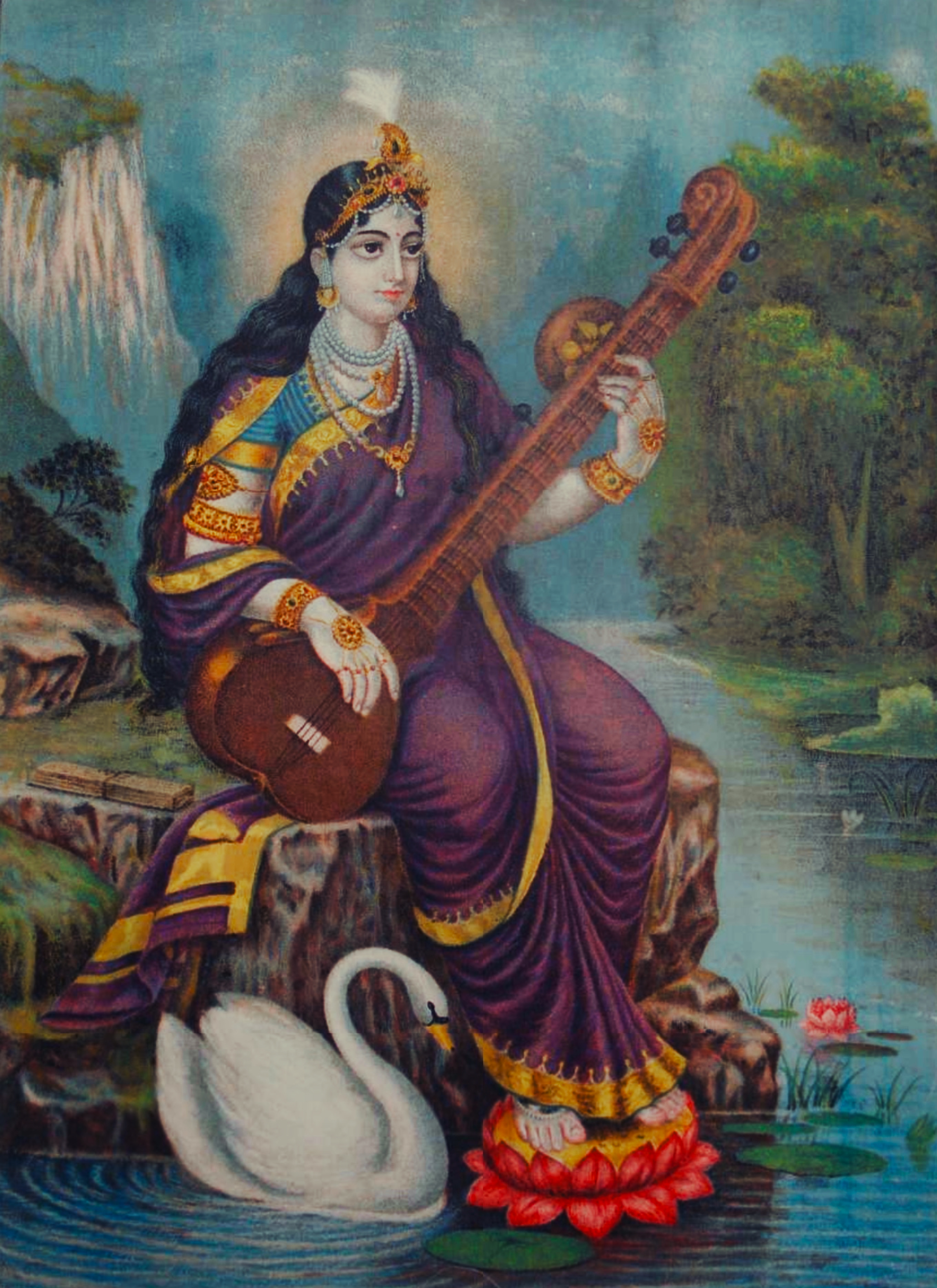
Saraswati with a hamsa (c. 1895, British Library)

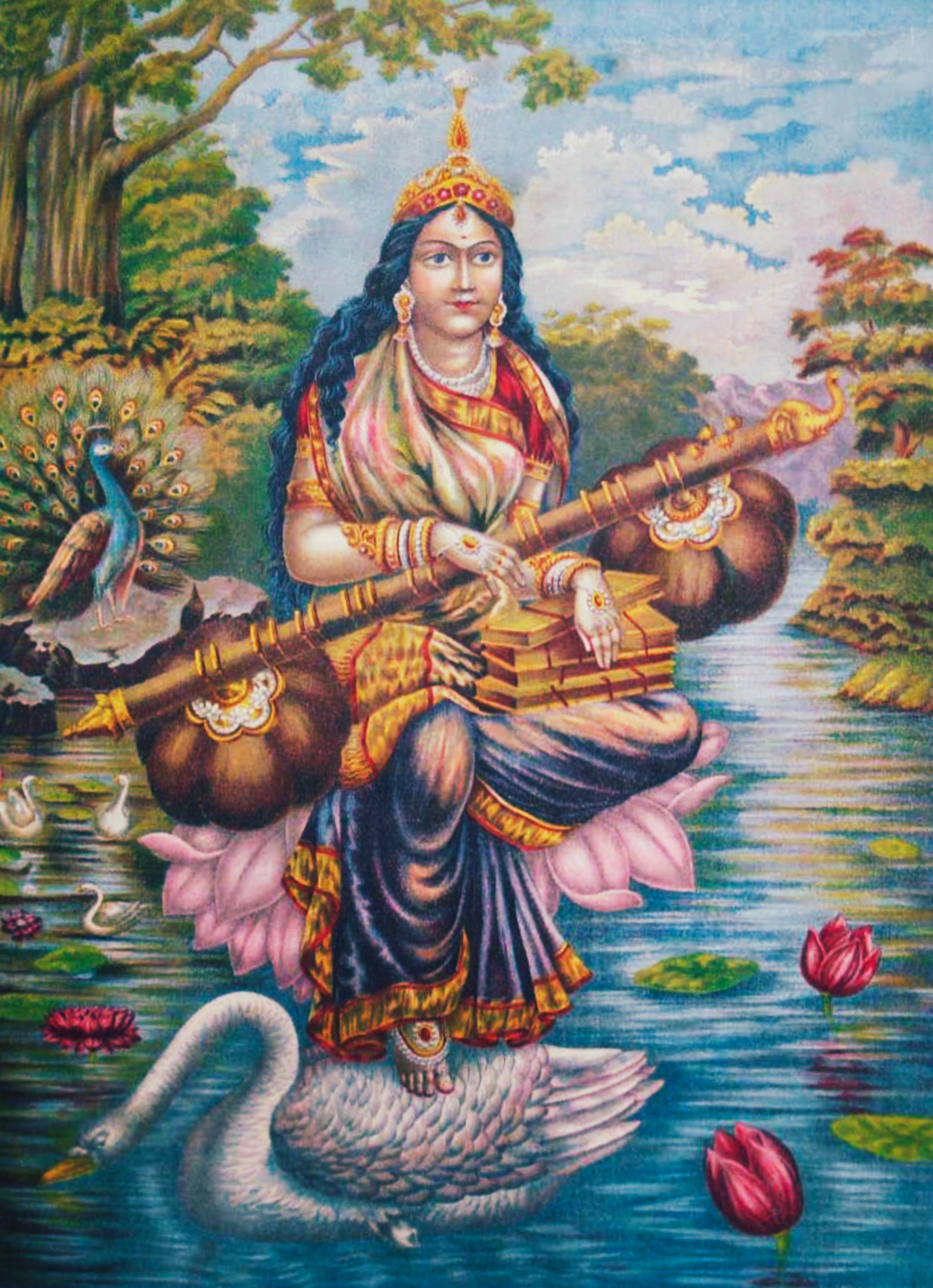
Sarasvati with a hamsa (19th-century, British Library)

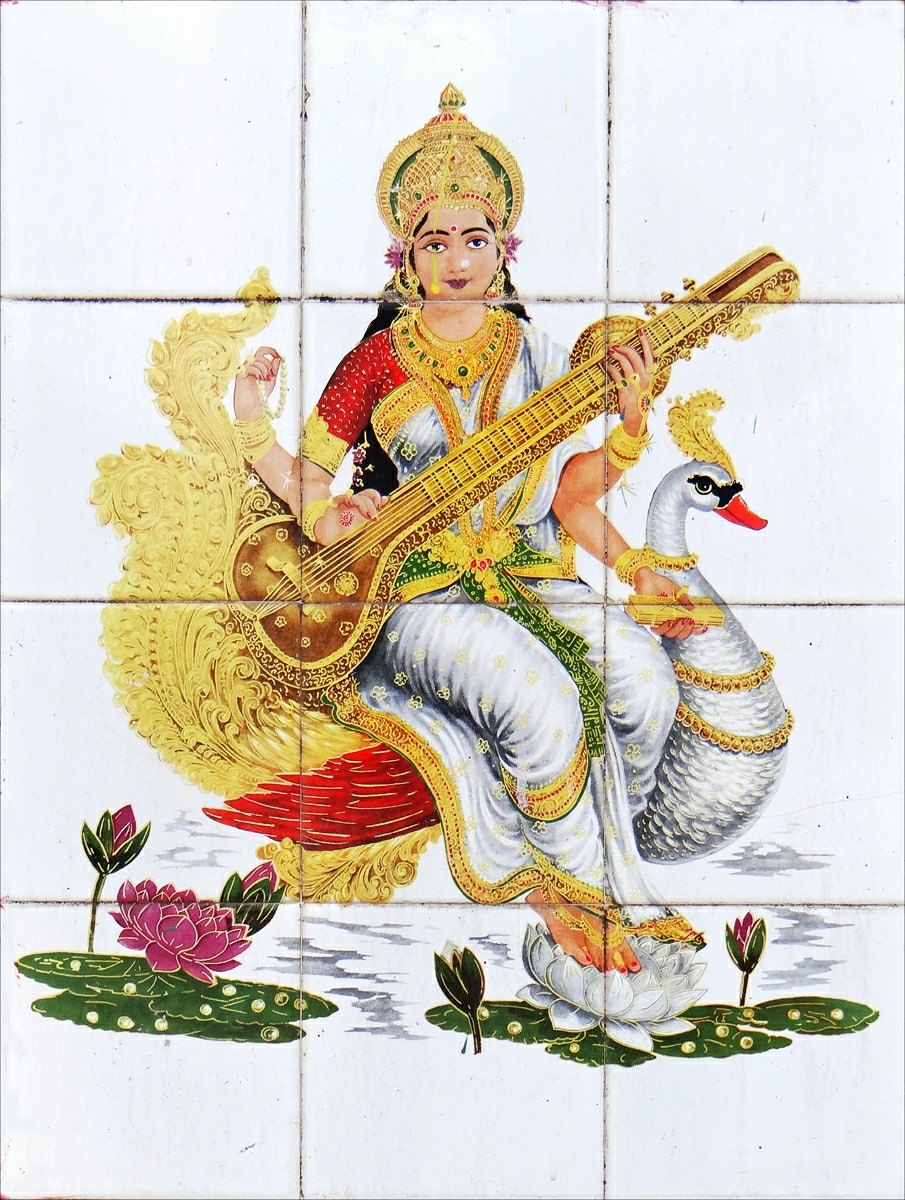
Sarasvati and a hamsa (Kerala tile)

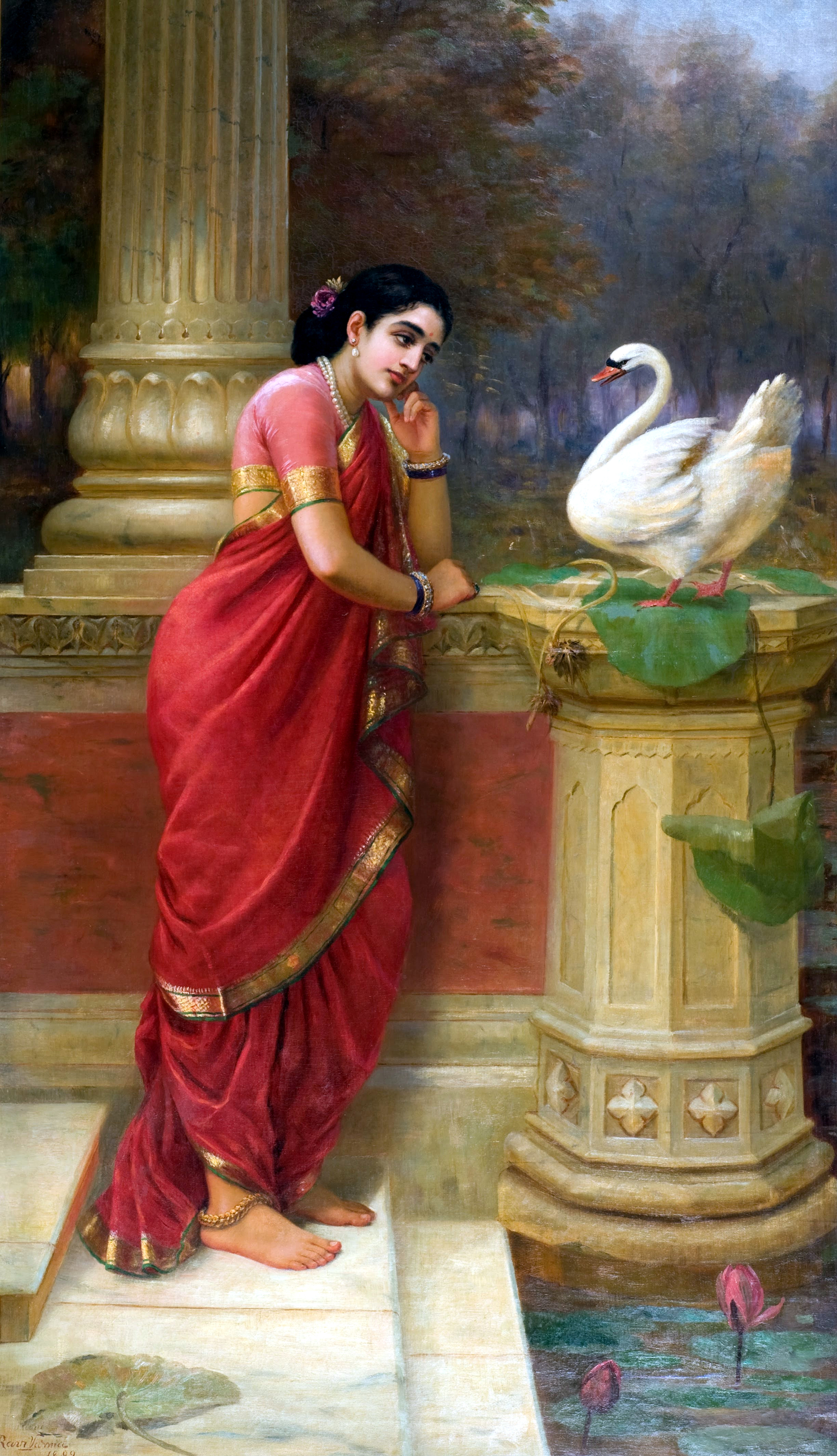
Hamsa talking to Damayanti as depicted by Raja Ravi Varma (19th century)
