= Irrawaddy River =

River in Myanmar

Irrawaddy River ဧရာဝတီမြစ်
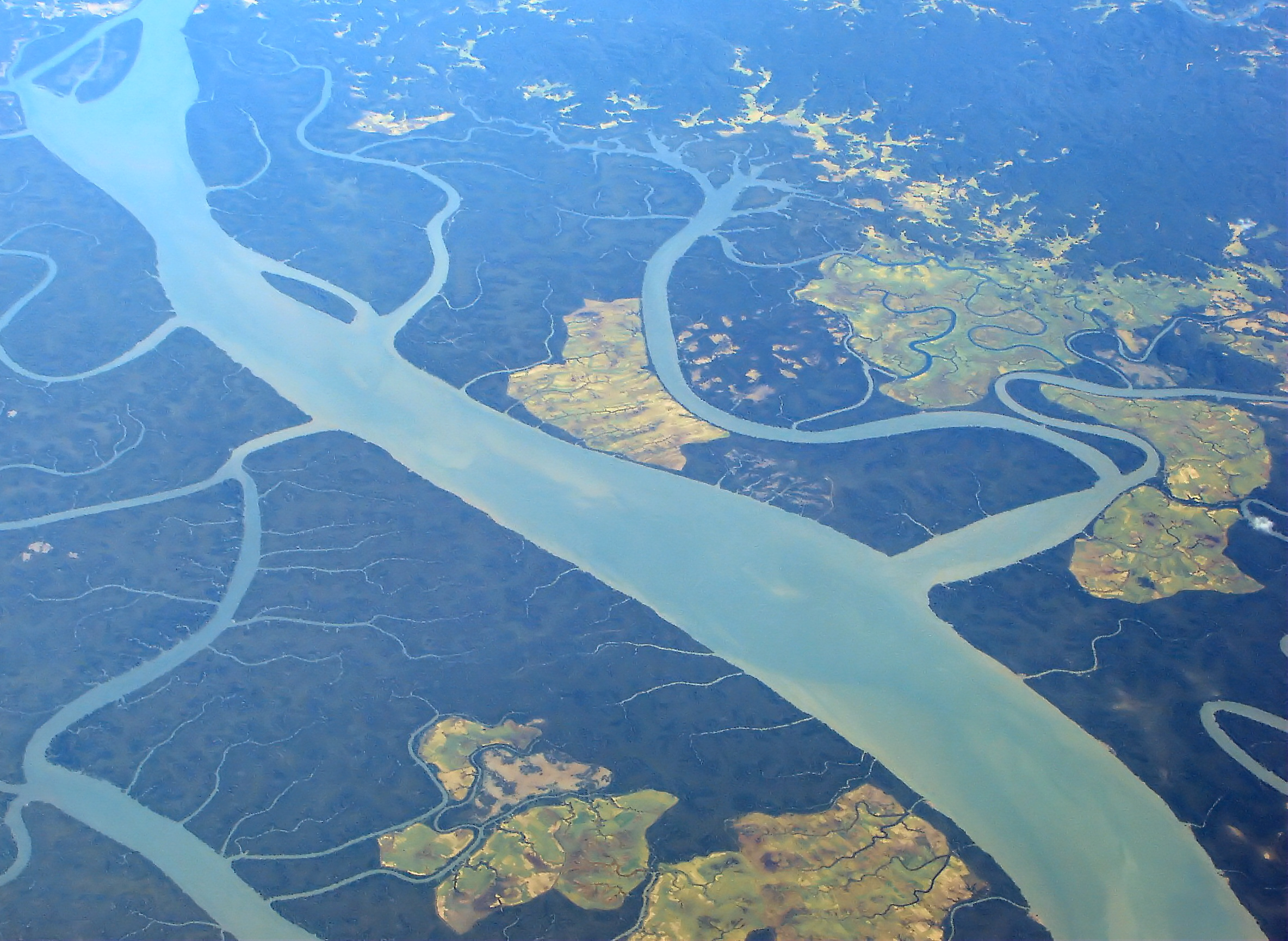
- Aerial view of the river

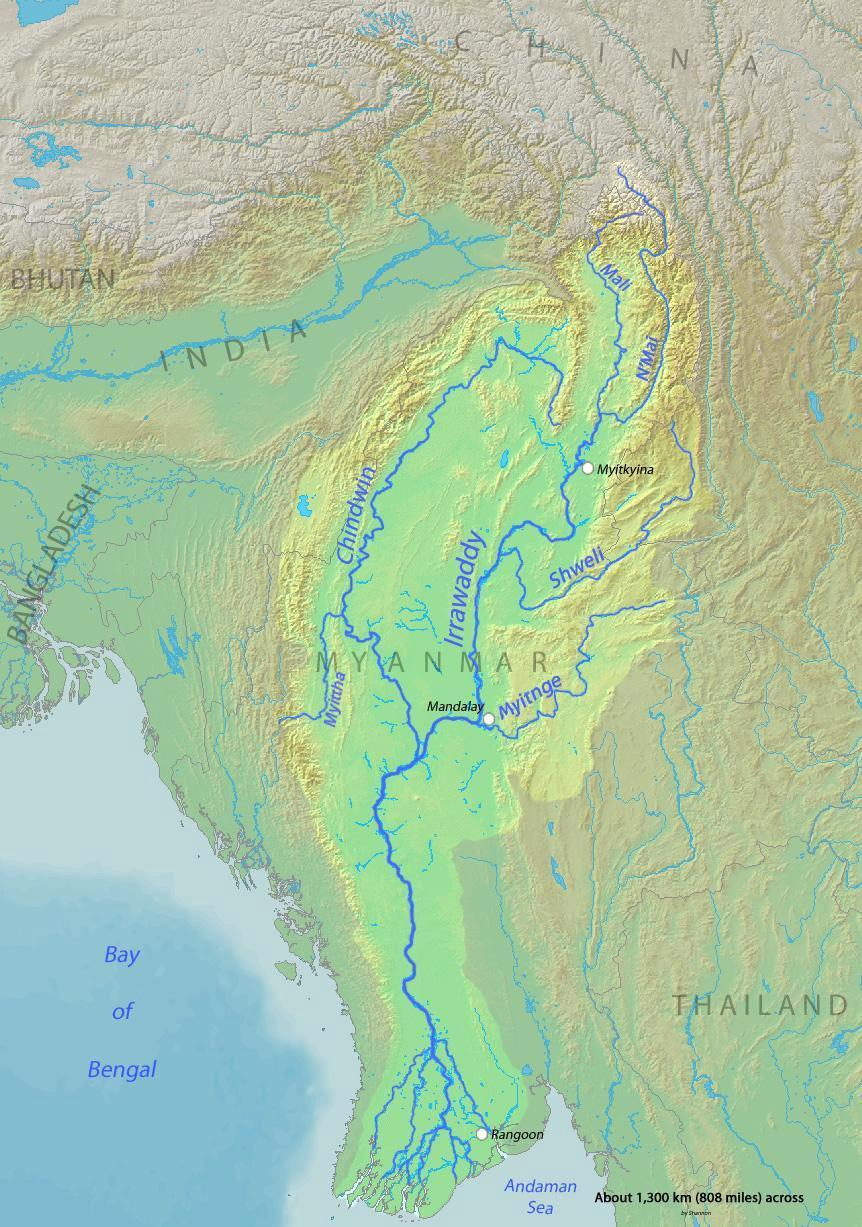
- Course, watershed, cities and major tributaries of the Irrawaddy River

Location
- Country: Myanmar
- States/Regions: Kachin; Mandalay; Sagaing; Magway; Bago; Ayeyarwady
- Cities: Myitkyina; Bhamo; Mandalay; Sagaing; Pakokku; Bagan; Magway; Pyay; Hinthada

Physical characteristics
- Source: N'Mai River
  - location: Kachin State, Myanmar
  - coordinates: 28°31′50″N 97°37′55″E (approximately)
  - elevation: 4650 m (approximately)
- 2nd source: Mali River
  - location: Kachin State, Myanmar
  - coordinates: 27°44′48″N 97°2′5″E (approximately)
  - elevation: 3800 m (approximately)
- Source confluence
  - location: Damphet, Kachin State
  - coordinates: 25°42′0″N 97°30′0″E
  - elevation: 147 m (482 ft)
- Mouth: Andaman Sea
  - location: Ale-ywa, Ayeyarwady Region, Myanmar
  - coordinates: 15°51′19″N 95°14′27″E
  - elevation: 0 m (0 ft)
- Length: 2,288 km (1,422 mi)
- Basin size: 404,200 km^{2} (156,100 sq mi)
- Discharge
  - location: Irrawaddy Delta
  - average: 15,112 m^{3}/s (533,700 cu ft/s)
  - minimum: 2,300 m^{3}/s (81,000 cu ft/s)
  - maximum: 60,000 m^{3}/s (2,100,000 cu ft/s)

Basin features
- Tributaries
  - left: Chindwin River, Mu River
  - right: Myitnge
- Second longest source length: Kaidag Qu/Gadag Qu: 48 km ⟶ Gyita Qu/Kelao Luo: 56 km ⟶ Dulong River: 182 km ⟶ N Mai Kha River: 231 km ⟶ Irrawaddy River: 2,210 km ⟶ Andaman Sea: Total: 2,727 km Longest source length: Quwa Qu/Ridong Ermei ⟶ Gyita Qu/Kelao Luo: 56 km ⟶...

The Irrawaddy River (Burmese: ဧရာဝတီမြစ်, pronounced [ʔèjàwədì mjɪʔ], official romanisation: Ayeyarwady (Note: MLCTS erawa.ti mrac. From Indic revatī, meaning "abounding in riches")) is the principal river of Myanmar, running through the centre of the country. Myanmar's most important commercial waterway, it is about 1,350 mi (2,170 km) long. Originating from the confluence of the N'mai and Mali rivers, it flows from north to south before emptying through the Irrawaddy Delta in the Ayeyarwady Region into the Andaman Sea. Its drainage basin of about 156,000 mi^{2} (400,000 km^{2}) covers 61% of the land area of Burma, and contains five of its largest cities.

As early as the sixth century, the river was used for trade and transport, and an extensive network of irrigation canals was developed to support agriculture. The river is still of great importance as the largest commercial waterway of Myanmar. It also provides important ecosystem services to different communities and economic sectors, including agriculture, fisheries, and tourism.

In 2007, Myanmar's military dictatorship signed an agreement for the construction of seven hydroelectric dams, yielding a total of 13,360 MW, on the N'mai and Mali Rivers, including the 3600 MW Myitsone Dam at the confluence of both rivers. Environmental organisations have raised concerns about the project's ecological impact on the river's biodiverse ecosystems. Animals potentially impacted include the endangered Irrawaddy dolphin and the critically endangered Ganges shark.

== Names ==
The name "Irrawaddy" is derived from Pali. Irāvatī or Airāvatī (Erāvatī in Pali) is the name of the elephant mount of Sakka and Indra in Hinduism. Saka is an important deva in Buddhism and elephants were often a symbol for water and were used as the name for several other rivers, such as the Achiravati. It can also be based on Iravati, who birthed the mythological elephant. The Irrawaddy gives its name to the Irrawaddy dolphin (Orcaella brevirostris), which is found in the lower reaches of the river and known to help fishers who practice cast-net fishing. Though called the Irrawaddy dolphin, it has been also found in the Bay of Bengal and the Indian Ocean.

During the Age of Discovery, the Irrawaddy was also known to European explorers as the Pegu as the main river of the Hanthawaddy kingdom, itself known as Pegu after its capital, now romanized as Bago. The modern Pegu or Bago River is a separate river, tributary to the Yangon.

After Rudyard Kipling's poem, the river is sometimes referred to as 'The Road to Mandalay'.

== Physiography ==
The Irrawaddy River bisects Myanmar from north to south and empties through the nine-armed Irrawaddy Delta into the Andaman Sea.

=== Sources ===
The Irrawaddy River arises by the confluence of the N'mai (Nam Gio) and Mali Rivers in Kachin State. Both the N'mai and Mali Rivers find their sources in the Himalayan glaciers of Upper Myanmar near 28° N. The eastern branch of the two, the N'mai, is the largest and rises in the Languela Glacier north of Putao. It is unnavigable because of the strong current whereas the smaller western branch, the Mali River, is navigable, despite a few rapids. Therefore, the Mali River is still called by the same name as the main river by locals. The controversial Myitsone Dam is no longer under construction at the convergence of these rivers.

The town of Bhamo, about 240 kilometres (150 mi) south of the Mali and N'mai river confluence, is the northernmost city reachable by boat all year round although during the monsoons most of the river cannot be used by boats. The city of Myitkyina lies 50 kilometres (31 mi) south of the confluence and can be reached during the dry season.

=== Defiles ===
Between Myitkyina and Mandalay, the Irrawaddy flows through three well-marked defiles:

- About 65 kilometres (40 mi) downstream from Myitkyinā is the first defile.
- Below Bhamo the river makes a sharp westward swing, leaving the Bhamo alluvial basin to cut through the limestone rocks of the second defile. This defile is about 90 metres (300 ft) wide at its narrowest and is flanked by vertical cliffs about 60 to 90 metres (200–300 ft) high.
- About 100 kilometres (62 mi) north of Mandalay, at Mogok, the river enters the third defile. Between Katha and Mandalay, the course of the river is remarkably straight, flowing almost due south, except near Kabwet, where a sheet of lava has caused the river to bend sharply westward.

This sheet of lava is the Singu Plateau, a volcanic field from the Holocene. This field consists of magma from the fissure vents and covers an area of about 62 square kilometres (24 sq mi). The plateau is also known as Letha Taung.

Leaving this plateau at Kyaukmyaung, the river follows a broad, open course through the central Dry Zone – the Bamar people's ancient cultural heartland – where large areas consist of alluvial flats. From Mandalay (the former capital of the kingdom of Myanmar), the river makes an abrupt westward turn before curving southwest to unite with the Chindwin River, after which it continues in a southwestern direction. Below its confluence with the Chindwin, the Irrawaddy continues to meander through the petroleum producing city of Yenangyaung, below which it flows generally southward. In its lower course, between Minbu and Pyay, it flows through a narrow valley between forest-covered mountain ranges—the ridge of the Arakan Mountains to the west and that of the Pegu Yoma Mountains to the east.

=== The Irrawaddy Delta ===
The delta of the Irrawaddy begins about 93 kilometres (58 mi) above Hinthada (Henzada) and about 290 kilometres (180 mi) from its curved base, which faces the Andaman Sea. The westernmost distributary of the delta is the Pathein (Bassein) River, while the easternmost stream is the Yangon River, on the left bank of which stands Myanmar's former capital city, Yangon (Rangoon). Because the Yangon River is only a minor channel, the flow of water is insufficient to prevent Yangon Harbour from silting up, and dredging is necessary. The relief of the delta's landscape is low but not flat. The soils consist of fine silt, which is replenished continuously by fertile alluvium carried downstream by the river. As a result of heavy rainfall varying from 2,000 to 3,000 millimetres (79–118 in) a year in the delta, and the motion and sediment load of the river, the delta surface extends into the Andaman Sea at a rate of about 50 metres (160 ft) per year.

=== Hydrography ===
Due to monsoonal rains, which occur between mid-May and mid-October, the volume of the Irrawaddy and its tributaries varies greatly throughout the year. In summer, the melting of the snow and glaciers in Northern Burma add to the volume. The average discharge near the head of the delta is between a high of 32,600 cubic metres (1,150,000 cu ft) and a low of 2,300 cubic metres (81,000 cu ft) per second. The discharge can be as high as 40,393 cubic meter per second in the rainy season. Over a year, the discharge averages 15,112 cubic metres (533,700 cu ft). Further North, at Sagaing, the shows a 38% decrease in discharge compared to where the river enters the delta. it also silted up around 278 tons of sand every year.

Variation between high and low water levels is also great. At Mandalay and Prome, a range of 9.66 to 11.37 metres (31.7–37.3 ft) has been measured between low-water level and flood level respectively. Because of the monsoonal character of the rain, the highest point is recorded in August, the lowest in February.

This variation in water level makes it necessary for ports along the river to have separate landing ports for low- and high-water. Still, low water levels have caused problems for ports along the river, as in the Bamaw–Mandalay–Pyay sectors, the shallowest point is as shallow as 60 centimetres (2.0 ft).

Within the basin, the average population density is 79 people/km^{2}. For these people, the river supply amounts to 18,614 m^{3} per person per year.

=== Sediments to the Sea ===
Collectively, the modern Ayeyarwady (Irrawaddy) and Thanlwin (Salween) rivers deliver >600 Mt/yr of sediment to the sea. Most recent study shows: 1) There is little modern sediment accumulating on the shelf immediately off the Ayeyarwady River mouths. In contrast, a major mud wedge with a distal depocenter, up to 60 m in thickness, has been deposited seaward in the Gulf of Martaban, extending to ~130 m water depth into the Martaban Depression. Further, 2) There is no evidence showing that modern sediment has accumulated or is transported into the Martaban Canyon; 3) There is a mud drape/blanket wrapping around the narrow western Myanmar Shelf in the eastern Bay of Bengal. The thickness of the mud deposit is up to 20 m nearshore and gradually thins to the slope at −300 m water depth, and likely escapes into the deep Andaman Trench; 4) The estimated total amount of Holocene sediments deposited offshore is 1.290 trillion tons. If we assume this has mainly accumulated since the middle Holocene highstand (~6000 yr BP) like other major deltas, the historical annual mean depositional flux on the shelf would be 215 Mt/yr, which is equivalent to ~35% of the modern Ayeyarwady-Thanlwin rivers derived sediments; 5) Unlike other large river systems in Asia, such as the Yangtze and Mekong, this study indicates a bi-directional transport and depositional pattern controlled by the local currents that are influenced by tides, and seasonally varying monsoons winds and waves.

== Ecology ==
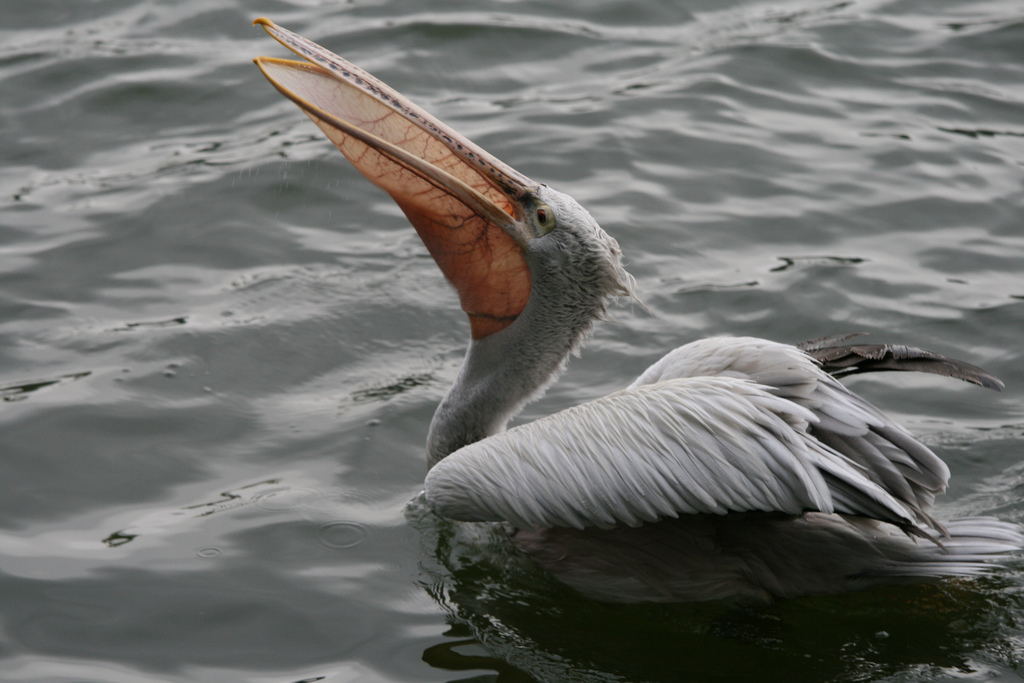
The spot-billed pelican was once widespread in Asia, but is not known to breed in Myanmar anymore.

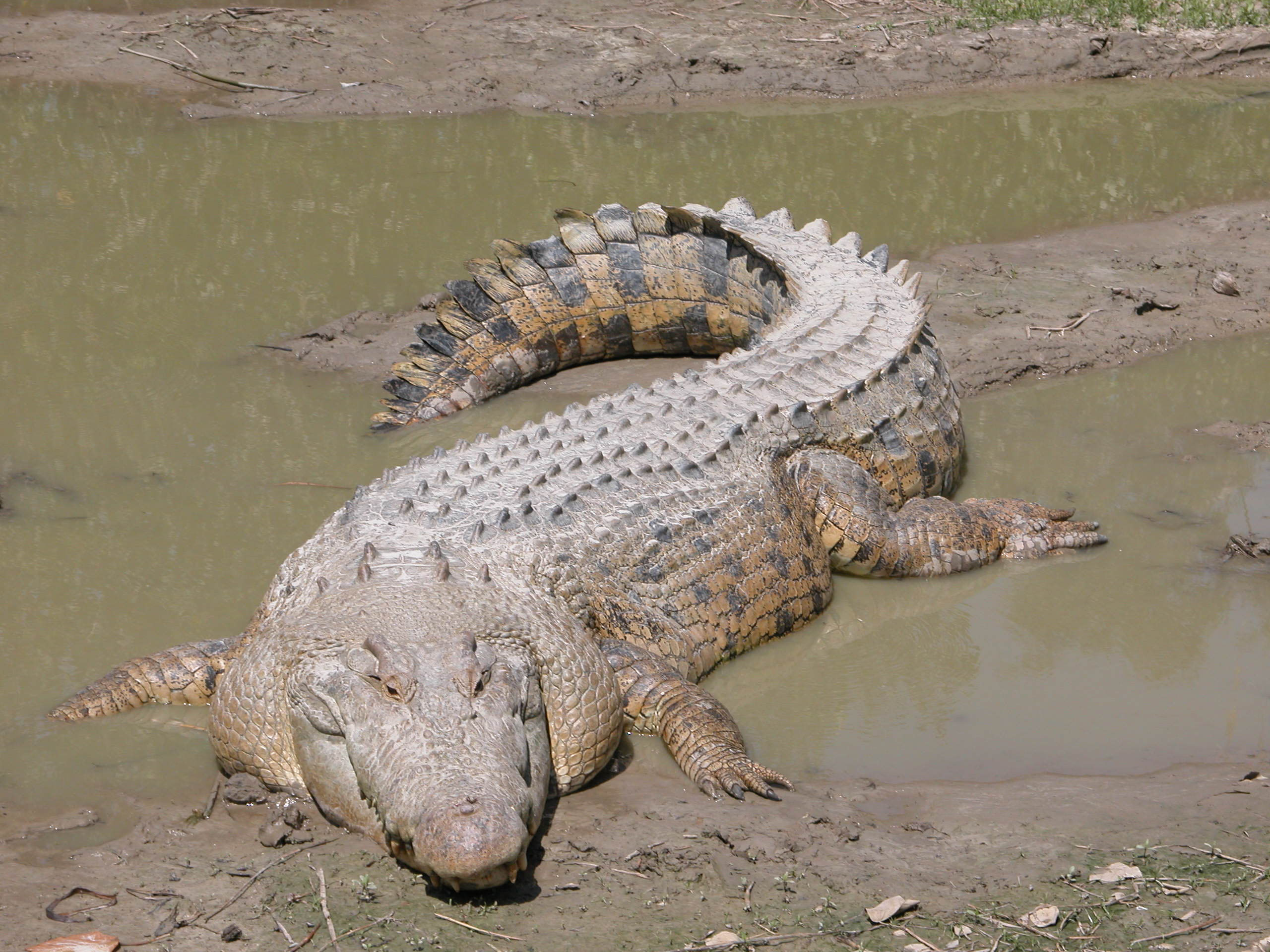
Although the saltwater crocodile is not common in Myanmar, they do live in and near reserved forests. Attacks on people still occur in the Irrawaddy river.

No complete and precise list of all the fish in the Irrawaddy river basin currently exists, but in 1996 it was estimated that there are about 200 species. In 2008, it was estimated that the Irrawaddy ecoregion is home to 119–195 species of fish found nowhere else in the world (endemic). Several new species of fish have been described from the Irrawaddy river basin in recent years (for example, the cyprinid Danio htamanthinus in 2016 and the stone loach Malihkaia aligera in 2017), and it is likely that undescribed species remain.

Among the most well-known species in the river is the Irrawaddy dolphin (Orcaella brevirostris), a euryhaline species of oceanic dolphin with a high and rounded forehead, lacking a beak. It is found in discontinuous subpopulations near sea coasts and in estuaries and rivers in parts of the Bay of Bengal and Southeast Asia.

Along the north–south course of the Irrawaddy River, a number of notably different ecoregions can be distinguished.

=== Alluvial islands ===
The course of the Ayeyarwady River is dotted by short-lived alluvial islands. These temporal ecosystems are highly sought by various animals such as birds, fish, plants, humans and insects who've adapted to live on them. They are highly productive farmland and villages compete to farm new islands when they are created.

=== Northern Mountains ===
The streams of the Nmai and Mali that form the Irrawaddy originate in high and remote mountains near the border with Tibet. This part of Myanmar, which extends north from Myitkyina and the Irrawaddy confluence, lies entirely outside the tropics. Rain falls at all seasons of the year, but mostly in the summer. The valleys and lower hill ranges are covered with tropical and subtropical evergreen rainforest instead of monsoon (deciduous) forest. This region is characterised by subtropical and temperate forests of oak and pine found at elevations above 900 metres (3,000 ft). This evergreen forest passes into subtropical pine forest at about 1,500 metres (4,900 ft) feet. Above 1,800 metres (5,900 ft), are forests of rhododendrons, and that in turn into evergreen conifer forest above 2,400 metres (7,900 ft) feet.

=== The Central Basin and Lowlands ===
The Irrawaddy river basin covers an approximate area of 255 81 km^{2} (31 sq mi). The Central Basin consists of the valley of the middle Irrawaddy and lower Chindwin. It lies within the 'dry zone' and consists almost entirely of plains covered with the teak-dominated Irrawaddy moist deciduous forests ecoregion, which surrounds dry forest patches in drier areas. The central basin receives little rain (ave 650mm per year) although it does flood quickly during the July–October storms. The one meteorological factor which does not vary greatly, and which is the most important for plant life, is atmospheric humidity. This is always high, except in the winter in certain localities. Humidity usually does not fall below 75% and is 90% or more for long periods during the summer. Another feature is the prevalent southerly summer winds which erode the soil of the basin.

The natural habitats of this central zone have been much altered for farming and there are few protected areas.

==== Irrawaddy dry forests ====
The predominant trees of the drier patches are the thorny Terminalia oliveri and the hardwood dahat teak (Tectona hamiltoniana) with stands of Indaing (Dipterocarpus tuberculatus) which is cut for timber. The wildlife includes many birds, small mammals and reptiles such as the huge Burmese python. However, most of the large animals including the tiger have been hunted out or seen their habitats disappear.

Forest cover declined 20% between 1990 and 2010.

=== Irrawaddy Delta Area ===
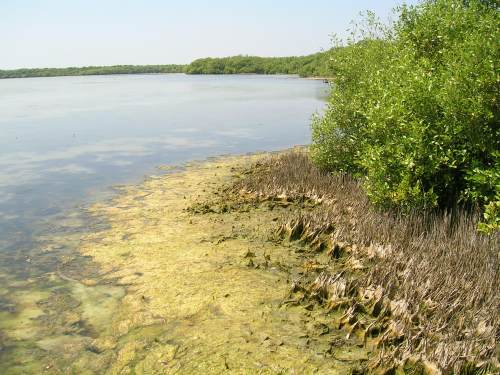
A mangrove forest system along the coast

The Irrawaddy River and its tributaries flow into the Andaman Sea through the Irrawaddy Delta. This ecoregion consists of mangroves and freshwater swamp forests. It is an extremely fertile area because of the river-borne silt deposited in the delta. The upper and central portions of the delta are almost entirely under cultivation, principally for rice. The southern portion of the ecoregion transitions into the Burmese Coast mangroves and is made up of fanlike marshes with oxbow lakes, islands, and meandering streams. Wetlands of the Ayeyarwady are now at a third of their extent when Myanmar achieved independence and 20% of mangroves in the delta were lost between 1995 and 2005.

Birds of the delta are both winter visitors and passage migrants including great cormorant (Phalacrocorax carbo), a wide variety of Anatidae, Eurasian coot (Fulica atra), about thirty species of migratory shorebirds, the whiskered tern (Chlidonias hybrida), the Caspian tern (Hydroprogne caspia), and the brown-headed gull (Larus brunnicephalus), which is very common. One of the most numerous wintering shorebird is the lesser sand plover (Charadrius mongolus), which occurs in flocks of many thousands along the outer coast of the delta. The wood sandpiper (Tringa glareola) and red junglefowl (Gallus gallus) are also abundant.

Several species of large mammal occur in the delta, but their populations are small and scattered, with the possible exceptions of the Malayan sambar deer (Cervus unicolor equinus), Indian hog deer (C. porcinus), and wild boar (Sus scrofa), which have been reported from all Reserved Forests. Asian elephants (Elephas maximus) were once widespread throughout the country with numbers as high as 10,000 animals, but in the last decade numbers have dwindled, partly due to transferring the animals to logging camps. Other species reported to be present include the leopard, Bengal tiger, crab-eating macaque, wild dog, and otters (Panthera pardus, P. tigris, Cuon alpinus, and Lutra species).

The saltwater crocodile (Crocodylus porosus) can be found in the southern part of the delta. The species was formerly abundant in coastal regions, but population numbers have decreased because of a combination of commercial skin hunting, habitat loss, drowning in fishing nets and over-collection of living animals to supply crocodile farms.

It was at this river that a battle between a saltwater crocodile and a tiger was observed that ended with the reptile devouring the tiger.

Despite recent declines in the sea turtle populations, five species are known to nest in Myanmar at well known island and mainland beaches known as turtle-banks. These are the olive ridley sea turtle (Lepidochelys olivacea), the loggerhead sea turtle (Caretta caretta), the green sea turtle (Chelonia mydas), the hawksbill sea turtle (Eretmochelys imbricata), and the leatherback sea turtle (Dermochelys coriacea).

== Tributaries ==
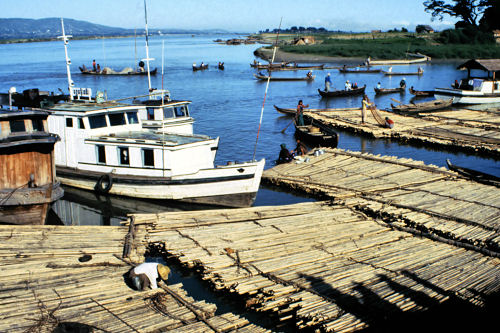
Pulling teak logs, made into large rafts and floated down the Irrawaddy River, ashore near Mandalay.

The Irrawaddy River has five major tributaries. As they flow through the northern tip of Myanmar – the Kachin State – they cut long north–south alluvial plains and relatively narrow upland valleys between the 2,000 to 3,000 metres (7,000–10,000 ft) mountain ridges. The rivers joining the Irrawaddy are, from north to south:

1. Taping River
2. Shweli River
3. Myitnge River
4. Mu River
5. Chindwin River

Towards the mouth, the river also has several distributaries such as the Pathein River, the westernmost distributary serving the inland port city of Pathein.

== Economy ==
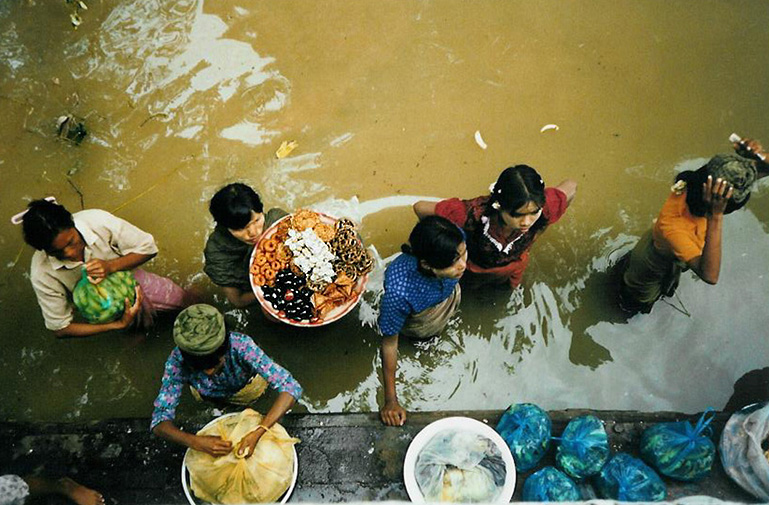
Market activity in the Irrawaddy

Today, the Irrawaddy is still the country's most important commercial waterway. Despite Mandalay's position as the chief rail and highway focus in northern Myanmar, a considerable amount of passenger and goods traffic moves by river. As the Irrawaddy Delta is one of the world's major rice-growing areas, one of the most important goods transported is rice. Teak logs – Myanmar is one of the world's top exporters – are floated down the river as large rafts. Before it is transported, teak has to be seasoned, because otherwise it won't float. This happens by girdling, a practice where a deep circular cut through bark and sapwood is made into the heartwood. Other major goods that are transported from the nation's heartlands to Yangon for export are other foodstuffs, petroleum, cotton, and local commodities.

Commercial transportation on the Irrawaddy is maintained for about 1,300 kilometres (810 mi): from Hinthada to Bhamo (1,080 kilometres (670 mi)) throughout the year, but from Bhamo to Myitkyina (200 km) for only seven months. More than 3,200 kilometres (2,000 mi) of navigable waterways exist in the Irrawaddy delta, and there is a system of connecting canals. The Sittang is usable by smaller boats, but the Salween River, because of its rapids, is navigable for less than 160 kilometres (99 mi) from the sea. Small steamers and country boats also serve the coasts of the Rakhine State and Tanintharyi Region. On the Chindwin River, transportation is carried on by steam or diesel vessels throughout the year up to Homalin—about 640 km from its confluence with the Irrawaddy. Seasonal navigation is carried on into Tamanthi, which is 57 miles (92 km) by river above Homalin.

The Chindwin valley has no railroad and relies heavily on river transport. Chauk, downstream from the confluence in the oil-field district, is a petroleum port. It is linked to Yangon by road and rail. Hinthada, near the apex of the delta, is the rail junction for lines leading to Kyangin and Bassein (Pathein). A ferry operates between Hinthada on the west bank and the railway station at Tharrawaddy on the east bank.

== Culture ==
=== Religion ===
Locals along the Ayeyarwady River view the landscape as peopled by a wide variety of spirits, known as nats in Burmese folk religions. Although Theravada Buddhism provides long-term spiritual fulfillment, people invoke nats to help local communities facing acute situations. Nats are once human individuals that became revered over time, often through festivals and feasts. Nats associated with the Ayeyarwady include:

A-Me-Ye-Yin: She ensures a plentiful bounty is secured in the boat's hull. She's the sister of a local ruler of Pontaung Ponya. A wide variety of food items are given to her as offerings, in accordance with the fisher's wealth.

In-Khaing-Bum: In-Khaing Bum lives a few miles downstream of the confluence of the Mali Kha and N'mai Kha rivers, which forms the Ayeyarwady. He causes dangerous landslides and floods, which led locals to build him a shrine.

Karin Naw and Karin Gam: These two brothers defeated a dangerous serpent spirit that ruined the livelihoods of locals. They used a specific local plant to defeat the serpent and now locals carry around the plant to invoke that protection when travelling the river. A failure to follow these rituals leads to floods and other river-related problems.

Ko Gyi Kyaw: He is protectors of bows for fishing boats. He is considered helpful and benevolent. He drinks and engages in rooster fighting. He used to be a prince who failed to build a canal to divert water to the moat of Pakhan.

Kyun-Pin: A brother and sister who were descendants of a Saopha of Mong Mit were sitting in a riverbath when a teak tree fell on and killed them. The tree carrying their spirits floated downriver to Mingun, where a dreaming meditating monk helped relocate the spirits to the Mong Mit Hills, where a birdhouse shrine was built to house them. Travelers increasingly beseeched Kyun-Pin successfully for aid and their cult spread across the region. They were asked for help dealing with river hazards like debris, sandbanks and rocks. Offerings of coconuts, candles, incense and more are given while various customary rules are followed when near the shrine, such as abstaining from physical affection.

Mahagiri: When a local blacksmith named Maung Tint-te was burned at the stake by Tagaung Mingyee for causing tremors in the city, his sister jumped into the fire alongside him near a saga tree. They became local nats and caused so much mischief that the local ruler uprooted the tree and had it tossed into the Ayeyarwady. Once the tree flowed down the river to Bagan, the king had the tree carved into figures and put in a shrine. Since then, the nat Min Maha Giri vowed to protect the king, his kingdom and its citizens. In turn, they celebrate a festival for him in December and build shrines in their homes. The palace of the last Burmese king maintained a shrine to him.

Ponmagyi: She is prayed to for higher crop yields, pest protection and good weather during plowing and harvest seasons. Offerings of food are given to the deity and spread around to local community members.

Pyin-Daung-Lay Mae Daw: She lives in the Katha District near a flooded lake. She ensures a good fish harvest for people fishing in the lake. When fish harvests decline, her devotees move to better fishing grounds further south, where her worship spreads.

Taung Byone: The brothers are a protector of bows for the boats of fishers. They were princes who were executed by a local king for not contributing a brick to a pagoda. A festival to them is held at the beginning of the monsoon season.

=== Fishing ===
Fishers deal with a large predatory catfish who rip fishing nets. They are viewed as nats and are put back in the water if accidentally caught. Ayeyarwady dolphins are viewed as friendly and help corral fish into fishing nets. Traditionally, fishers follow customary rules to preserve fish stocks, and people who refuse to abide are ostracized. Fishing is prohibited during spawning and breeding season. Smaller fish are typically caught and released. Fishing activities are aligned with the change in the seasons and fishers are specialized in different kinds of sizes of fish and net types.

In 1980s Htigyaing, four pounds of fish could be caught in minutes using a hand fishing net. The region is filled with troughs that fill with floodwaters during the monsoon season or heavy rains. Once the flood subsides, the troughs and their fish become isolated. Bamboo traps stop fish so fishers can catch them and put them in large dug pits. Once the pit is full, a gong is struck and villagers come to distribute the catch.

== History ==
Many geologists believe the Ayeyarwady went to the ocean through what's now the Sittaung watershed rather than its current course to the west. This is linked by some scholars to the Mount Popa-Wuntho volcanic eruptions around 5 million years ago. Fifty thousand years ago, much of the Ayeyarwady watershed was flooded due to high sea levels and formed a gulf including the Sittaung watershed. The gulf likely reformed during a sea level rise around 8000 years ago due to glacial melt. These inundations created the nutrient-dense soils later used by human agriculturalists.

The earliest agriculturalists to live along the river were the Pyu people. They practiced recessional agriculture and settled alongside valleys to avoid severe overflooding of their crops. This form of agriculture was the only one that could compete with the effectiveness of hunting and gathering. Alongside increased agricultural output, it also made fishing more fruitful, as fishers would use bamboo stakes to block the passage of large fish, which trapped them. When water levels fell, it became easy to gather a lot of fish. Pyu people constructed small weirs to divert water flow to desired areas. The Pyu built one of their most significant cities, Pyay, at the end of the Dry Zone and farmed the floodplains there.

The Bamar people continued many of the agricultural practices of the Pyu people. Their agricultural heartland was in the Dry Zone created by the rain shadow of the Arakan Mountains and maintained expansive paddy fields. Silty, nutrient-rich water would seasonally flood agricultural fields, fertilizing them with relatively minimal effort for farmers. The river and its tributaries were also vital for trade, as much of them are navigable. Trade goods needed by lowland farmers typically came down from the highlands and vice versa. Towns along the fall line where the rivers stopped being navigable, became important trade hubs due to their strategic locations. This importance also invited violence and conflict. Oftentimes, buoyant trade products such as wood, jars and bamboo would simply be tied up and drifted downstream for easy transport.

The locals used their strategic position along the Irrawaddy to gain power in the region by leveraging trade and transport links between China and India. By the twelfth century, a well-developed network of canals made flourishing rice cultivation.

During early industrial times, towns along the fall line became important hubs for watermills for making flour and textiles. Up until the colonial era, travel between communities was dominated by travel along the Ayeyarwady River, and during that time the British maintained the largest freshwater fleet on the river. At its peak in 1920, the Irrawaddy Flotilla Company maintained around 600 boats for moving cargo and people. The river became a key economic tool of Imperial British interests, who set up trading ports along its shores.

In the late 19th century, the spot-billed pelican (Pelecanus philippensis) nested in huge numbers in the Irrawaddy River delta. One colony on the Sittaung River plain to the east of the delta was described in November 1877 as covering 300 square kilometres (100 sq mi) and containing millions of birds. Immense colonies still bred in the area in 1910, but the birds had disappeared completely by 1939. Small numbers were regularly reported in the delta in the 1940s, but no breeding sites were located. As of 2010, no pelicans have been recorded, and it may well be that the species is now extinct in Myanmar.

=== Contemporary history ===
==== Decling fish populations ====
Since the 1980s, local fishers along the Ayeyarwady began noticing sharp declines and changes in fish populations. In a relatively short period of time, fish populations have been in sharp decline, with some species being close to local extirpation. What fish are found are increasingly juveniles or smaller in size. Some fishers claim 80% declines in fishing yields since the 1980s, attributing the decline to economic necessity causing changes in the conduct of fishing. They also attribute the decline to sewage and industrial waste being dumped into the rivers from the major cities. Oil spills and wave action from boats are also threats.

In Htigyaing, fish populations were stable and abundant until the late 1980s. Timber harvesting, sand dredging, infrastructure projects and gold mining are leading to local ecosystems and habitats being destroyed. Breeding rates are plummeting, and fish are migrating further upstream to find stable habitats. Local cultural customs are being eroded. For example, local elders tried to organize a proper burial for a dead Irrawaddy dolphin during an infrastructure project but were subverted.

==== Mining ====
Unregulated gold mining during the 2021 Myanmar civil war, mostly in the north of the river basin, has led to high levels of contamination across the river's run with high levels of mercury, cadmium and magnesium in samples taken from Pathein to Kachin State. Environmental and health concerns are highest in the north, where locals have reportedly suffered skin conditions from using contaminated water, and fish are no longer considered safe to consume. Some locals also reported cyanide pollution. Mining threats aren't limited to gold but also includes tungsten, zinc, rare earth metal, rubies, sapphire, jade, antimony, chrome, nickel, sand, natural gas, oil, copper, gravel, silver and lead mining.

==== Dams controversy ====
Myanmar's military junta signed an agreement with China Power Investment Corporation in May 2007 for the construction of seven hydroelectric dams along the Irrawaddy, Mali, and N'Mai rivers in Kachin State. The total planned output of all seven plants will be 15,160 MWs of electricity, making it the largest hydropower project in Myanmar, surpassing the 7100 MW Tasang Dam in Shan State. The following data is available for the dam locations:

Capacity, Height and Length Data for the Dam Projects
Location	Myitsone	Chibwe	Pashe	Lakin	Phizaw	Khaunglanphu	Laiza
Height (m)	152	47.5	–	–	–	–	–
Length (m)	152	220	–	–	–	–	–
Capacity (MW)	3,600	2,800	1,600	1,400	1,500	2,700	1,560

The power generated by the dams will be transmitted to other countries in the South-East Asian region, with most going to China. Other countries targeted for power export are Thailand, India and Bangladesh.

The largest of the seven, the Myitsone Dam, is located at the confluence of the Mali and N'Mai Rivers at the creation of the Irrawaddy. Although the China Power Investment Corporation is project manager of the Confluence Region Hydropower Projects. ParConfluence Region Hydropower Projects, several companies have been or are currently involved in the preparation, construction and financing of the 3,600 MW Myitsone Dam. Asia World Company has a key position, amidst Burmese Suntac Technologies and state-run Myanmar Electrical Power Enterprise, a state-owned utility enterprise responsible for power generation, transmission and distribution

Chinese involvement comes from China Power Investment Corporation, China Southern Power Grid, Yunnan Machinery Equipment Import & Export Company Changjiang Institute of Surveying, Planning, Design and Research. At least one Japanese company is involved, Kansai Electric Power Company.

Due to its location and size, construction of the Myitsone Dam has raised significant ecological and sociological concerns. According to the Irrawaddy Myitsone Dam Multipurpose Water Utilizing Project study, the maximum water level of the reservoir will be 290 metres. This makes for a flood zone of 766 km^{2}, compromising 47 villages.

Other consequences of the inundation include loss of farmland, loss of spawning habitat as fish can not swim upstream anymore. The Kachin Development Networking Group, a network of civil society groups and development organisations in Kachin State warn this will lead to a loss of income for fishermen. They report locals are also worried about the flooding of cultural sites in the flood zone. As with other large dam projects, the Myitsone Dam construction will alter the hydrological characteristics of the river, e.g. preventing sediment from enriching riverbanks downstream, where it usually enriches the riverside food-producing plains. This can affect fertility as far downstream as the Irrawaddy Delta, the major rice-producing area of Myanmar.

Ecological concerns focus on the inundation of an area that is the border of the Indo-Burma and South Central China biodiversity hotspots. The Mali and N'mai River confluence region falls within the Mizoram-Manipur-Kachin rainforests, added to the WWF list of outstanding examples of biodiverse regions.

The location of the Myitsone Dam, located less than 100 km from a fault line where the Eurasian and Indian tectonic plates meet, raised concerns about its earthquake resistance. Earthquakes in the region, such as the 5.3 magnitude earthquake that struck near the Myanmar-China border on 20 August 2008, prompted Naw Lar, the coordinator of the KDNG dam research project, to ask the junta to reconsider its dam projects.

== Major cities and towns ==
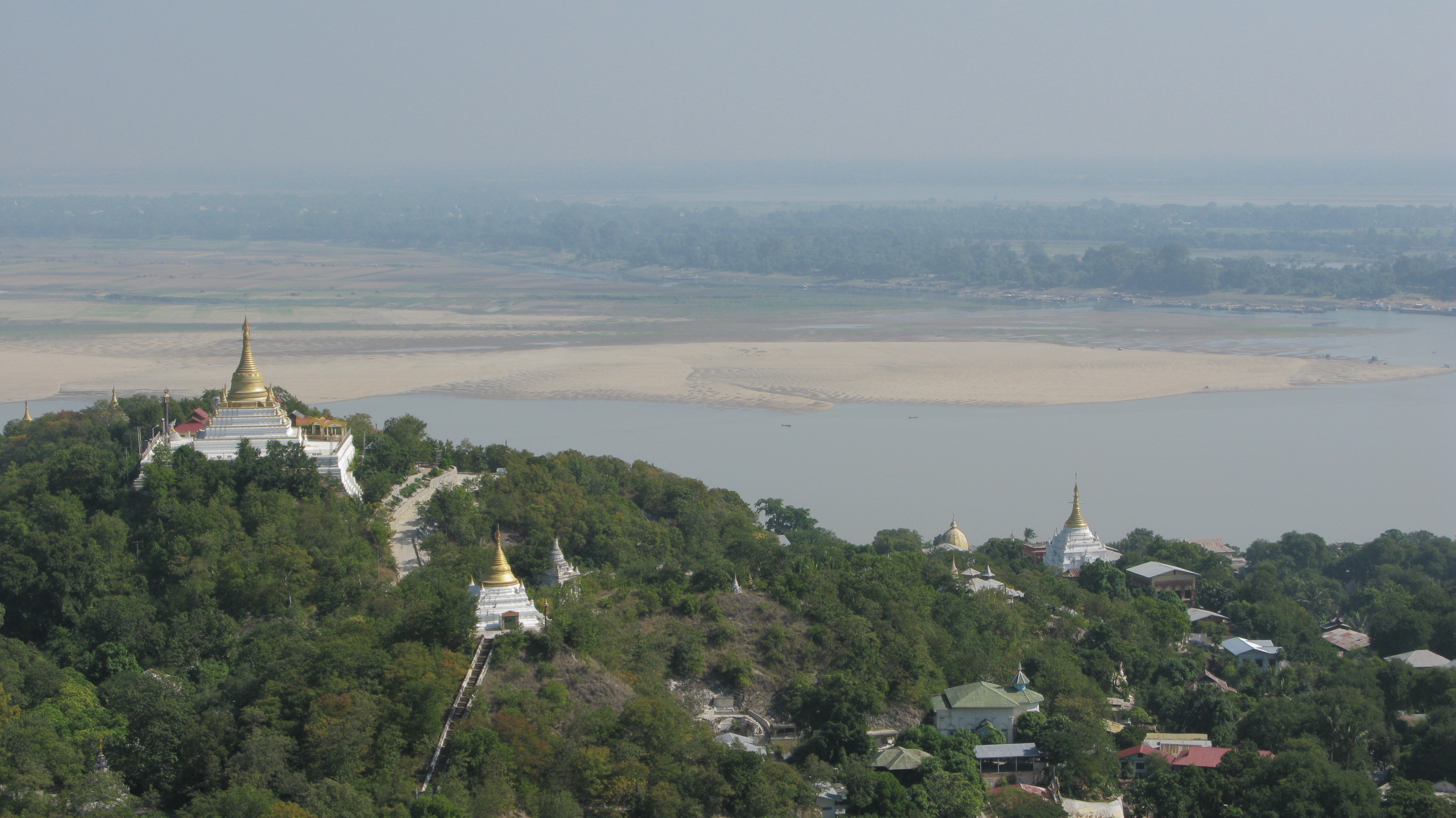
Irrawaddy River from Sagaing Hill, Sagaing

The river flows through or past the following cities:

- Myitkyina
- Bhamo
- Katha
- Tagaung
- Kyaukmyaung
- Mandalay
- Sagaing
- Yenangyaung
- Chauk
- Bagan
- Nyaung-U
- Pyay
- Hinthada
- Pantanaw

== Bridges ==
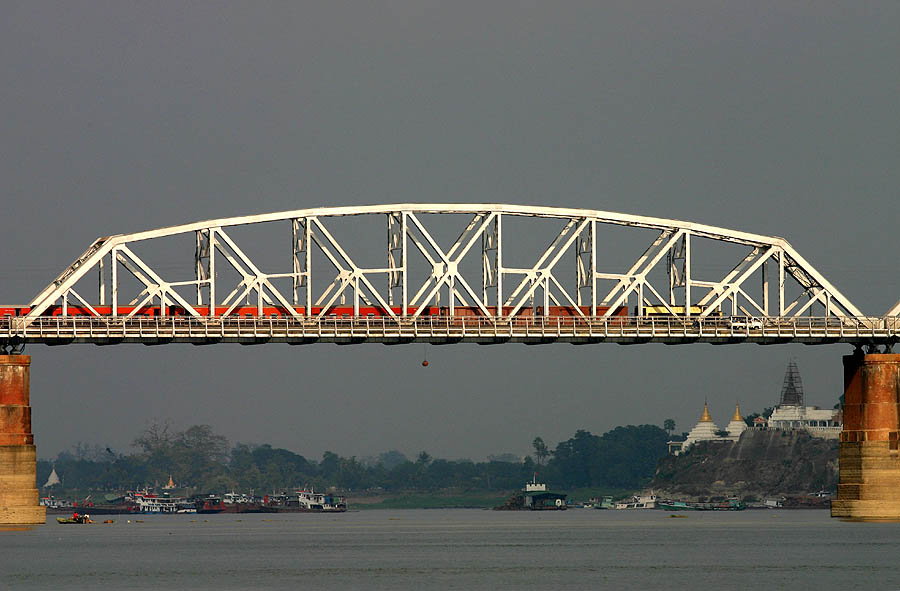
The Ava Bridge near Sagaing, rebuilt in 1954 after the wartime destruction of the original bridge built in 1934, was the only bridge over the Irrawaddy until 1998. The bridge collapsed during the 2025 earthquake.

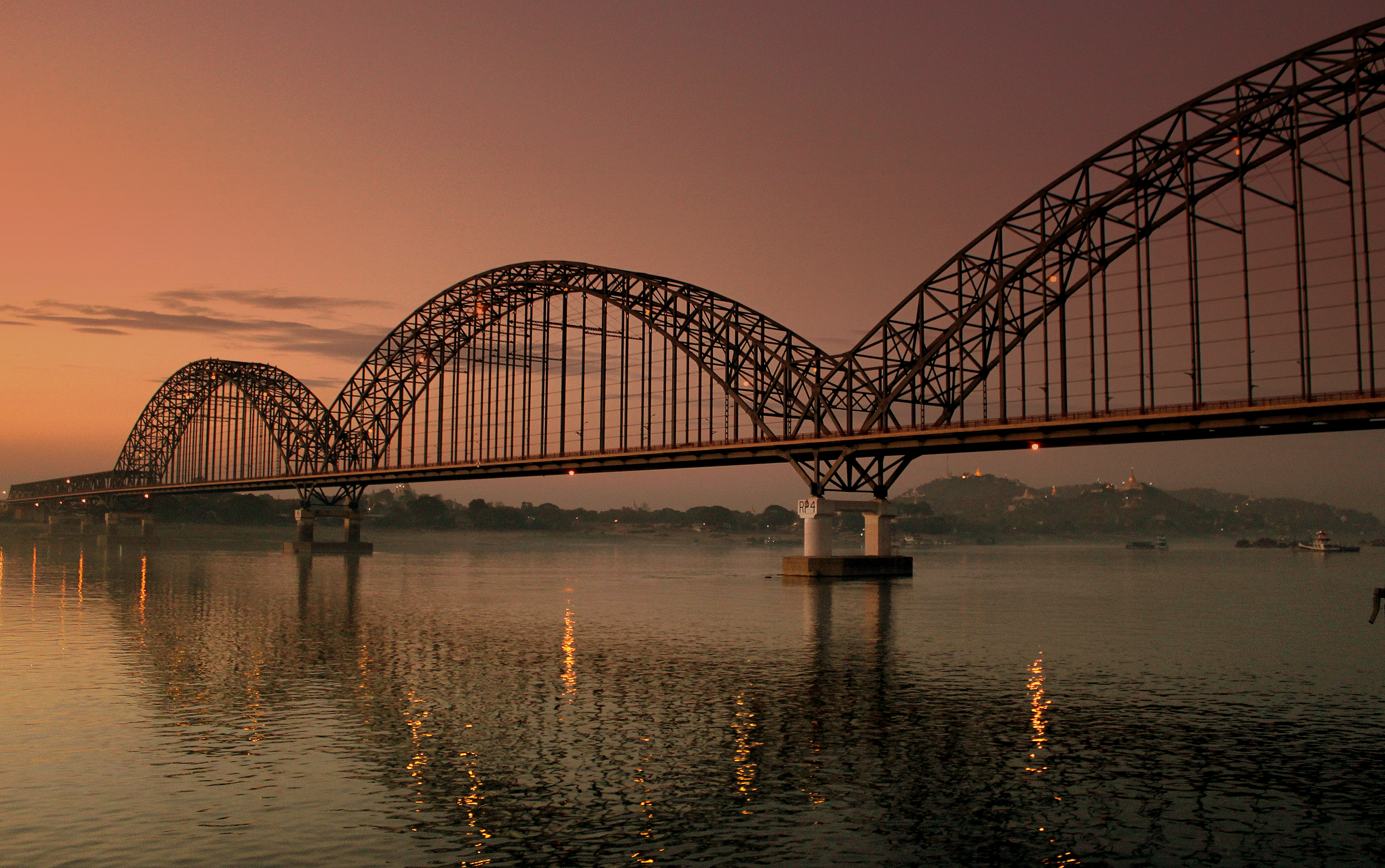
The Irrawaddy Bridge (Yadanabon)

Until the construction of the Ava (Innwa) Bridge, a 16 span rail and road cantilever bridge built by the British colonial government in 1934, the only way across the Irrawaddy was by ferry. The bridge was destroyed by the retreating British Army during World War II and was rebuilt in 1954 after Burmese independence and was the only bridge to span the Irrawaddy until recent times when a spate of bridge construction has been carried out by the government.

1. Bala Min Htin Bridge over the N'Mai Hka at Myitkyina, November 1998
2. Ayeyarwady Bridge (Yadanabon) (Yadanar Pone Bridge/New Ava Bridge) at Mandalay, April 2008
3. Pakokku Bridge between Pakokku and Naung-U, December 2011
4. Anawrahta Bridge at Chauk, March 2001
5. Minbu Bridge at Magway
6. Nawaday Bridge at Pyay, September 1997
7. Ayeyarwady-Nyaungdon Bridge at Nyaungdon, November 2011
8. Bo Myat Tun Bridge at Nyaungdon, November 1999
9. Maubin Bridge at Maubin, February 1998
10. Ayeyarwady-Dedaye Bridge at Dedaye, March 2003

== Gallery ==
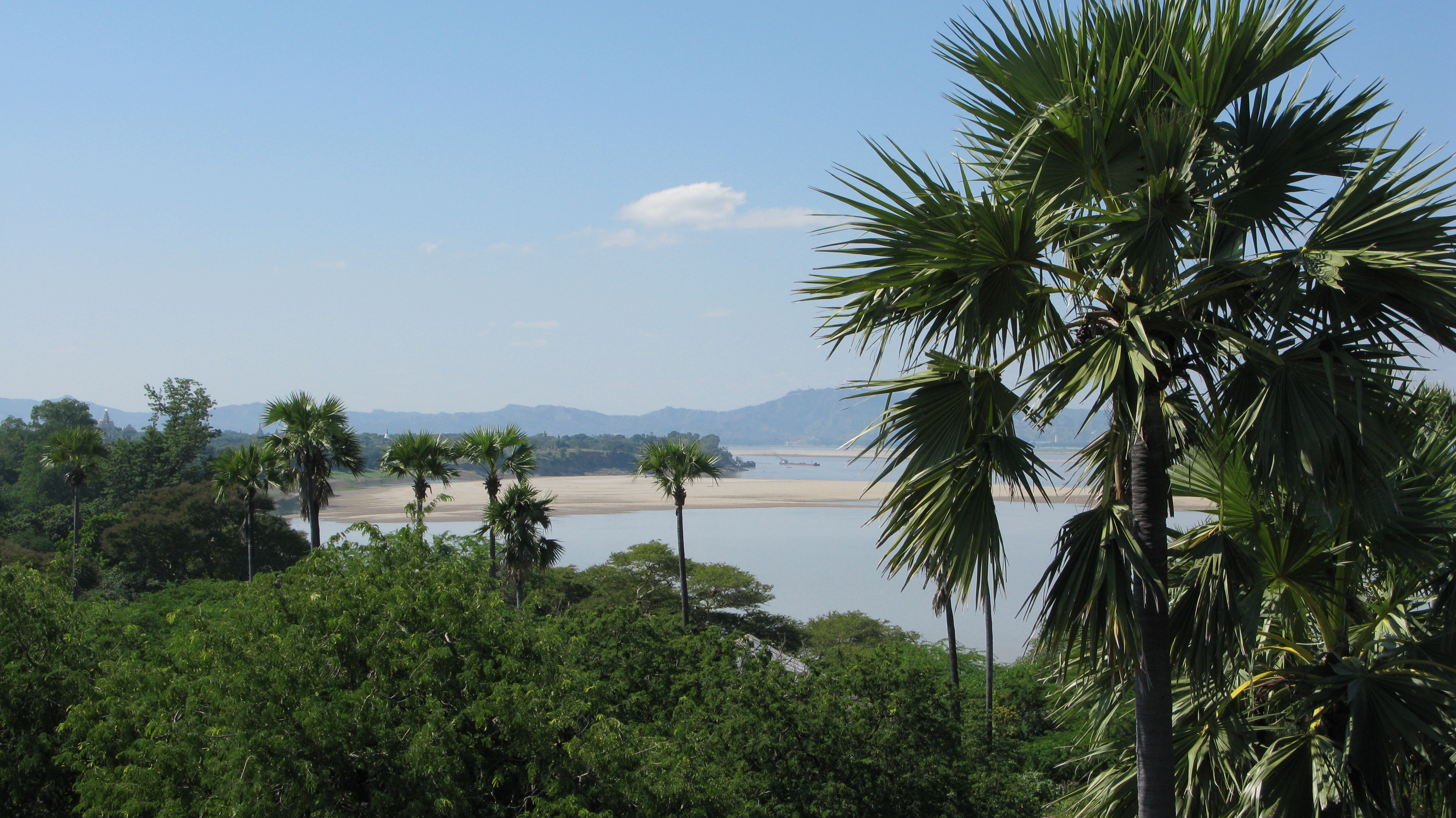
The shores of Irrawaddy River near Nyaung-U, Bagan

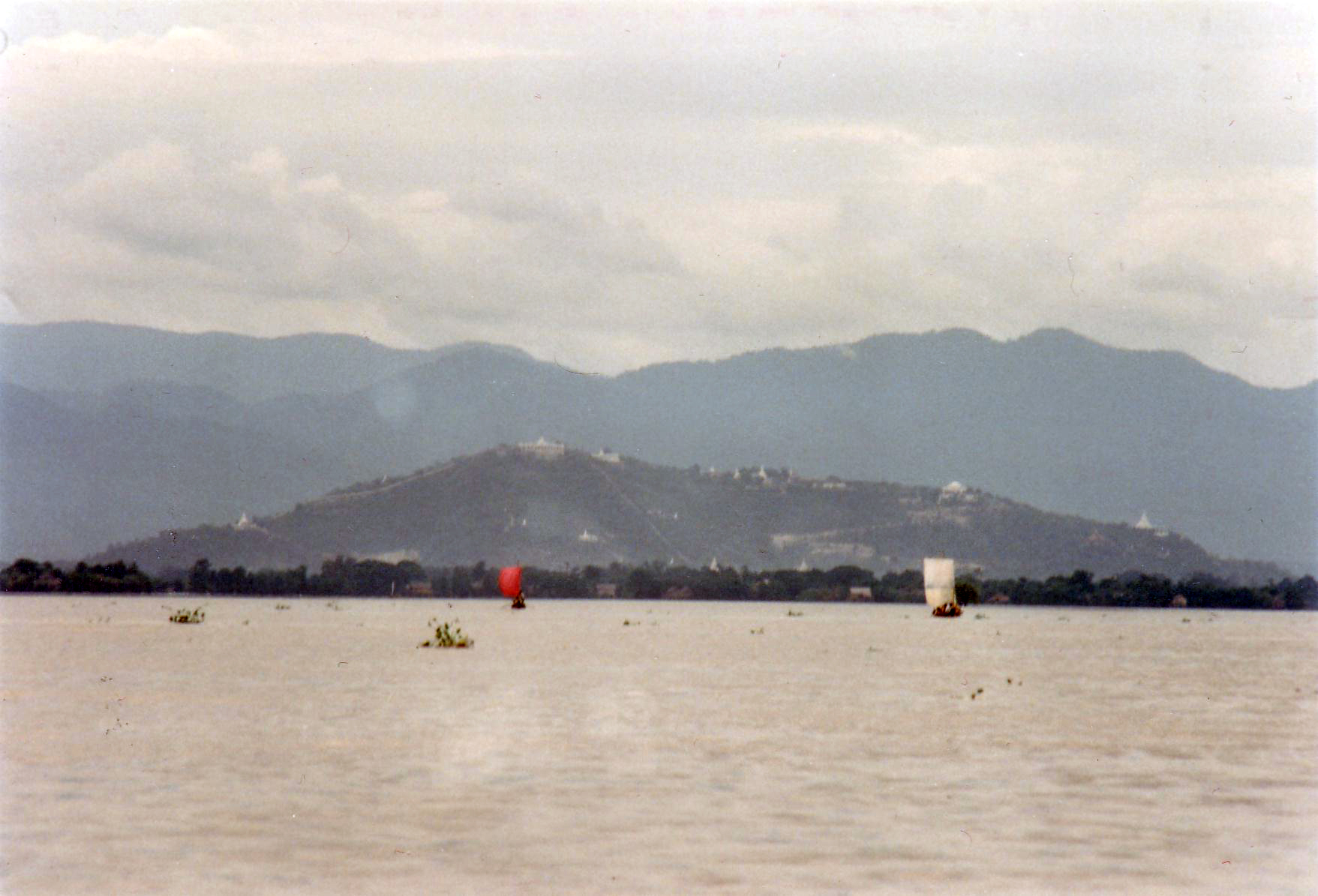
River Irrawaddy with Mandalay Hill on the east bank

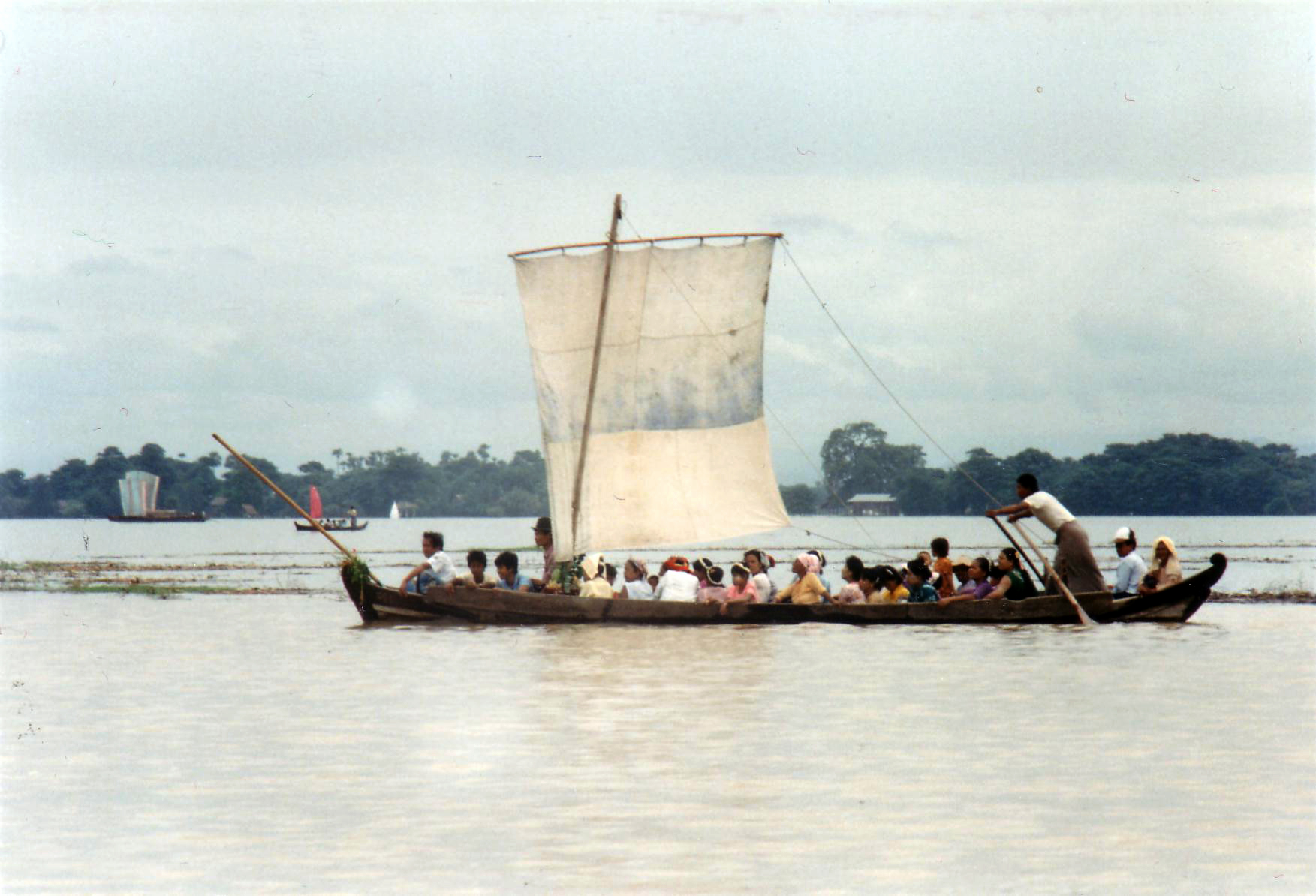
Travelling on the great river

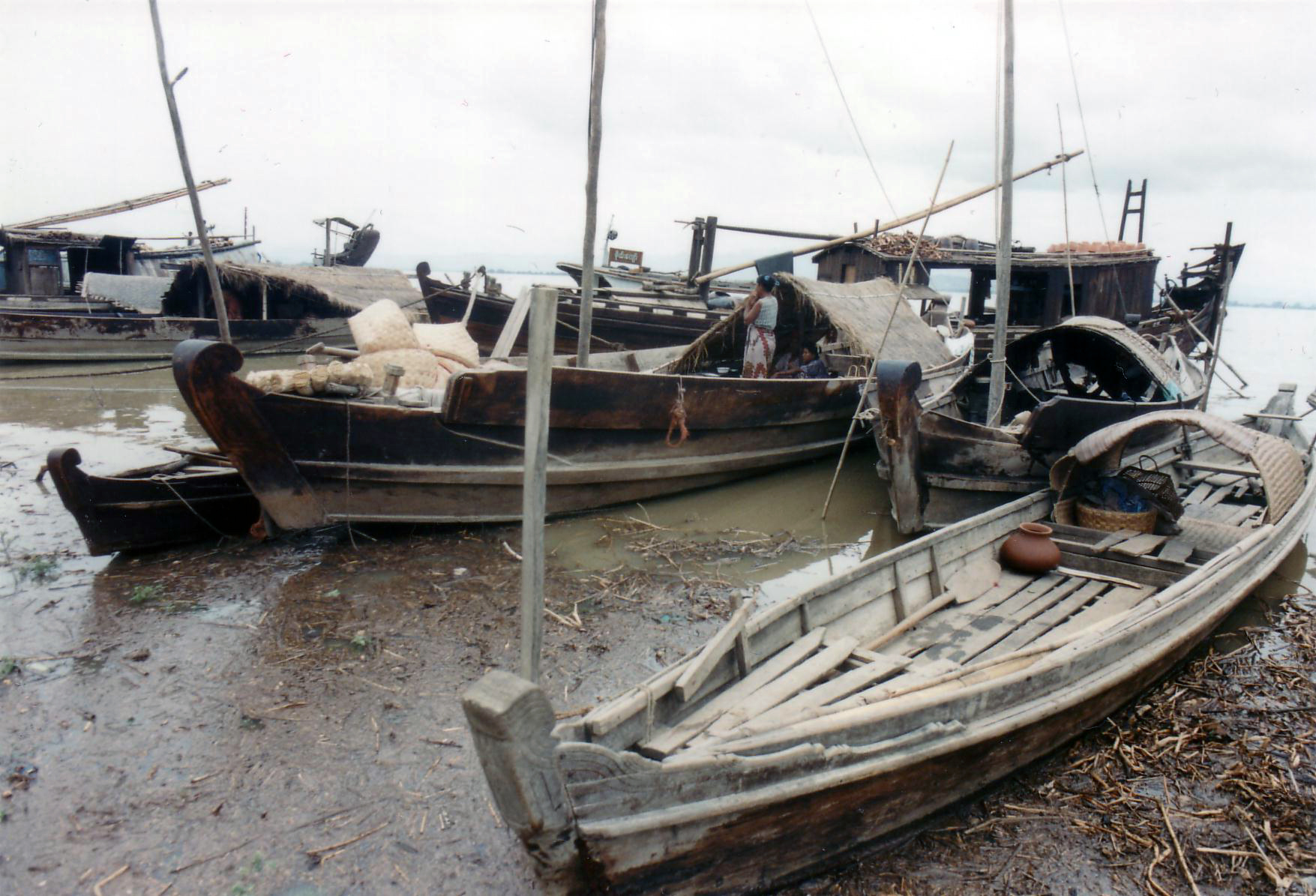
Traditional rivercraft on the Irrawaddy

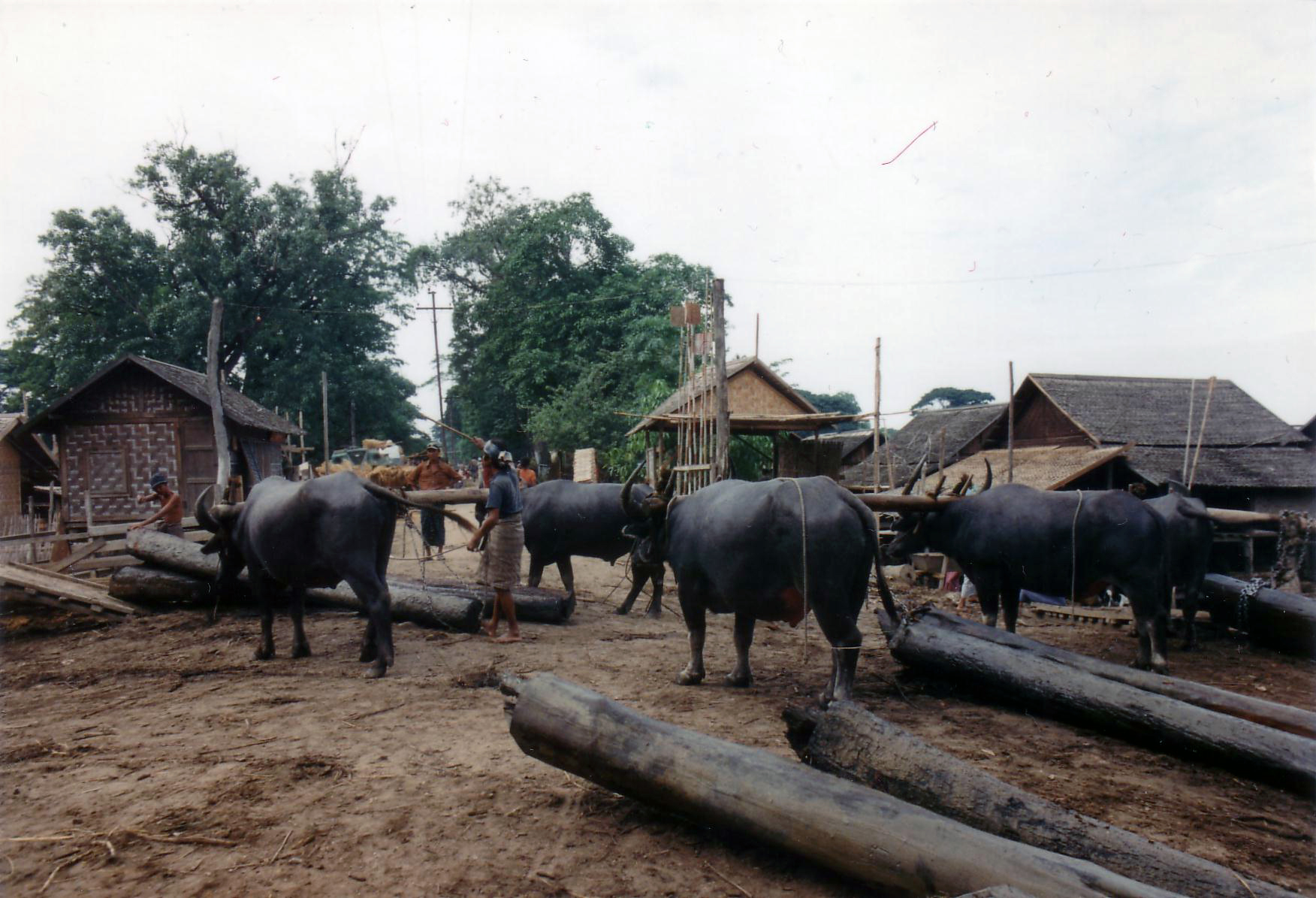
Buffalo pulling logs from the Irrawaddy at Mandalay

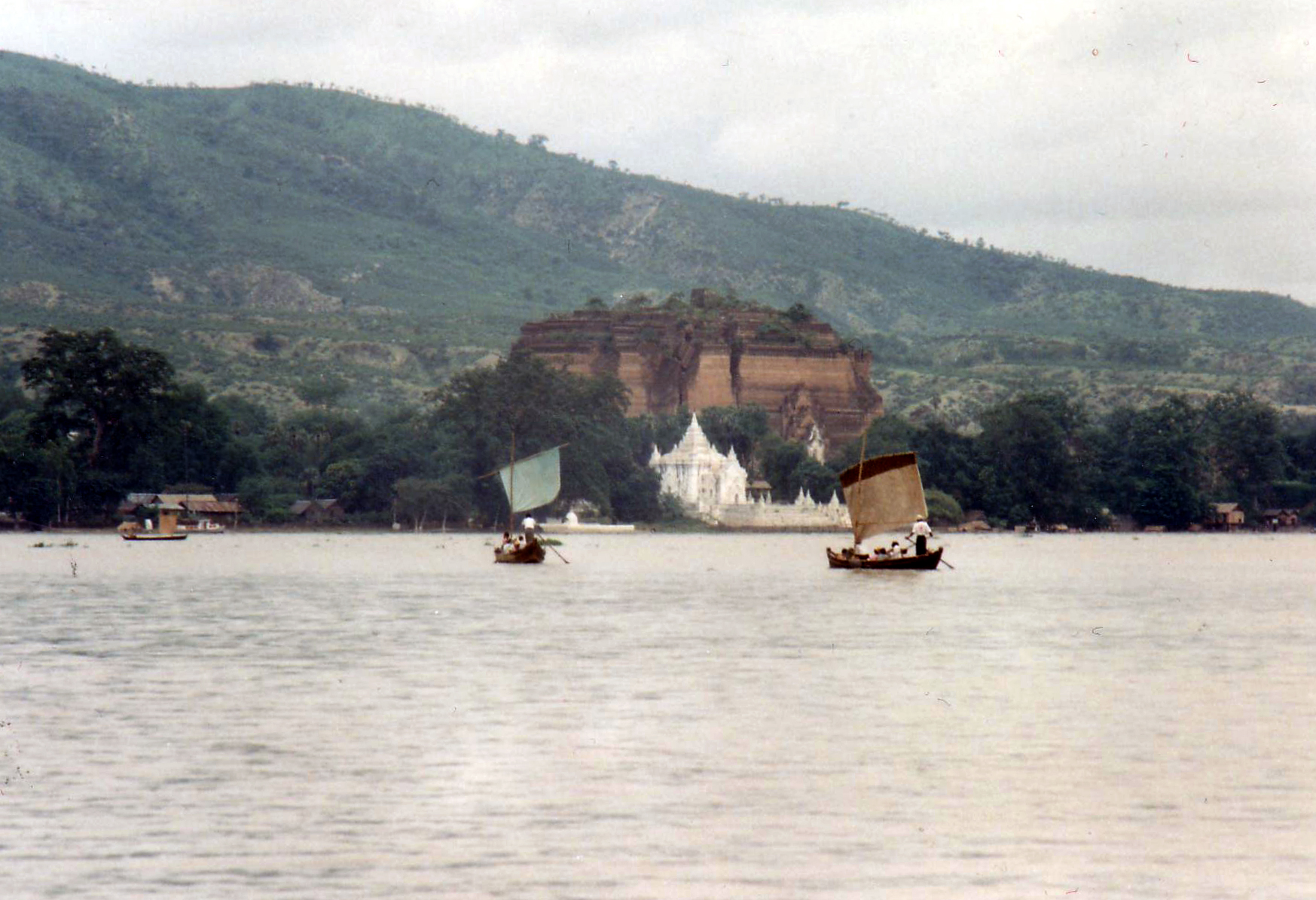
The great river at Mingun

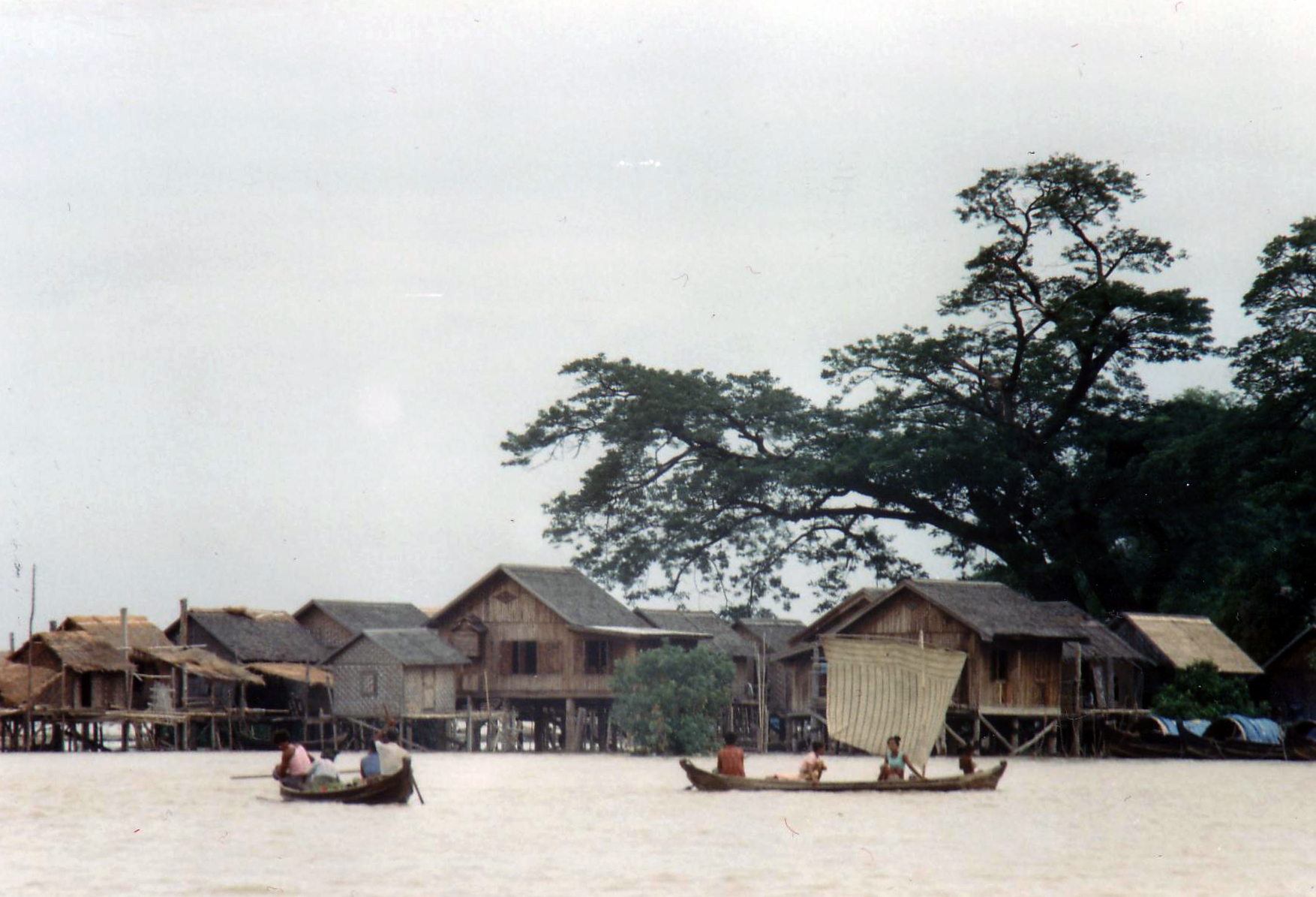
An island village on the Irrawaddy stays above water on stilts during the monsoons

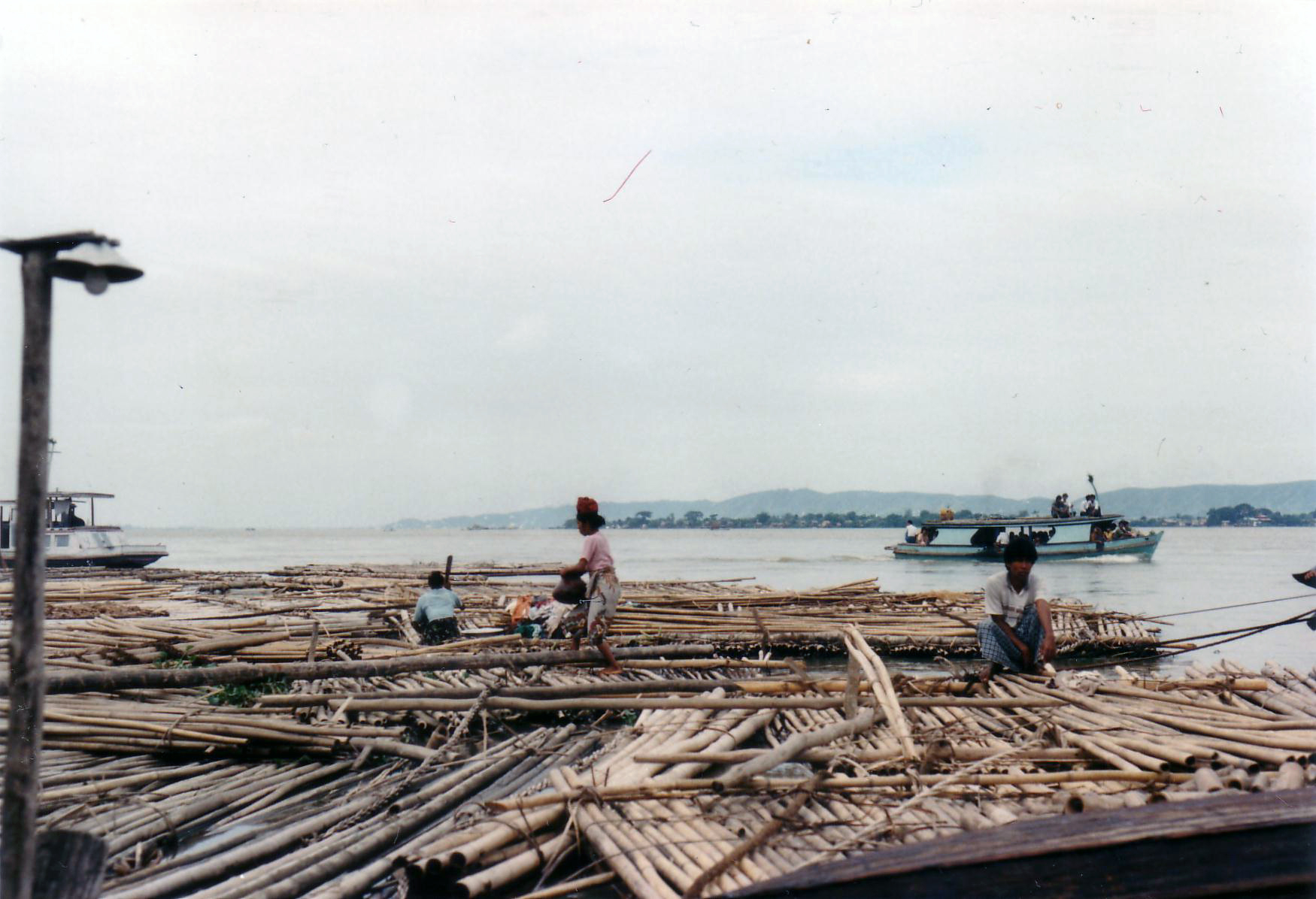
Bamboo rafts by the Irrawaddy

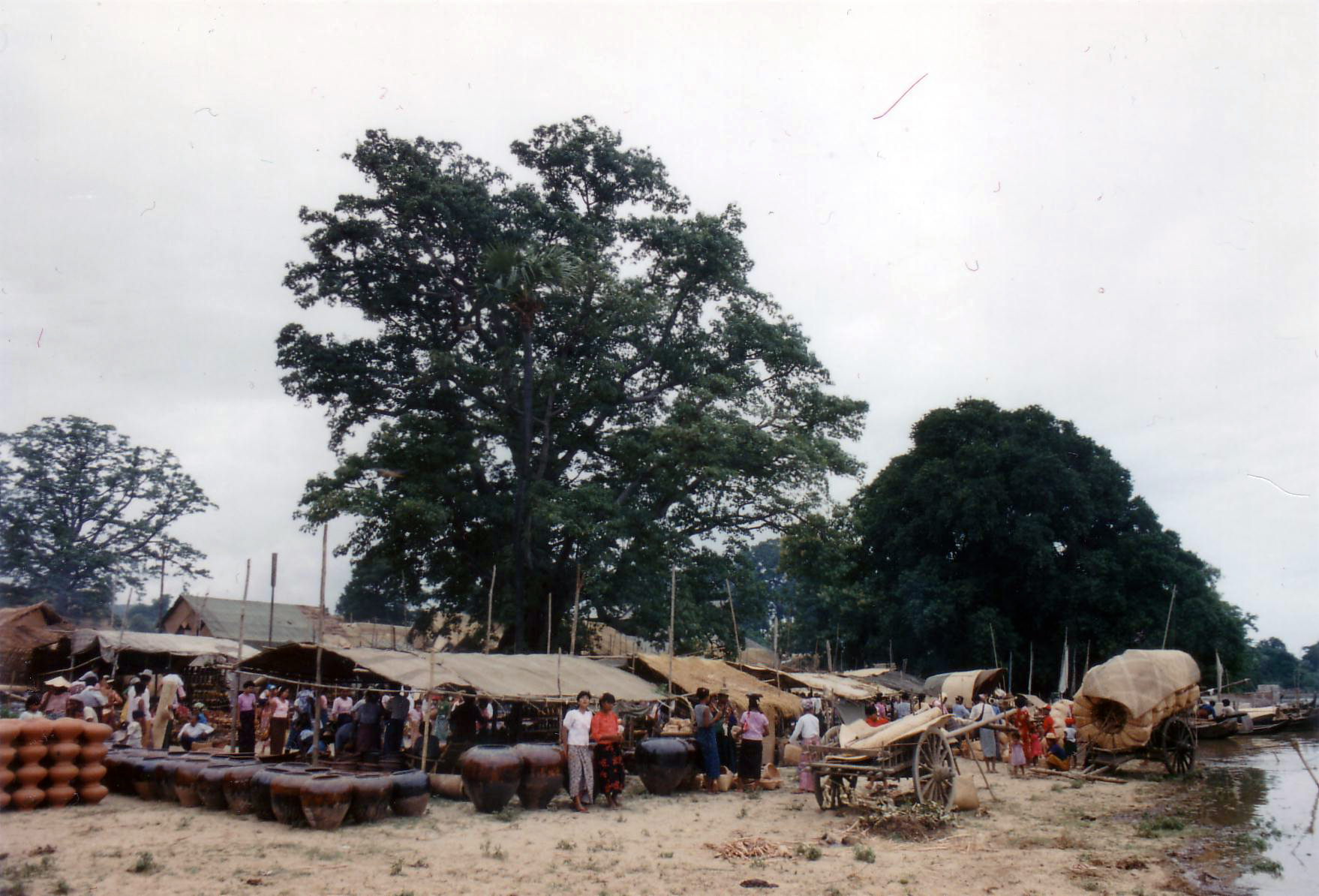
Market on the west bank at Mingun

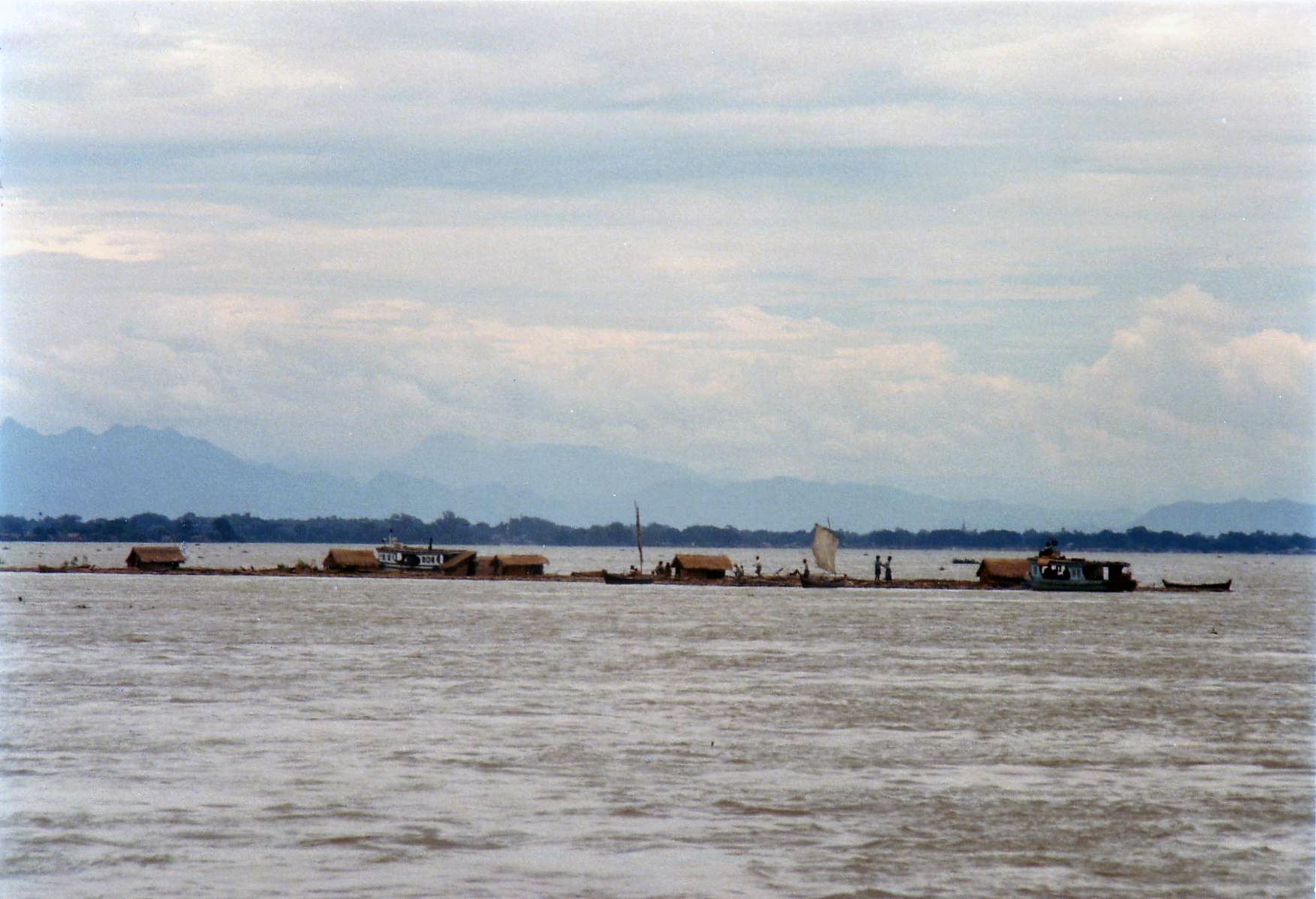
Bamboo raft sailing down the Irrawaddy

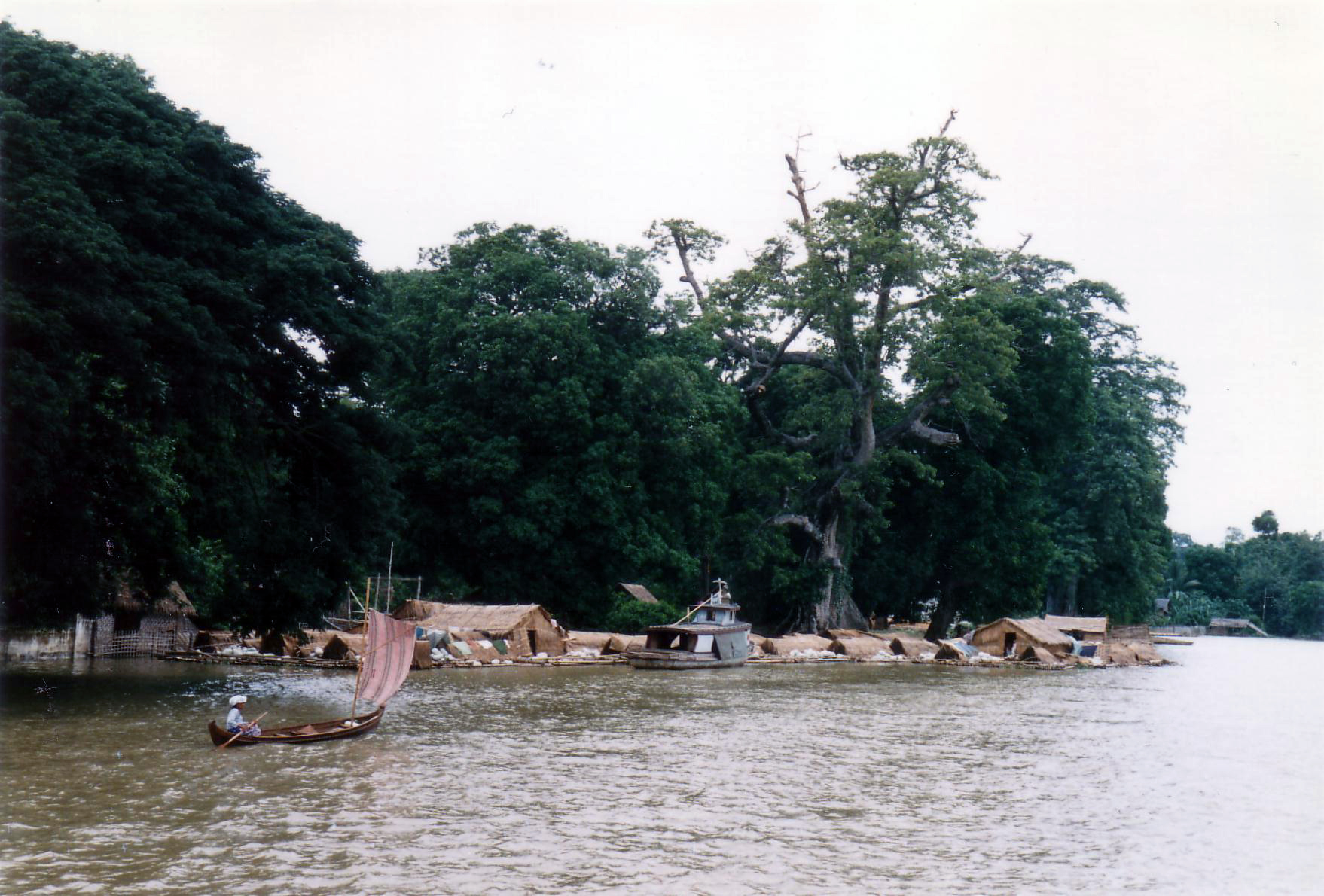
Woman sailing in small boat along the west bank at Mingun

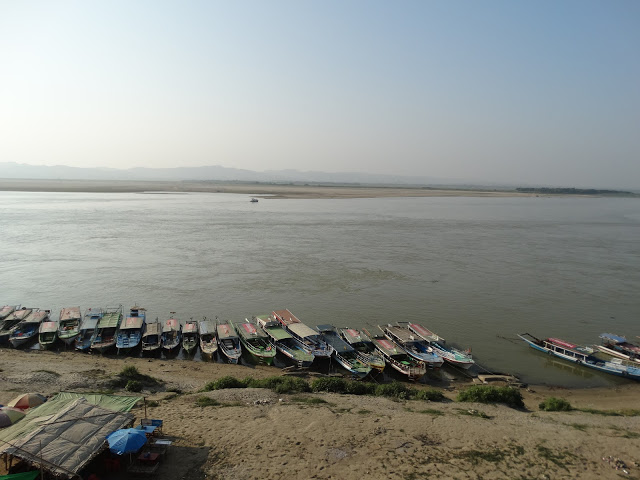
Irrawaddy river near Bu Paya

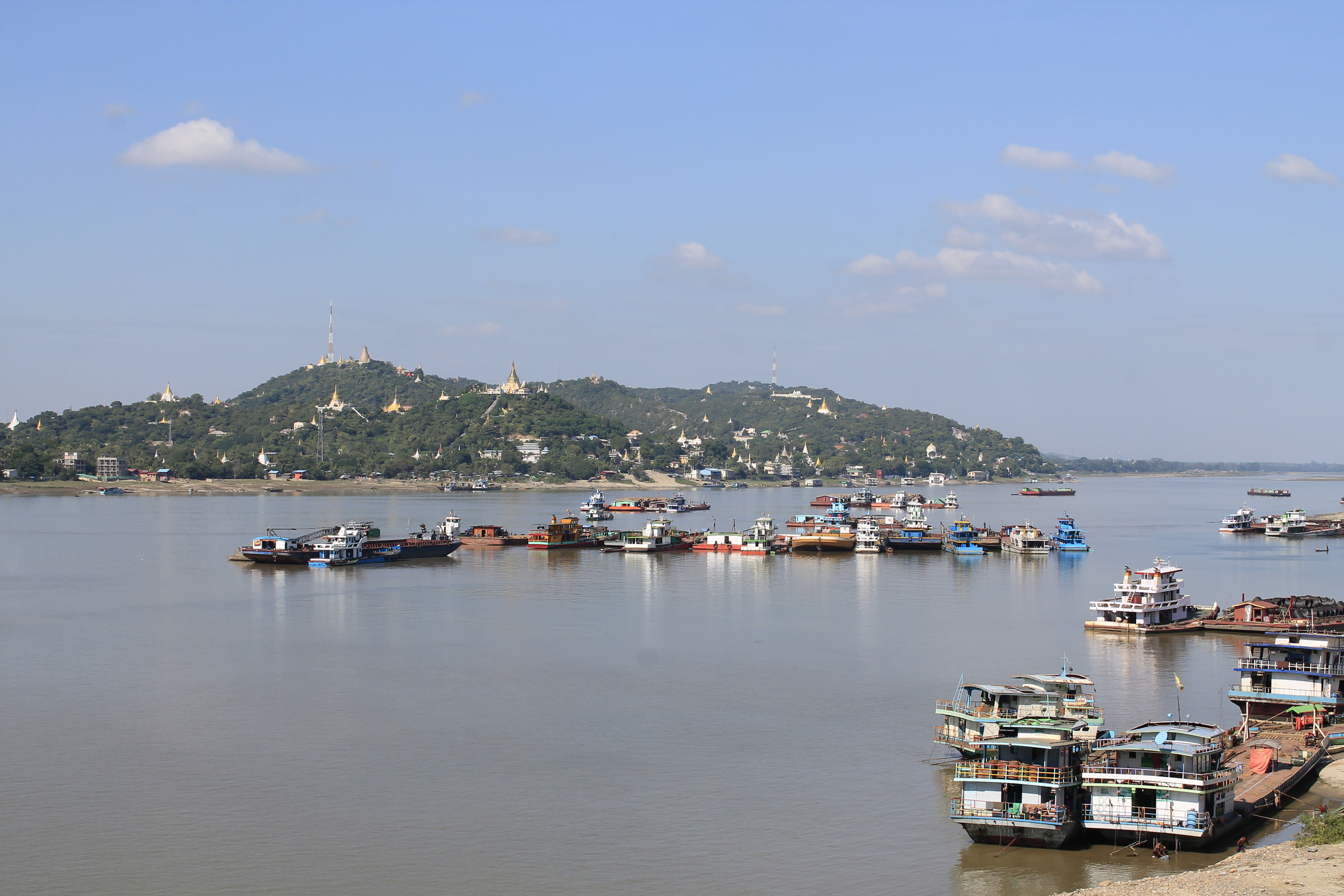
The Irrawaddy as seen from the Yadanabon Bridge looking towards Sagaing

== See also ==
- Irrawaddy Flotilla Company
- Ravi River

== Sources ==
- Scott, James C. (2025). In Praise of Floods: The Untamed River and the Life It Brings. Yale Agrarian Studies. Yale University Press. ISBN 978-0-300-27849-1.
