= Tamai bent-toed gecko =

Scientific classification
- Kingdom: Animalia
- Phylum: Chordata
- Class: Reptilia
- Order: Squamata
- Suborder: Gekkota
- Family: Gekkonidae
- Genus: Cyrtodactylus
- Species: C. tamaiensis

Binomial name
- Cyrtodactylus tamaiensis (M.A. Smith, 1940)

Synonyms
- Gymnodactylus khasiensis tamaiensis M.A. Smith, 1940; Cyrtodactylus khasiensis tamaiensis — Kluge, 2001; Cyrtodactylus tamaiensis — Mahony, 2009

Species of lizard

The Tamai bent-toed gecko (Cyrtodactylus tamaiensis) is a species of lizard in the family Gekkonidae. The species is endemic to Myanmar.

== Geographic range ==
C. tamaiensis is known only from the Nam Tamai Valley in northern Myanmar.

== Description ==
The holotype of C. tamaiensis has a snout-to-vent length (SVL) of 9 cm (3.5 in). It has a dorsal color pattern of dense pale and dark brown marbling.
