= Irrawaddy Bridge =

Irrawaddy Bridge (Yadanabon) ဧရာဝတီတံတား (ရတနာပုံ) Ayeyarwady Bridge Yadanabon Bridge
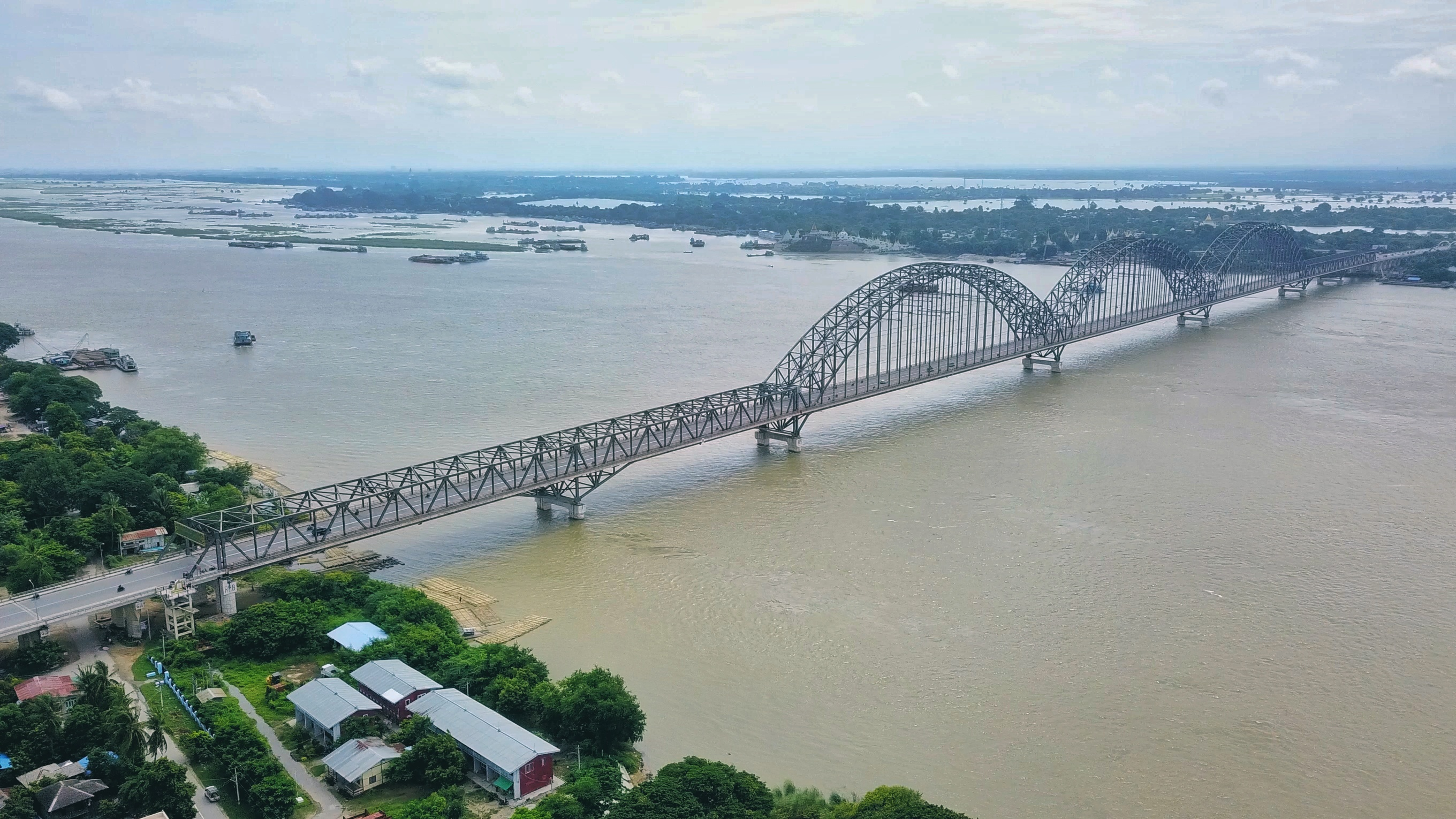
- Yadanabon Bridge
- Coordinates: 21°52′39″N 95°59′42″E
- Carries: Four-lane motorway with two pedestrian lanes
- Crosses: Irrawaddy River
- Locale: Mandalay Division, Burma
- Official name: Irrawaddy Bridge (Yadanabon)
- Other name: Yadanabon Bridge
- Maintained by: Public Works Department

Characteristics
- Design: Through arch (central spans); Through Warren truss (outer spans)
- Total length: 5,614 feet (1,711 m)
- Width: 49 feet (15 m) two pedestrian lanes of 6 feet (2 m) each
- Longest span: 735 feet (224 m)(x3)

History
- Opened: 11 April 2008

Statistics
- Daily traffic: 2,700

The Irrawaddy Bridge (Yadanabon) (Burmese: ဧရာဝတီတံတား (ရတနာပုံ)) (also Ayeyarwady Bridge, Yadanabon Bridge, Yadanar Pone Bridge or New Ava Bridge) is a bridge in Mandalay, Myanmar. It crosses the Irrawaddy River, to the southwest of Mandalay and Amarapura and just to the north of the old Ava Bridge, and is also known as the New Ava Bridge. It was completed in 2008.

== Location ==
The Yadanabon Bridge spans the Irrawaddy River (Ayeyarwady River) in the Mandalay suburb connects with Sagaing City. It is 2,000 feet (610 m) upstream of the Ava Bridge. which is at the confluence of the Irrawaddy with the Myitnge River, close to the Kyaukse rice fields. The bridge (also known as Ayeyawady Bridge) is the gateway to Yangon, Mandalay and interior other regions. Nearby on the river banks are two 12th century payas known as Shwe-kyet-yet and Shwe-kyet-kya.

== History ==
The old Ava (or Inva or Inwa Bridge) across the Irrawaddy River had a span of 3,948 feet (1,203 m). Built by the British in 1934, until the 1990s, it was the only bridge which spanned this river. The Ava had aged, and its carrying capacity became limited to under 15-ton capacity trucks since 1992. Heavily laden vehicles crossed the river with Z-craft ferries, resulting in less efficient transportation of goods.

To ease the traffic congestion and to help improve the overall economic conditions of Burma, a new bridge was planned by the government. International tender was invited in early 2002 for ts construction. The tender for the highway bridge envisaged planning, design and construction. The bidding process lasted eight months, and the work was awarded to China CAMC Engineering Cc., Ltd. in October 2002. The contract was signed in Rangoon for a tendered amount of US$10.90 million on 19 November 2002. (By 2004, 35 bridges were under construction in Burma, along with the Irrawaddy of Yadanabon.) The new bridge was opened on 11 April 2008.

== Features ==
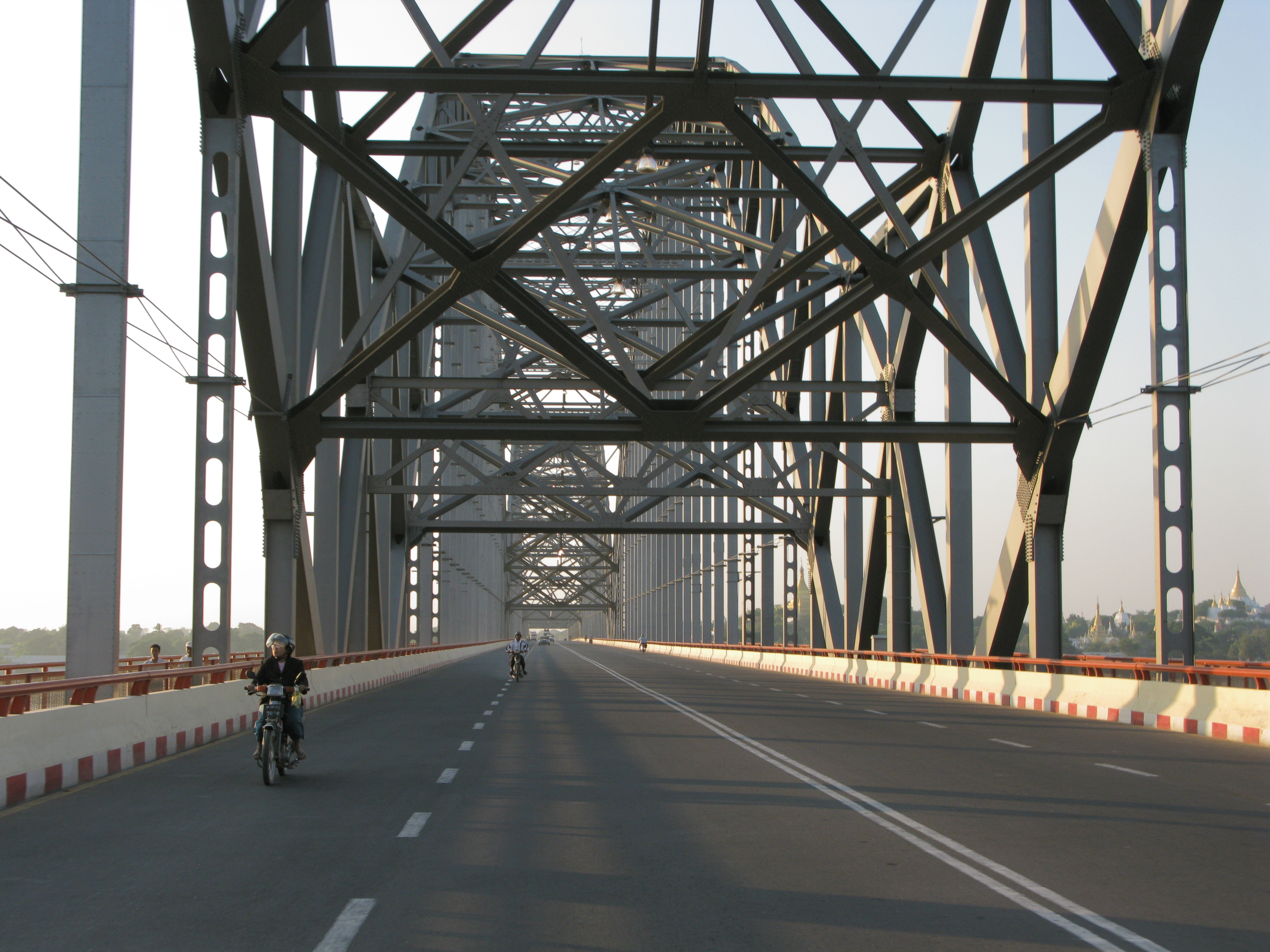
Yadanabon Bridge

Irrawaddy Bridge was built by the Public Works of the Ministry of Construction. It has total span of 5,614 feet (1,711 m) long and has a four-lane motorway of 49 feet (15 m) width with pedestrian lanes of 6 feet (1.8 m) wide on the flanks. It is designed for a carrying capacity of 60 tons. The bridge is a flexible beam structure with three rigid arches of 224 meters each. The main bridge is 3,694 feet (1,126 m) long. Its approach on the Mandalay side is 1,140 feet (350 m) long and that on the Sagaing side is 7780 feet (240 m).

The Thiri Mangala overpass above the railway crossing (which used to hold up traffic) involved a reinforced concrete bridge of 485 feet (148 m) length with a two-lane motorway with a carrying capacity of 60 tons. It is designed to provide a clearance of 52 feet (16 m) width and 17 feet (5.2 m) height to pass the trains.
