= Inwa (disambiguation) =

Inwa (also spelled Innwa; formerly Ava) is a former national capital of Burma (Myanmar).

Inwa may also mean:

- Ava Bridge: A bridge linking Inwa and Sagaing
- INWA: Nordic walking
