= Malihkaia =

Scientific classification
- Kingdom: Animalia
- Phylum: Chordata
- Class: Actinopterygii
- Division: Teleostei
- Order: Cypriniformes
- Family: Nemacheilidae
- Genus: Malihkaia; Kottelat, 2017
- Species: M. aligera

Binomial name
- Malihkaia aligera Kottelat, 2017

Genus of freshwater ray-finned fish

Malihkaia is a monospecific genus of freshwater ray-finned fish belonging to the family Nemacheilidae, the stone loaches. The only species in the genus is Malihkaia aligera. This species was first formally described in 2017 by the Swiss ichthyologist Maurice Kottelat with its type locality given as the Mali Hka River, about 9 km upstream of Kang Mu Lon on the Kachin State of Myanmar at 27°25'54"N, 97°27'56"E from an elevation of 402 m (1,319 ft).
