= Mali River =

Mali River Mali Hka
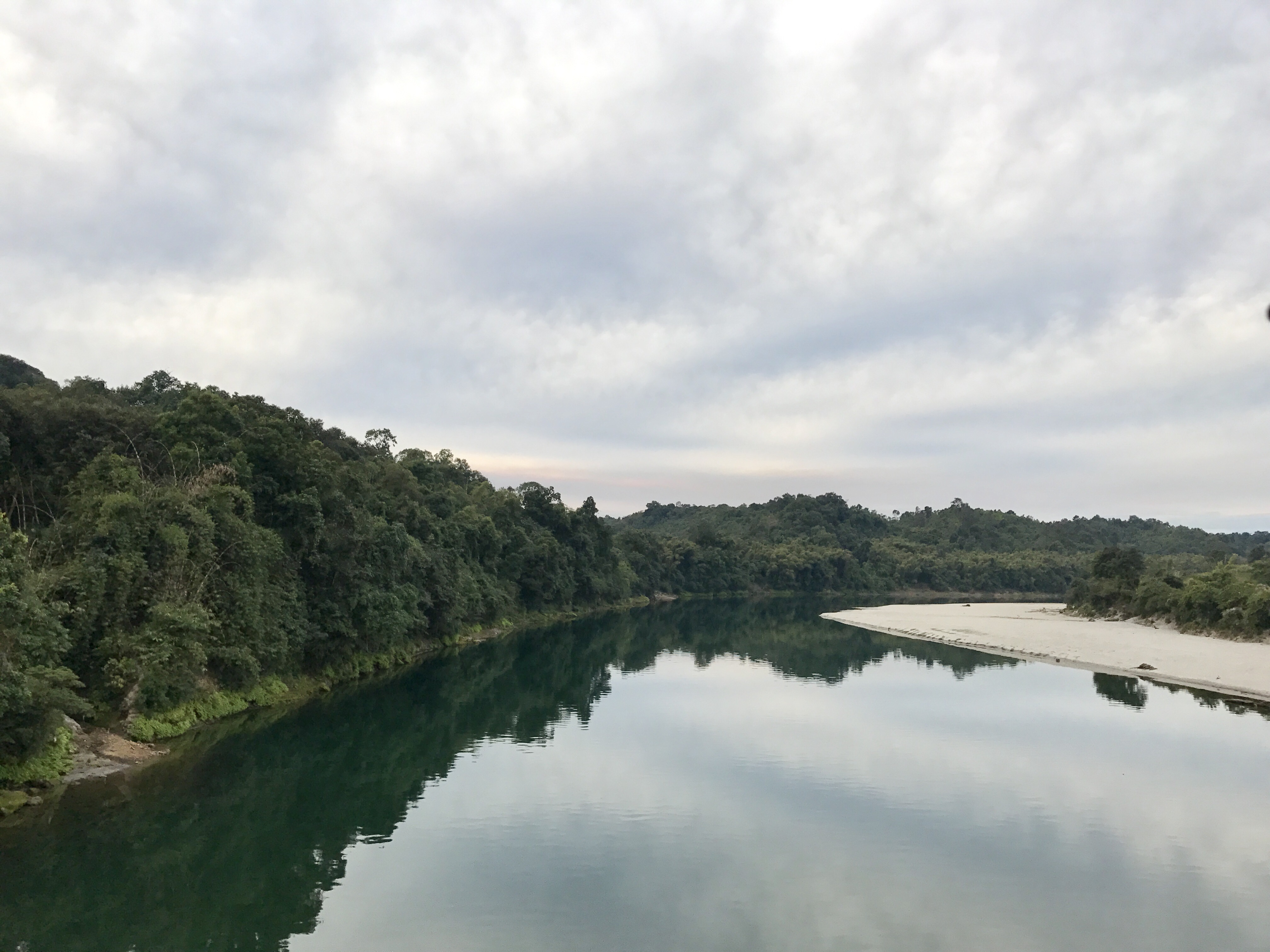
- Mali Hka near Machanbaw

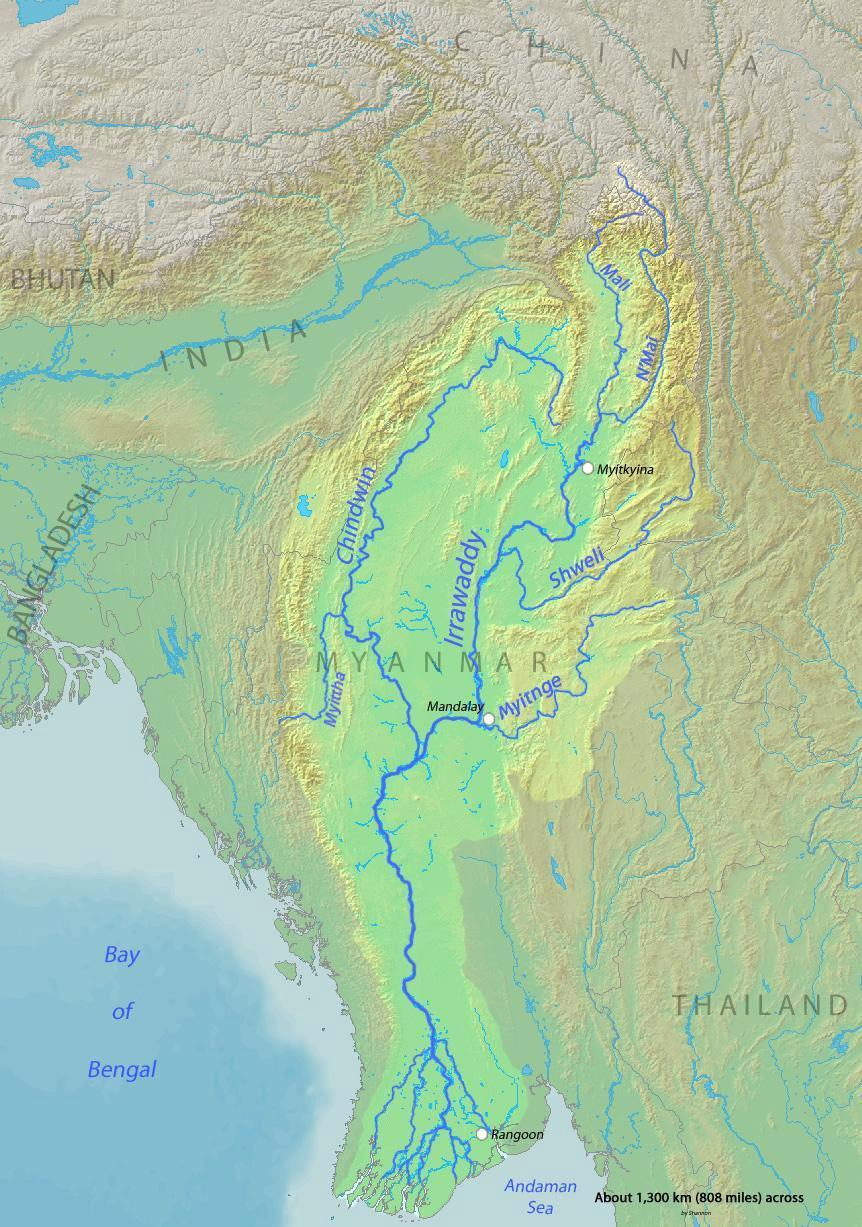

Location
- Country: Myanmar

Physical characteristics
- Source
  - location: Kachin Hills
- Mouth
  - location: Confluence with the N'Mai River
  - coordinates: 25°42′37″N 97°30′10″E
  - elevation: 150 m (490 ft)
- Length: 320 kilometres (200 mi)
- Basin size: 23,220.8 km^{2} (8,965.6 mi^{2})
- Discharge
  - average: 2,693.3 m^{3}/s (95,110 cu ft/s)

Basin features
- River system: Ayeyarwady

The Mali River (Jinghpaw: Mali Hka; Shan: ၼမ်ႉၵဵဝ်, Nam Kiu) is a river that originates in the hills of Kachin State, in the northernmost border region of Myanmar. It flows approximately 320 km, before meeting the N'Mai River and forming the Ayeyarwady River.

== History ==
Construction of the proposed Myitsone Dam was planned at the confluence of the Mali and the N'Mai River. On 30 September 2011, amid democratic reforms in the country, President Thein Sein announced that the Myitsone Dam project would be suspended during his tenure.

== See also ==
- List of rivers of Myanmar
