= N'Mai River =

N'Mai River N'Mai Hka / မေခမြစ်

Location
- Country: China, Myanmar

Physical characteristics
- Source
  - location: Confluence of Dulong River, Near Kawnglanghpu
- Mouth
  - location: Confluence with the Mali River
  - coordinates: 25°42′37″N 97°30′10″E
  - elevation: 150 m (490 ft)
- Length: 230.88 km (143.46 mi)
- Basin size: 24,336.7 km^{2} (9,396.5 sq mi)
- Discharge
  - average: 1,383.3 m^{3}/s (48,850 cu ft/s)

Basin features
- River system: Ayeyarwady

The N'Mai River or N'Mai Hka (Burmese: မေခမြစ်, Burmese pronunciation: [mè kʰa̰ mjɪʔ]) is a river in northern Myanmar (Burma). The northern part of the river is sometimes referred to as the Nam Tamai.

== Course ==
The N'Mai runs parallel to the Mali River, and has its source in the Himalayan glaciers of eastern Tibet at about 28° north latitude. It is not navigable because of strong currents. The N'mai ends at its confluence (Myit-son) with the Mali River in Kachin State where the two rivers combine to form the Ayeyarwady River.

The confluence is "one of the most significant cultural heritage sites for the Kachin people and an important landmark for all of Burma."

Construction of the proposed Myitsone Dam was planned at the confluence of the Mali and the N'Mai River. It has been suspended since 30 September 2011, when amid democratic reforms in the country, President Thein Sein announced he was suspending construction on the Myitsone Dam project for the duration of his tenure, as the project was contrary to the will of the people.

== History ==
The British forester and ornithologist Bertram E. Smythies studied the area in the 1940s. More recently, Kalaya Lu, Assistant Lecturer in the Department of Botany at Myitkyina University between 2002 and 2006, published a paper on plant diversity in the river watershed, concluding that it consists of different ecosystems, ranging in elevation from 800 metres to more than 4,600 metres, and containing some of the richest areas of Sino-Himalaya flora diversity in the world.

In 2007, the government of Myanmar signed an agreement with China Power Investment Corporation to construct a series of dams on the Ayeyarwady, Mali, and N’Mai rivers. For the N'Mai, one on the Mali, and one at the confluence, up to five dams were proposed. This dam, the largest of the seven, would destroy the confluence. Construction started in 2008 and a local protest about one of the dams at Chibwe met with government suppression.

== See also ==
- Eastern Himalayan alpine shrub and meadows
- Northern Triangle temperate forests
