= Ava Bridge =

Bridge in Sagaing Region, Myanmar

Ava Bridge အင်းဝ တံတား
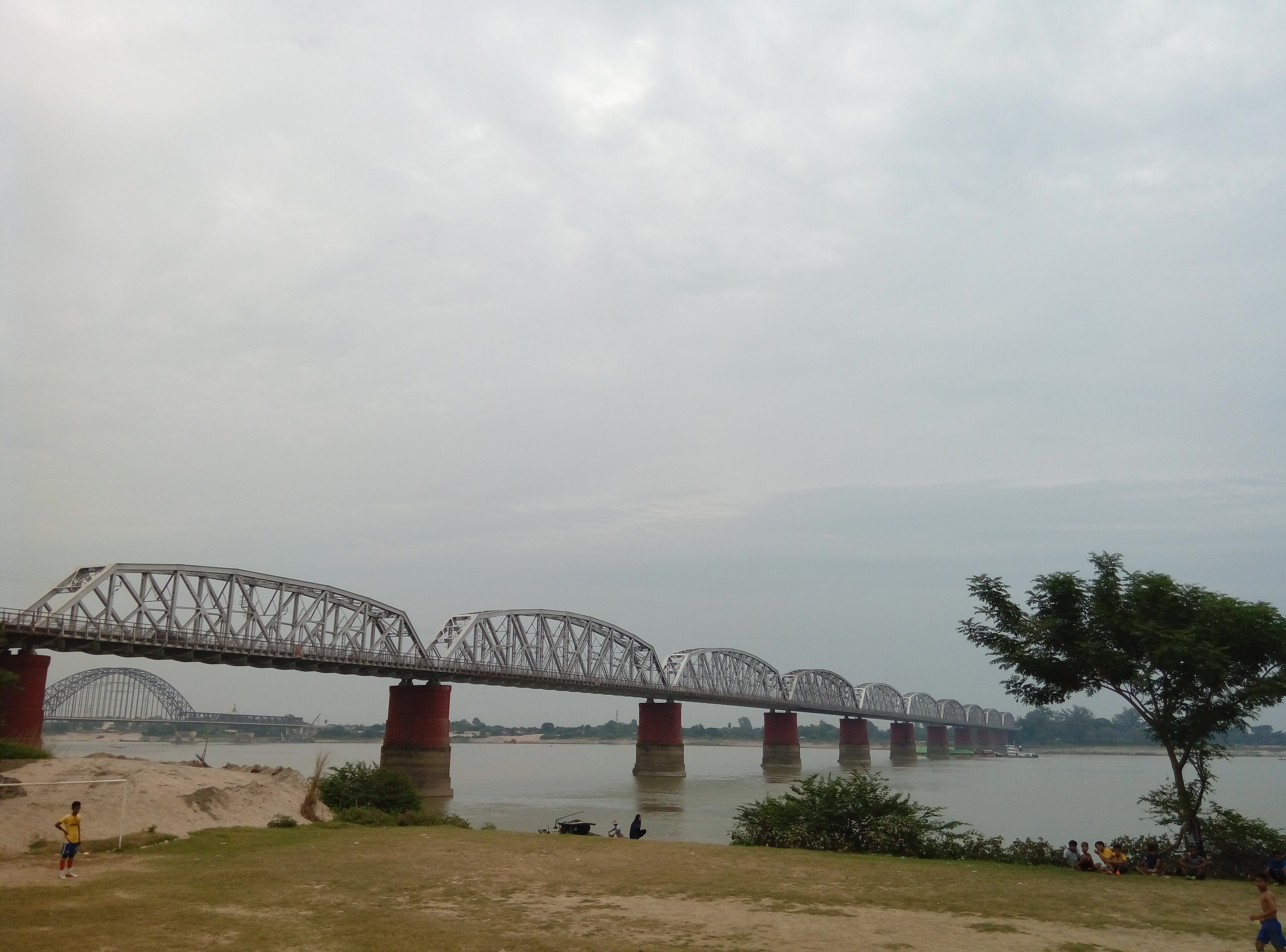
- Ava Bridge over the Irrawaddy River in 2017
- Coordinates: 21.8718°N 95.9920°E
- Carried: Rail and road traffic
- Crossed: Irrawaddy River
- Locale: Sagaing Region, Myanmar

Characteristics
- Design: Simple truss bridge with Pennsylvania (Petit) trusses
- Material: Steel
- Total length: 890 m (2,920 ft)
- Longest span: 144 m (472 ft)
- No. of spans: 9
- Piers in water: 7

History
- Constructed by: British engineers
- Opened: 1934
- Rebuilt: 1954 (after World War II damage)
- Collapsed: 2025 (due to the Myanmar earthquake)

Location
- Interactive map of Ava Bridge

The Ava Bridge (Burmese: အင်းဝတံတား) was a former road and railway bridge spanning the Irrawaddy River between Ava and Sagaing in Myanmar. Built by the British in 1934, it was destroyed during World War II and rebuilt in 1954. It was the only bridge across the river until the construction of additional crossings in the early 21st century. The bridge collapsed during the 2025 Myanmar earthquake.

== History ==
The bridge was opened in 1934 by Governor Sir Hugh Lansdown Stephenson and carried road, rail and pedestrian traffic across the Irrawaddy. Its opening boosted the flow of trade in the country. It was also known as the Old Sagaing Bridge, and it linked the Mandalay and Sagaing regions. During World War II, British troops dynamited the structure repeatedly as they retreated, reportedly around 18 times, before the center of the bridge finally collapsed.

The bridge, then 91 years old, collapsed on the afternoon of Friday 28 March 2025, during a 7.7-magnitude earthquake whose epicenter was near the town of Sagaing. The quake affected both Myanmar and Thailand, and several buildings in Mandalay, Naypyitaw and other areas collapsed as well. The tremor struck at about 13:21 local time and led to a state of emergency being declared. Video footage verified by Reuters captured sections of the bridge falling, and early reports described the collapse of the historic crossing over the Irrawaddy in Mandalay, Myanmar's second-largest city, as partial. The loss of the span, which had been a vital road and rail link between Mandalay and Sagaing, added to the wider damage to infrastructure across central Myanmar.

Due to the 2025 Myanmar earthquake, the bridge collapsed into the Irrawaddy River. Additionally, there were severe ground cracks around the bridge in the soil.

== See also ==
- List of structures and infrastructure affected by the 2025 Myanmar earthquake
