= List of tallest structures in Myanmar =

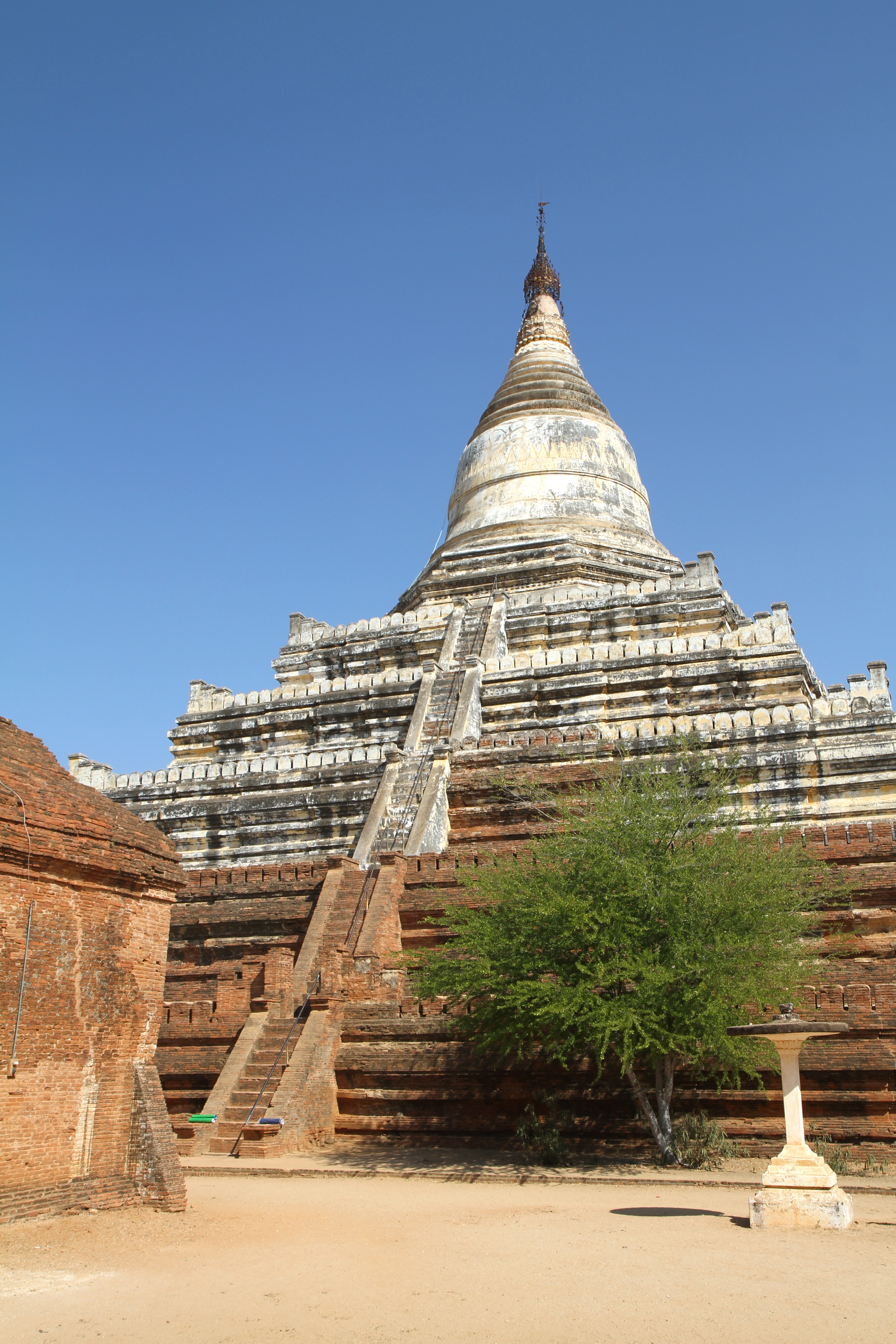
The 100-meter tall Shwesandaw in Bagan— the country's tallest structure by architectural height for nearly nine centuries (c. 1057–1954) and tallest by pinnacle height at least until 1775

This is a list of the tallest structures in Myanmar. The list has two main parts: one list for the tallest buildings above 90 m (295 ft), and another list for other tallest structures above 60 m (197 ft). The lists are based on publicly available data and may likely be incomplete as the information on structures and buildings in the country is poorly documented and/or not publicly available.

The vast majority of the country's recorded tallest structures have been Buddhist pagodas and statues. The country has had a 100 m (328 ft) tall pagoda since the 11th century in the Shwesandaw Pagoda in Bagan (Pagan). The 134 m (440 ft) Yeywa Dam in Kyaukse is currently the tallest structure in the country.

== Tallest buildings ==
See List of tallest buildings in Myanmar.

== Tallest structures except buildings, masts or towers ==
The following is a list of tallest known structures above 60 m (197 ft) in Myanmar, excluding buildings, guyed masts, or cellular towers, ranked by their pinnacle height.

Many of the structures on the list are Buddhist stupas (pagodas), temples, and statues. Many pagodas have been rebuilt many times throughout their history, often taller. Furthermore, Burmese pagodas are typically measured by their architectural height (nyandaw) without including the height of the hti spire. The htis are replaced periodically, and the new htis may change in size and height, thus altering the overall pinnacle height of their pagoda. Height estimates are given in italics.

The list may not be complete or up-to-date.

Rank	Name	Image	Location	Height: m (ft)	Pinnacle height m (ft)	Year Completed	Type	Notes	References
1	Yeywa Dam		Kyaukse	134 m (440 ft)	134 m (440 ft)	2010	dam		
2	Lower Paunglaung Dam		Pyinmana	131 m (430 ft)	131 m (430 ft)	2005	dam		
3	Laykyun Sekkya		Monywa	116 m (381 ft)	129.4 m (425 ft)	2008	statue	3rd tallest statue in the world pinnacle height includes the 13.4 meter throne	
4	Shwemawdaw Pagoda		Bago	22 m (72 ft)?	?	by 1390	stupa	2500+ years old, according to tradition Tallest pagoda in Myanmar since 1954	
4	Shwemawdaw Pagoda		Bago	90 m (295 ft)	98.8 m (324 ft)	1796	stupa	2500+ years old, according to tradition Tallest pagoda in Myanmar since 1954	(Note: (Chihara 1996: 253) gives the total height as 99 m (325 ft) but (White 1923: 183) gives 324 ft (98.8 m).)
4	Shwemawdaw Pagoda		Bago	114 m (374 ft)	125 m (410 ft)	1954	stupa	2500+ years old, according to tradition Tallest pagoda in Myanmar since 1954	(Note: (Chihara 1996: 253) gives the total height as 99 m (325 ft) but (White 1923: 183) gives 324 ft (98.8 m).)
5	Shwedagon Pagoda		Yangon	?	?	?	stupa	2500+ years old according to tradition	
5	Shwedagon Pagoda		Yangon	18 m (59 ft)	?	1362/63	stupa	2500+ years old according to tradition	
5	Shwedagon Pagoda		Yangon	40 m (131 ft)	?	1462	stupa	2500+ years old according to tradition	
5	Shwedagon Pagoda		Yangon	99 m (325 ft)	?	1775	stupa	2500+ years old according to tradition	
5	Shwedagon Pagoda		Yangon	99 m (325 ft)	112 m (367 ft)	1871	stupa	2500+ years old according to tradition	
6	Uppatasanti Pagoda		Naypyidaw	98.7 m (324 ft)	111.7 m (366 ft)	2009	stupa	Replica of the Shwedagon but 30 cm shorter; presumably, its hti is also of the same height as the Shwedagon's.	
7	Upper Paunglaung Dam		Naypyidaw	103 m (338 ft)	103 m (338 ft)	2015	dam		
8	Goteik viaduct		Nawnghkio	102 m (335 ft)	102 m (335 ft)	1900	bridge	Most of the viaduct's pillars destroyed during WWII. Rebuilt in 1951.	
8	Goteik viaduct		Nawnghkio	102 m (335 ft)	102 m (335 ft)	1951	bridge	Most of the viaduct's pillars destroyed during WWII. Rebuilt in 1951.	
9	Shwesandaw Pagoda		Bagan	100 m (328 ft)	?	1057	stupa	Tallest pagoda in Bagan	
10	Dapein I Dam		Bhamo	83.5 m (274 ft)	83.5 m (274 ft)	2011	dam		
11	Statue of Gautama Buddha		Kyaikto	78 m (256 ft)	?	2019	statue		
12	Yangon Radar Station		Yangon	75 m (246 ft)	75 m (246 ft)	2016	radar tower	18 stories tall	
13	Thatbyinnyu Temple		Bagan	61.3 m (201 ft)	66 m (217 ft)	1150/51	temple	Tallest temple in Bagan	
14	Htupayon Pagoda		Sagaing	?	?	1454/55	stupa		(Note: (MNA 2016) gives the height as 202 feet (61.5m) but (Moore, Win Maung 2016: 168–169) says the pagoda's height was raised by 10 meters from the original height of 49 meters, meaning the new height is now 59 meters (193.5 feet). The 61.5 meter height is likely inclusive of the hti (umbrella or spire).)
14	Htupayon Pagoda		Sagaing	?	?	1605/06	stupa		(Note: (MNA 2016) gives the height as 202 feet (61.5m) but (Moore, Win Maung 2016: 168–169) says the pagoda's height was raised by 10 meters from the original height of 49 meters, meaning the new height is now 59 meters (193.5 feet). The 61.5 meter height is likely inclusive of the hti (umbrella or spire).)
14	Htupayon Pagoda		Sagaing	49 m (161 ft)	?	1851/52	stupa		(Note: (MNA 2016) gives the height as 202 feet (61.5m) but (Moore, Win Maung 2016: 168–169) says the pagoda's height was raised by 10 meters from the original height of 49 meters, meaning the new height is now 59 meters (193.5 feet). The 61.5 meter height is likely inclusive of the hti (umbrella or spire).)
14	Htupayon Pagoda		Sagaing	59 m (194 ft)	61.5 m (202 ft)	2016	stupa		(Note: (MNA 2016) gives the height as 202 feet (61.5m) but (Moore, Win Maung 2016: 168–169) says the pagoda's height was raised by 10 meters from the original height of 49 meters, meaning the new height is now 59 meters (193.5 feet). The 61.5 meter height is likely inclusive of the hti (umbrella or spire).)
15	Nan-Myint Tower		Bagan	60 m (197 ft)	60 m (197 ft)	2005	Tower	Observation tower for the Bagan Archeological Zone; consists of 13 levels/stories	

== Timeline of tallest structures ==
=== By architectural height ===
This is a list of tallest known structures in Myanmar as measured by architectural height without including spires such as htis or antennas.

The list may not be complete or up-to-date.

Name	Image	Location	Height: m (ft)	Pinnacle height m (ft)	Years as tallest	Notes	References
Shwesandaw Pagoda		Bagan	100 m (328 ft)	?	c. 1057–1954	Tallest pagoda in Bagan	
Shwemawdaw Pagoda		Bago	114 m (374 ft)	125 m (410 ft)	1954–2005	Tallest pagoda in Myanmar	
Lower Paunglaung Dam		Pyinmana	131 m (430 ft)	131 m (430 ft)	2005–2010		
Yeywa Dam		Kyaukse	134 m (440 ft)	134 m (440 ft)	2010–present		

=== By pinnacle height ===
This is a list of tallest known structures in Myanmar as measured by pinnacle height.

The list may not be complete or up-to-date.

Name	Image	Location	Height: m (ft)	Pinnacle height m (ft)	Years as tallest	Notes	References
Shwesandaw Pagoda		Bagan	100 m (328 ft)	?	c. 1057–1775 or 1871	Tallest pagoda in Bagan	
Shwedagon Pagoda		Yangon	99 m (325 ft)	112 m (367 ft)	1775 or 1871–1954		
Shwemawdaw Pagoda		Bago	114 m (374 ft)	125 m (410 ft)	1954–2005	Tallest pagoda in Myanmar	
Lower Paunglaung Dam		Pyinmana	131 m (430 ft)	131 m (430 ft)	2005–2010		
Yeywa Dam		Kyaukse	134 m (440 ft)	134 m (440 ft)	2010–present		

== See also ==
- List of tallest buildings in Yangon

== Bibliography ==
- Chihara, Daigoro (1996). Jan Fontein (ed.). "Hindu–Buddhist Architecture". Studies in Asian Art and Archaeology. XIX. Leiden: E.J. Brill. ISBN 90-04-10512-3.
- Foer, Joshua; Ella Morton; Dylan Thuras. Atlas Obscura: An Explorer's Guide to the World's Hidden Wonders (2 ed.). p. 170. ISBN 9781523508471.
- Langmead, Donald; Garnault, Christine (2001). Encyclopedia of Architectural and Engineering Feats. ABC-CLIO. ISBN 9781576071120.
- Moore, Elizabeth H.; Win Maung (Tampawaddy) (June 2016). "The Social Dynamics of Pagoda Repair in Upper Myanmar". Journal of Burma Studies. 20 (1). NUS Press: 149–198. doi:10.1353/jbs.2016.0006. S2CID 148063193.
- Myanmar News Agency (2016-03-16). "Holy symbols hoisted atop Sagaing Htupayon Pagoda". Global New Light of Myanmar. Archived from the original on July 3, 2017.
- Ministry of Religious Affairs and Culture, Myanmar (2018-12-06). "Shwedagon Pagoda on Singuttara Hill". UNESCO.
- White, Herbert Thirkell (1923). Burma: Provincial Geographies of India. Cambridge University Press.
