= Shwemawdaw Pagoda =

Buddhist pagoda in Bago, Myanmar

- ရွှေမောဓော စေတီတော်
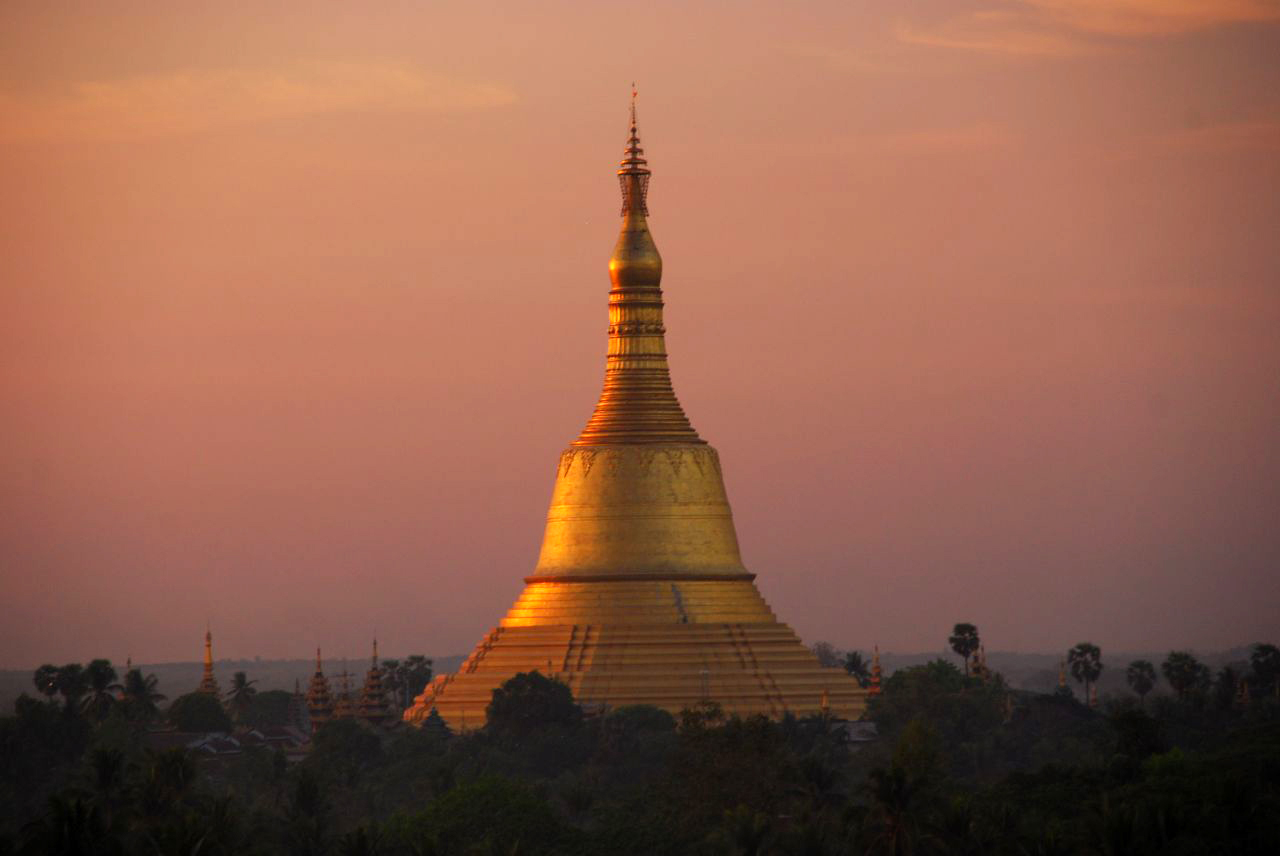

- Location within Myanmar

Religion
- Affiliation: Buddhism
- Sect: Theravada Buddhism
- Region: Bago Region
- Festival: Shwemawdaw Pagoda Festival (Tagu)
- Status: active

Location
- Municipality: Bago
- Country: Myanmar
- Coordinates: 17.3368744°N 96.496954°E

Architecture
- Completed: c. 500 BCE (tradition); 982/83 (tradition); by 1390; 1796; 1954

Specifications
- Height (max): nyandaw architectural height: 22 m (72 ft) (982/83); 90 m (295 ft) (1796); 114 m (374 ft) (1954)
- Spire height: hti spire height inclusive: 98.8 m (324 ft) (1796); 125 m (410 ft) (1954)

The Shwemawdaw Pagoda (Burmese: ရွှေမောဓော စေတီတော် [ʃwè mɔ̀dɔ́ pʰəjá]; Mon: ကျာ်မုဟ်တ [tɕaɪʔmṵtú]) is a Buddhist stupa located in Bago, Myanmar. At 125 m (410 ft) in overall height, the Shwemadaw is the tallest stupa in the world. (Note: According to Chihara Daigoro, the Phra Pathom Chedi in Thailand is over 120 meters high, and the current Shwemawdaw Pagoda, rebuilt in 1954, stands at 125 meters.)

The annual pagoda festival is a 10-day affair that takes place during the Burmese month of Tagu.

== History ==
According to tradition, the original version of the pagoda was built during the lifetime of the Buddha. Two merchant brothers Kullasala and Mahasala had received two strands of hair from the Buddha himself, and upon their return to their native land, built a 22 m (72 ft) tall stupa, with the two strands in the relic chamber. In 982/83 CE (344 ME), a sacred tooth was added to the collection. According to Donald Stadtner, this tradition emerged only in the late 18th century (between 1754 and 1795), perhaps to elevate the stature of the pagoda to that of the Shwedagon Pagoda.

The historical pagoda dates from at least the late 14th century when Pegu became the capital of Hanthawaddy. Successive monarchs made additions to the pagoda and/or its premises. King Razadarit built 160 small stupas around the pagoda in 1390 while King Dhammazedi donated a bell in the late 15th century. In 1556, King Bayinnaung installed a hti spire umbrella with jewels from his crown, and built 52 stupas, signifying his age at the time. In 1796, King Bodawpaya raised the pagoda to 90 m (295 ft), and added a new hti spire umbrella for an overall height of 98.8 m (324 ft).

The pagoda had been severely damaged several times due to earthquakes, including one in 1912, another in 1917 and another in 1930. Portions of the fallen pre-1917 version of the pagoda remain at the site. Repair work began in 1951 and completed in 1954. The new stupa itself stands at 114 m (374 ft). Its overall height (including the hti spire) is 125 m (410 ft).

== Images ==
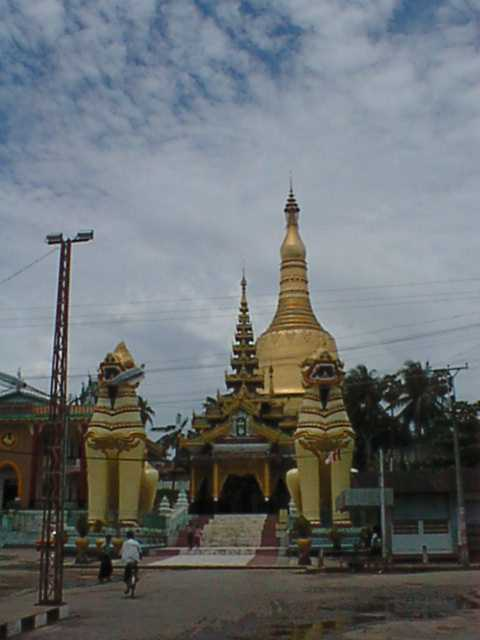
Kyaikmuhdaw exterior

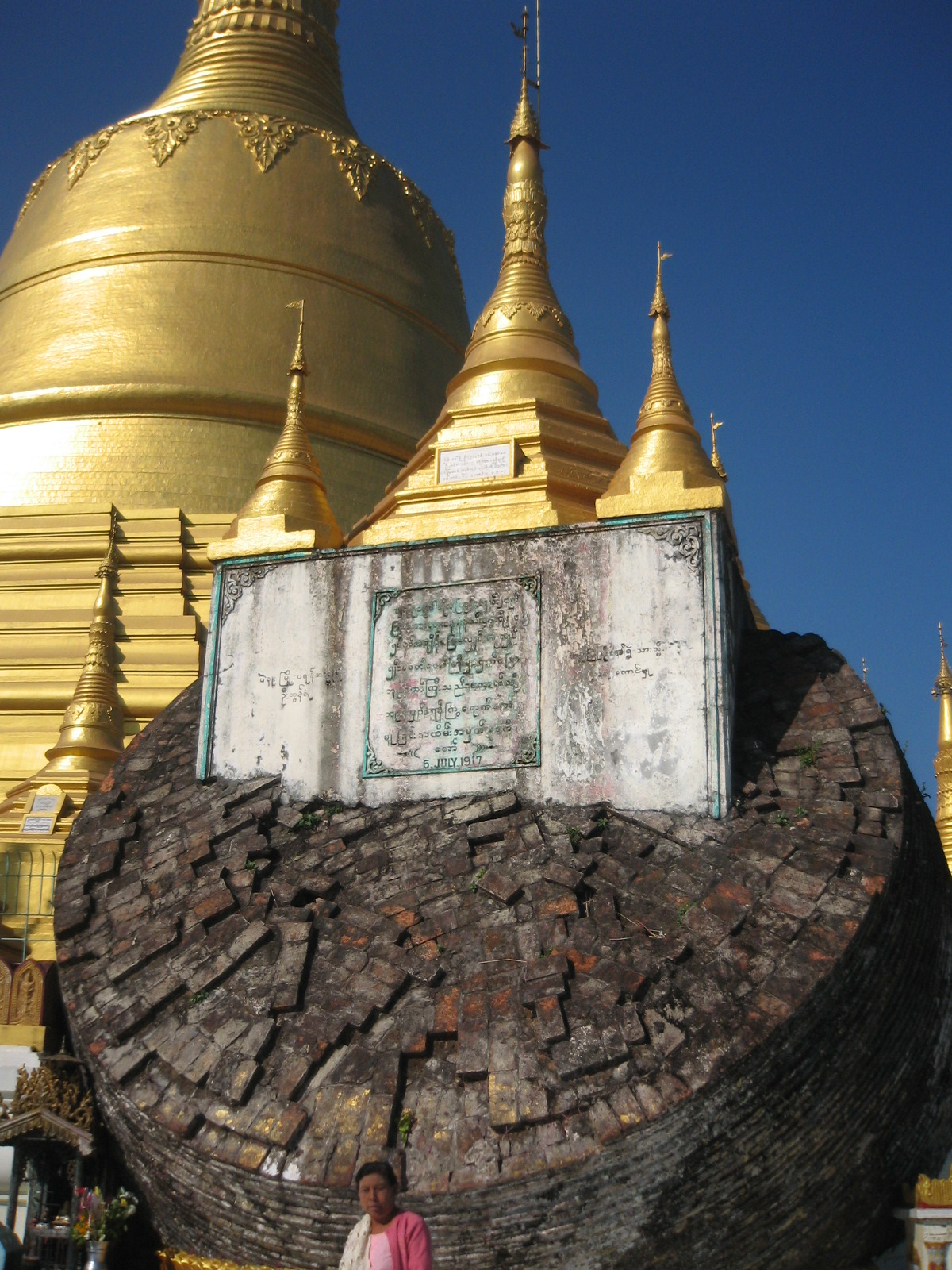
Old Royal Umbrella which collapsed due to an earthquake in 1917

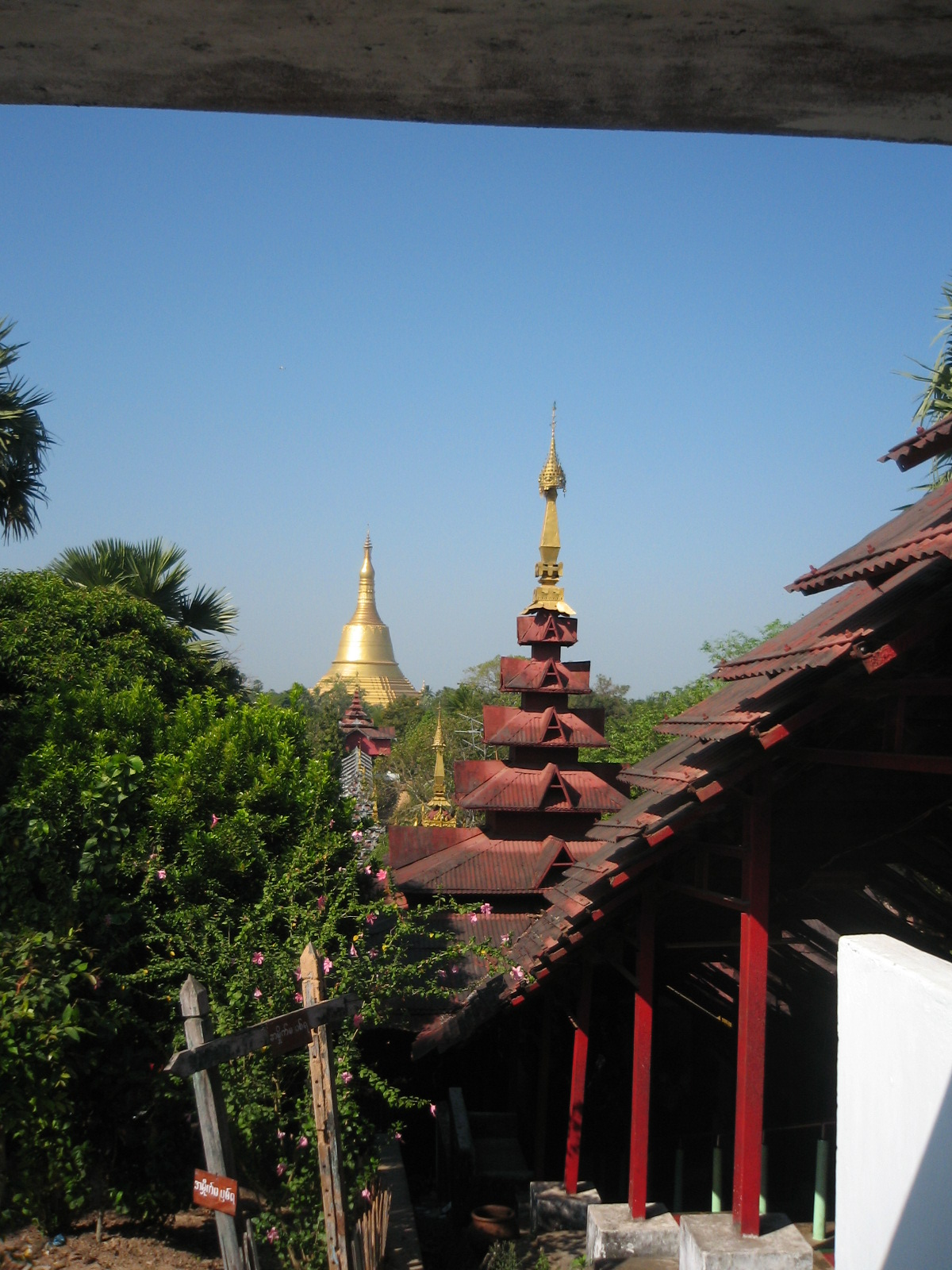
Shwemawdaw from Hintha Gon

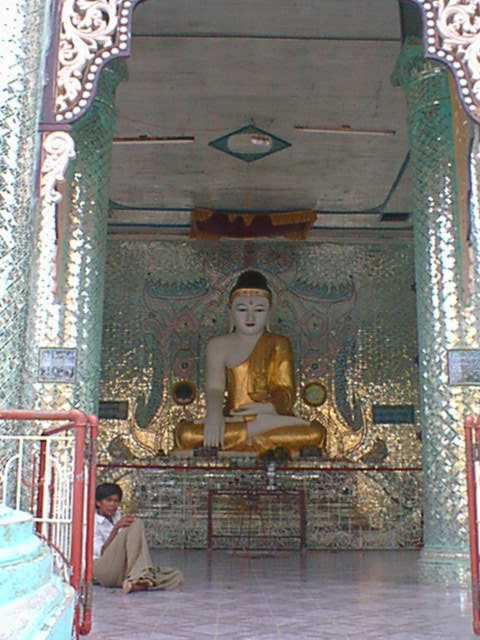
Sculpture at Shwemawdaw Paya

== See also ==
- List of tallest structures built before the 20th century

== Bibliography ==
- Chihara, Daigoro (1996). Jan Fontein (ed.). "Hindu–Buddhist Architecture". Studies in Asian Art and Archaeology. XIX. Leiden: E.J. Brill. ISBN 90-04-10512-3.
- De Thabrew, W. Vivian (2014). Buddhist Monuments and Temples of Myanmar and Thailand. ISBN 978-1-4918-9621-1.
- Pan Hla, Nai (2005) [1968]. Razadarit Ayedawbon (in Burmese) (8th printing ed.). Yangon: Armanthit Sarpay.
- Zaw Winn (28 April 2008). "Shwemawdaw Pagoda welcomes in the New Year". Myanmar Times. Archived from the original on 8 November 2011.
- A.J. Page, ed. (1917). "Pegu District". Burma Gazetteer. A. Rangoon: Government Printing Burma.
- White, Herbert Thirkell (1923). Burma: Provincial Geographies of India. Cambridge University Press.
- "Shwemawdaw Pagoda". Oriental Culture.
