= Wat Ming Mueang, Chiang Rai =

Buddhist temple in Chiang Rai, Thailand

Coordinates: 19°54′35″N 99°49′35″E

Wat Ming Mueang
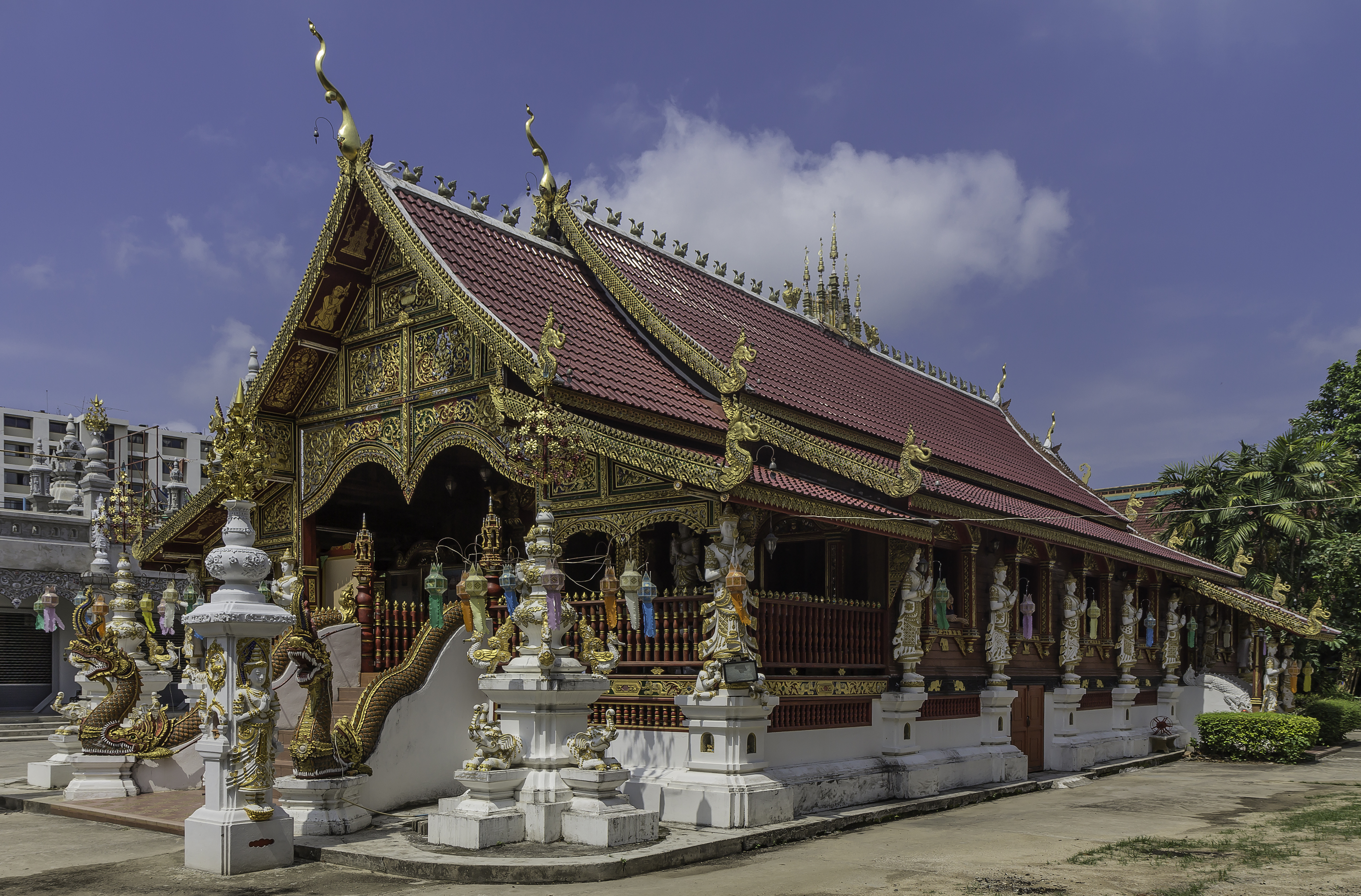

Religion
- Affiliation: Buddhism
- Sect: Therevada Buddhism

Location
- Location: 2415 Ruangnakron Road, Mueang Chiang Rai district, Chiang Rai, Chiang Rai province
- Country: Thailand
- Interactive map of Wat Ming Mueang

Architecture
- Style: Burmese (Shan) and Lan Na
- Established: 13th century

Wat Ming Mueang is a Buddhist temple in Chiang Rai, Northern Thailand. It was built in the 13th century in honour of Ua Ming Chom Mueang, the mother of King Mangrai, the founder of the Lan Na Kingdom.

== History ==
No direct evidence has been found on the date of the construction of the temple but it is associated with the founding of Chiang Rai by King Mangrai in 1262. A Burmese inscription on a gold plate suggests that its founder was a consort of King Mangrai who established the temple in honour of King Mangrai's mother Ua Ming Chom Mueang, also known as Queen Thep Khamkhai, whose portrait hangs in the viharn.

During the 19th century, the Shan people took over the site, erected buildings in the Burmese style, and called the temple Wat Ngiao, while local people called it Wat Chang Moop or the temple of the crouching elephant. In recent years, renovations have been carried out in the style of Lan Na. In 1970, the temple received its Royal Charter.

== Description ==
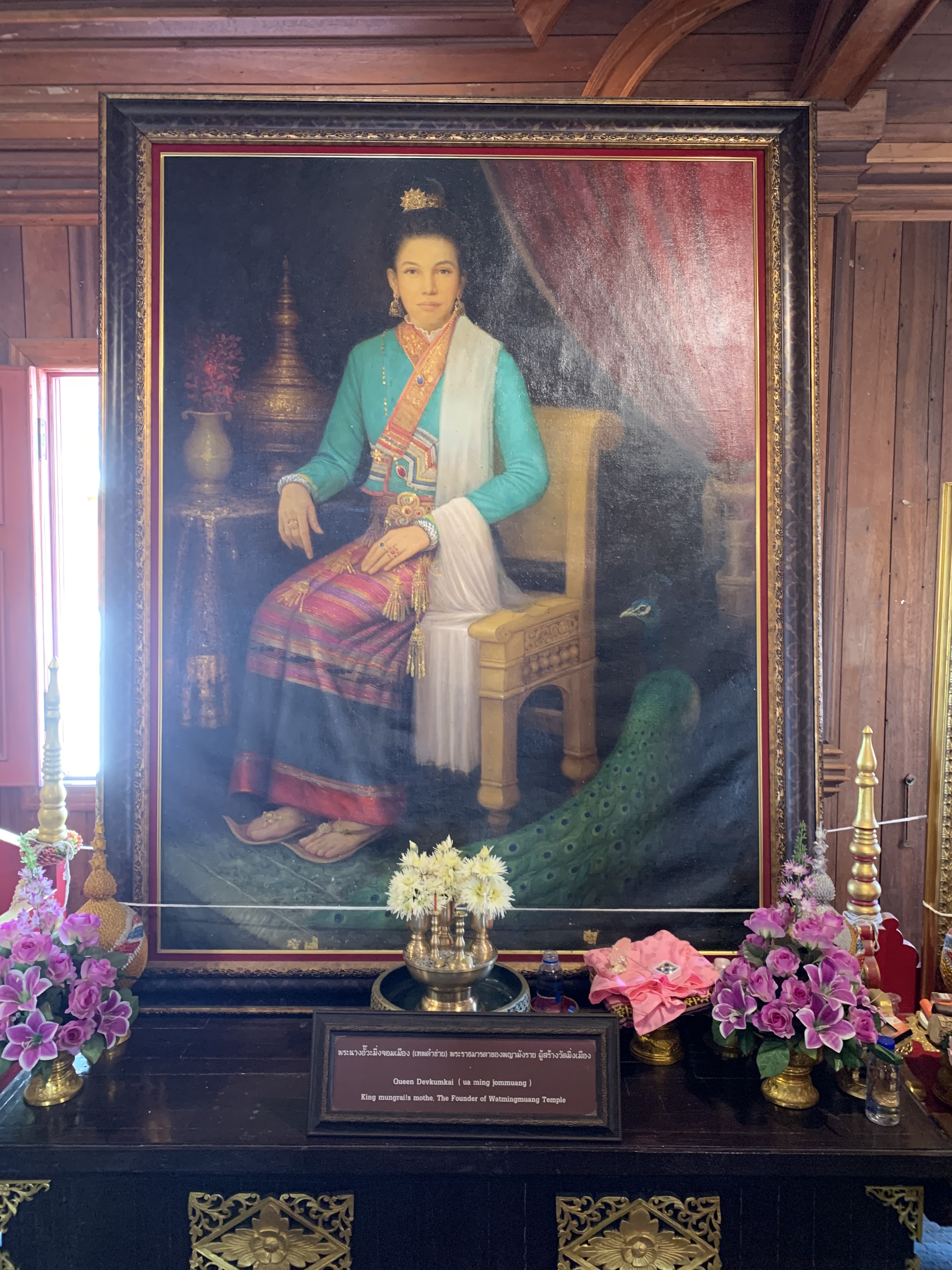
Portrait of Ua Ming Chom Mueang, mother of King Mangrai, at Wat Ming Mueang

Wat Ming Mueang is known for its mix of Shan and Lan Na architectural styles as seen in its ornate wooden viharn. On its ceiling is a depiction of the Traibhumikatha or the Three Worlds story. The principal Buddha image is a 400 year old stucco image (Luangpho phra si ming mueang) whose head is adorned with a lotus-shaped carving made from crystal. In its own shrine is a Shan type of Buddha originating from the Kengtung area of the Shan States, seated and made from wood and gilded. A third image is of the Thai Yuan type originally from Wat Thong Lo. A second, modern viharn has been built adjacent to the old viharn in the Lan Na style.

The chedi, originally constructed in the Burmese style, has been remodelled introducing elements of the Lan Na style. Four smaller pagodas have been erected at each corner of the chedi which is topped by a golden Burmese style umbrella or hti. At the front of the temple is an ancient well which has an arched roof decorated with reclining elephants. A stone at the site has an inscription with a date equivalent to 1524.
