= Shwesandaw Pagoda (Bagan) =

Buddhist Pagoda in Bagan, Myanmar

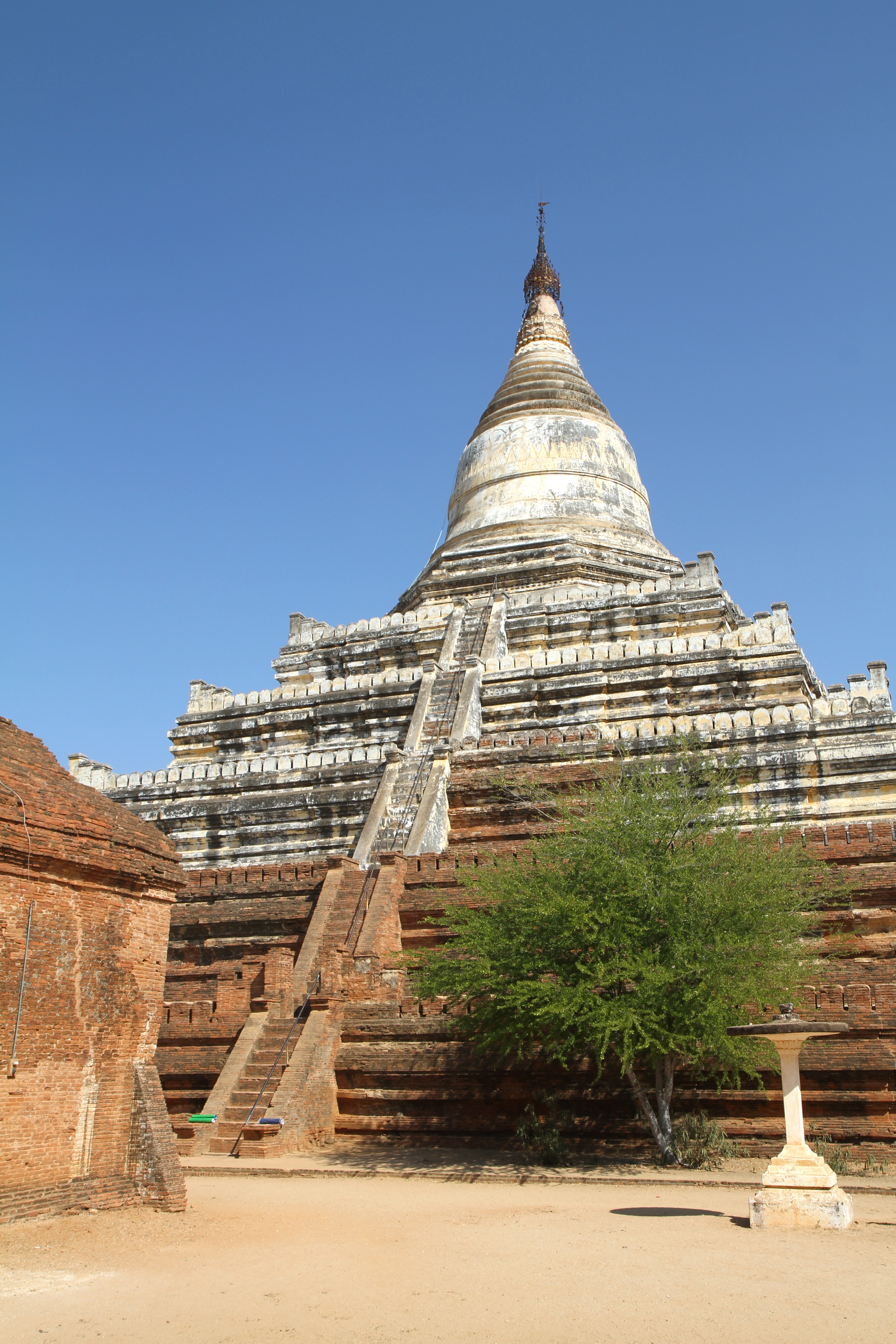

- Location within Myanmar

Religion
- Affiliation: Theravada Buddhism

Location
- Location: Nyaung U
- Country: Myanmar
- Coordinates: 21.163812°N 94.866037°E

Architecture
- Founder: King Anawrahta
- Completed: 1057; 969 years ago

Specifications
- Height (max): 50 m (164 ft)
- Spire height: ?

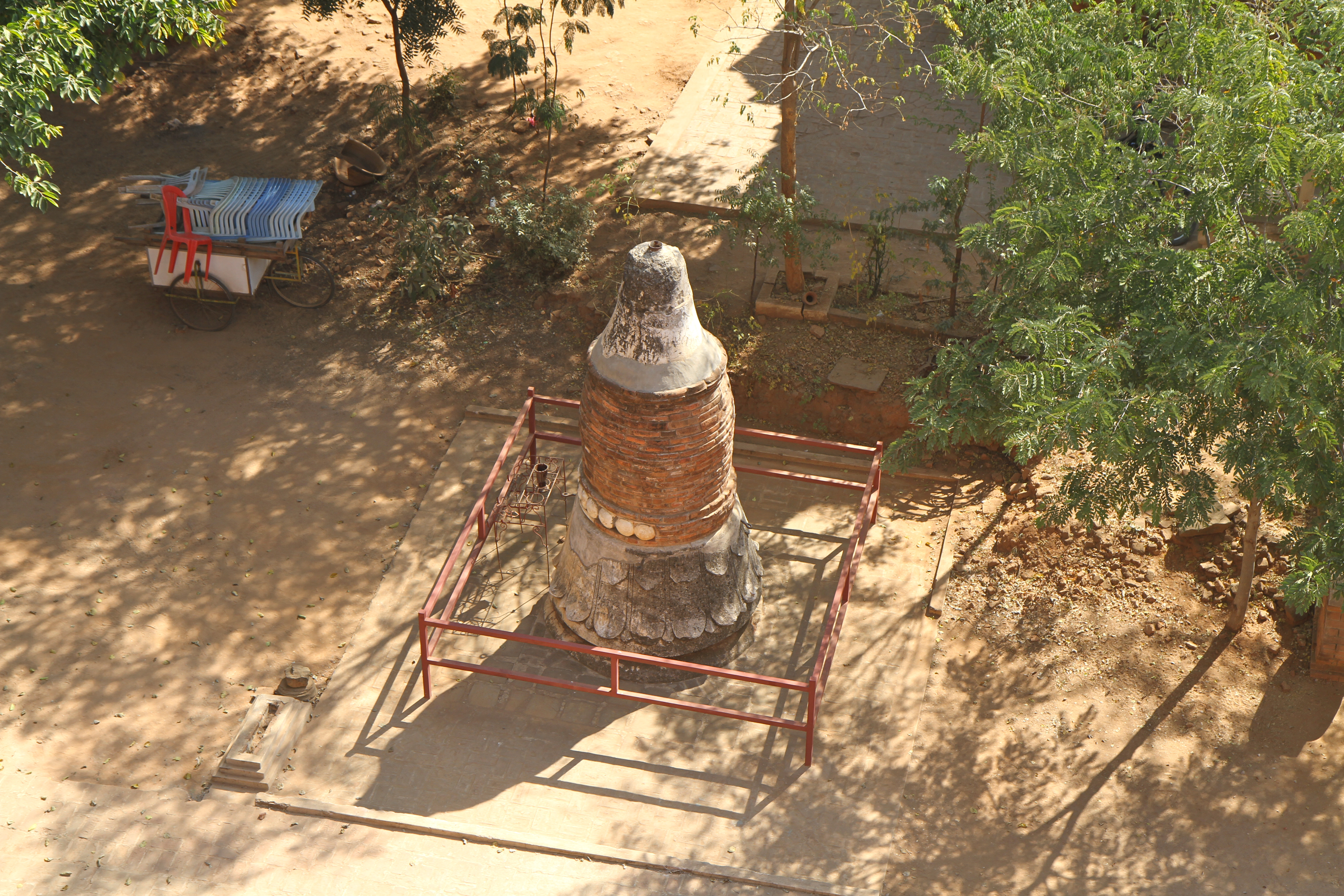
Shwesandaw Paya's original hti, toppled by an earthquake in 1975

The Shwesandaw Pagoda (Burmese: ရွှေဆံတော် ဘုရား, pronounced [ʃwèsʰàɰ̃dɔ̀ pʰəjá]) is a Buddhist pagoda located in Bagan, Myanmar. It is the tallest pagoda in Bagan, and features a series of five terraces, topped with a cylindrical stupa, which has a bejewelled umbrella (hti). The pagoda was built by King Anawrahta in 1057, and once contained terracotta tiles depicting scenes from the Jataka. Enshrined within the pagoda are sacred hairs of Gautama Buddha, which were obtained from Thaton.

According to many sources on the internet, the Shwesandaw pagoda is about 100 metres (328 ft) high. The problem is that measurements given for Bagan monuments are often inconsistent and, in some cases, simply unreliable. The actual height of the Shwesandaw is in the region of 50 – 55 metres.

== See also ==
- List of tallest structures built before the 20th century
