= Htupayon Pagoda =

Buddhist stupa located in Sagaing

- ထူပါရုံ ဘုရား

Religion
- Affiliation: Buddhism
- Sect: Theravada
- Ecclesiastical or organizational status: Temple
- Status: Active

Location
- Location: Sagaing
- Country: Myanmar
- Interactive map of Htupayon Pagoda
- Coordinates: 21°52′28″N 95°59′01″E

Architecture
- Founder: Narapati I of Ava
- Groundbreaking: 23 October 1444
- Completed: 1454/55 (original); 2016 (current)

Specifications
- Height (max): 59 m (194 ft) (current); 49 m (161 ft) (older)
- Spire height: 61.5 m (202 ft)

The Htupayon Pagoda (Burmese: ထူပါရုံ ဘုရား, pronounced [tʰù bà jòʊ̯ɴ pʰəjá]) is a Buddhist stupa located in Sagaing, Myanmar. The pagoda has experienced several earthquakes since its foundation in 1444, and undergone at least three major reconstructions. The current structure was completed in 2016.

== Foundation ==
Located near the Yadanabon Bridge in Sagaing, the Htupayon pagoda was founded by King Narapati I of Ava (r. 1442–1468) in 1444. Construction of the pagoda began on 23 October 1444, during the Chinese invasions of the kingdom (present-day Upper Myanmar). (Note: The editors of (Yazawin Thit Vol. 1 2012: 288, footnote 4) cite the Zedi-yakahta Yazawin by Monywe Sayadaw, and a contemporary stone inscription both of which say the pagoda's construction began on Friday, 13th waxing of Tazaungmon 806 ME (23 October 1444).) The initial phase of construction was completed about a year later in late 1445 or early 1446 (Note: Chronicles (Yazawin Thit Vol. 1 2012: 288), (Hmannan Vol. 2 2003: 87–88) say the ceremony at the pagoda's completion ceremony took place after the truce with the Chinese had been signed in 807 ME (1445/1446), and after the Burmese king had returned the renegade sawbwa of Mong Mao to the Chinese. According to the Chinese sources (Liew 1996: 185), the sawbwa was returned to Chinese custody in August 1445. The Burmese chronicles (Maha Yazawin Vol. 2 2006: 78–79) and (Hmannan Vol. 2 2003: 87–88) say the return took place shortly after Tuesday, 3rd waxing of Nadaw 807 ME (2 November 1445).) when the king held a ceremony commemorating the occasion at the pagoda. The ceremony was attended by the diplomats and royals from the neighboring countries, including the Chinese officials with whom he had just signed a truce, as well as those from Lan Na, Onbaung, Hanthawaddy Pegu and (unnamed) Indian states. Work on the pagoda continued for another nine years. Its relic chamber was filled and dedicated by the king in 1447/48 (809 ME); its hti (crowning umbrella) was raised only in 1454/55 (816 ME). (Note: (Moore, Win Maung 2016: 167) says the hti was raised in 1452 CE (816 ME), which is a typographical error. 816 ME corresponds to 1454/55 CE.) According to an undated inscription found at the pagoda, its height was 49 metres (161 ft).

== Earthquakes and reconstructions ==
The pagoda, located on the Sagaing Fault, has experienced repeated earthquakes: in 1501/02 (863 ME), 1512/13 (874 ME), 1590/91 (952 ME), 1648/49 (1010 ME), 1781/82 (1143 ME), 1839 (1201 ME), and 2012 (1374 ME). (Note: See (MNA 2016) for 863 ME, 874 ME and 952 ME earthquakes. (Moore, Win Maung 2016: 167) says "The stupa suffered from repeated earthquakes in 1590 CE (952 ME), 1645 CE (1010 ME), 1781 CE (1143 ME), and 1848 (1213 ME)." Most of (Moore, Win Maung)'s Burmese calendar to the Gregorian calendar translations are incorrect: 816 ME translates to 1454/55 CE (not 1452); 1010 ME to 1648/49 CE (not 1645); 1213 ME to 1851/1852 CE (not 1848). Furthermore, the 1213 ME date as a year in which the pagoda was hit by an earthquake is incorrect. Per (Maung Maung Tin Vol. 2 2004: 394), the Ava and Sagaing regions were hit by a series of earthquakes on 22–23 March 1839 (7th and 8th waxing of Tagu 1201 ME), with tremors following for several days, causing the complete destruction of the royal capital Ava. The 1213 ME date is when King Pagan Min tried to repair the pagoda.) The 1839 Ava earthquake severely damaged the pagoda, leaving only the 30 m (98 ft) high base intact. The 11 November 2012 earthquake left the pagoda with 15 major cracks that threatened total collapse.

The pagoda has undergone at least three major reconstructions. The first was in 1605/06 (967 ME). The second reconstruction project, in response to the 1839 earthquake damages, was launched in 1851/52 (1213 ME) but was cut short as its sponsor King Pagan Min (r. 1846–1853) became ensnarled in, and lost the Second Anglo-Burmese War (1852–1853), and subsequently abdicated the throne in 1853. The pagoda was eventually topped off with a small, disproportionate dome. The third came after the 2012 earthquake. The reconstruction committee, led by Ven. Sitagu Sayadaw, rebuilt the pagoda with a slightly enlarged form of an older (original?) profile of the pagoda, as described in an undated inscription found at the pagoda but with a wider base (additional 90 cm on each side) and a taller height (additional 10m). The small stupas that before ringed the base of the pagoda were moved to make room for the change. The pagoda's relic chamber was modeled after the Thuparamaya pagoda in Anuradhapura, Sri Lanka. The newly reconstructed pagoda was consecrated on 16 March 2016. The new height of the pagoda is 61.5 metres (202 ft). (Note: (MNA 2016) gives the height as 202 feet (62 m) but (Moore, Win Maung 2016: 168–169) says the pagoda's height was raised by 10 metres (33 ft) from the original height of 49 meters, meaning the new height is now 59 metres (194 ft). The 61.5 m (202 ft) height is likely inclusive of the hti (umbrella or spire).)

== See also ==
- List of tallest structures built before the 20th century

== Bibliography ==
- Insight Guides (2018). Insight Guides Myanmar (11 ed.). Apa Publications (UK) Limited. ISBN 9781789192919.
- Liew, Foon Ming (1996). "The Luchuan-Pingmian Campaigns (1436–1449) in the Light of Official Chinese Historiography". Oriens Extremus. 39 (2). Harrassowitz Verlag: 162–203. JSTOR 24047471.
- Myanmar News Agency (2016-03-16). "Holy symbols hoisted atop Sagaing Htupayon Pagoda". Global New Light of Myanmar. Archived from the original on July 3, 2017.
- Maha Sithu (2012) [1798]. Kyaw Win; Thein Hlaing (eds.). Yazawin Thit (in Burmese). Vol. 1–3 (2nd ed.). Yangon: Ya-Pyei Publishing.
- Moore, Elizabeth H.; Win Maung (Tampawaddy) (June 2016). "The Social Dynamics of Pagoda Repair in Upper Myanmar". Journal of Burma Studies. 20 (1). NUS Press: 149–198. doi:10.1353/jbs.2016.0006. S2CID 148063193.
- Royal Historical Commission of Burma (2003) [1832]. Hmannan Yazawin (in Burmese). Vol. 1–3. Yangon: Ministry of Information, Myanmar.
