= Lower Paunglaung Dam =

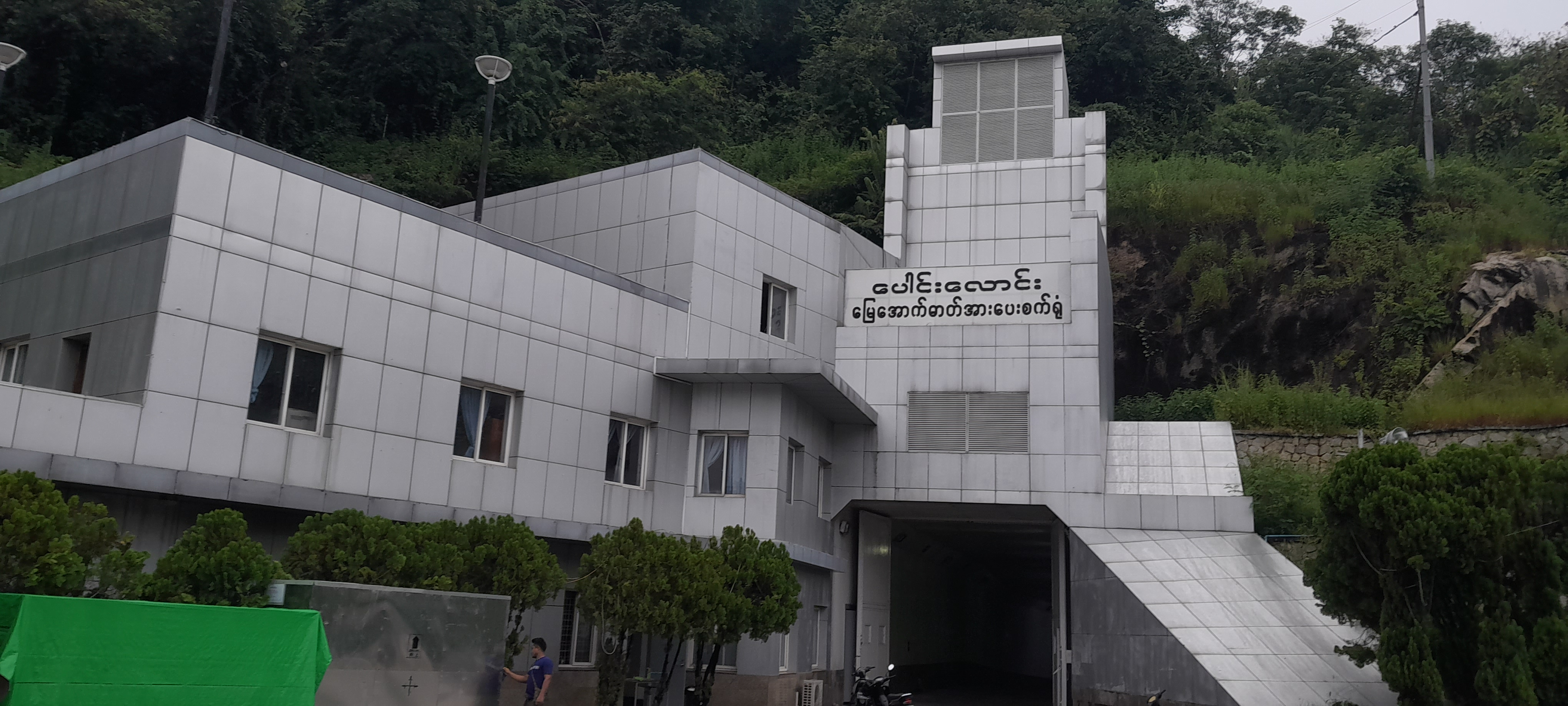

- Location within Myanmar
- Country: Burma
- Location: Pyinmana, Zeyarthiri Township, Naypyidaw Union Territory
- Coordinates: 19°47′11.20″N 096°20′09.00″E
- Purpose: Power
- Status: Operational
- Construction began: 1996
- Opening date: 2005
- Construction cost: US$201.8 million
- Owner: Ministry of Electric Power

Dam and spillways
- Type of dam: Embankment, rock-fill
- Impounds: Paunglaung River
- Height: 131 m (430 ft)
- Length: 945 m (3,100 ft)
- Spillway type: Uncontrolled, stepped chute

Reservoir
- Total capacity: 690×10^{6} m^{3} (560,000 acre⋅ft)

Power Station
- Commission date: 2004-2005
- Hydraulic head: 103.6 m (340 ft)
- Turbines: 4 x 70 MW (94,000 hp) Francis-type
- Installed capacity: 280 MW (380,000 hp)

The Lower Paunglaung Dam is a rock-fill embankment dam on the Paunglaung River, about 14 kilometres (8.7 mi) east of Pyinmana in Naypyidaw Union Territory, Myanmar. The primary purpose of the dam is hydroelectric power generation and it had been under study since 1953. Construction began in 1996 and the first generators were commissioned in 2004 and the last in 2005. The cost of the dam and the power station, funded by the Chinese government, was US$201.8 million. The dam's powerhouse is located underground near the toe and spillway. It contains four 70 megawatts (94,000 hp) Francis turbine-generators. The Upper Paunglaung Dam, being constructed upstream, is expected to regulate the river and improve power generation.

== See also ==
- Dams in Burma
- List of power stations in Burma
