= Upper Paunglaung Dam =

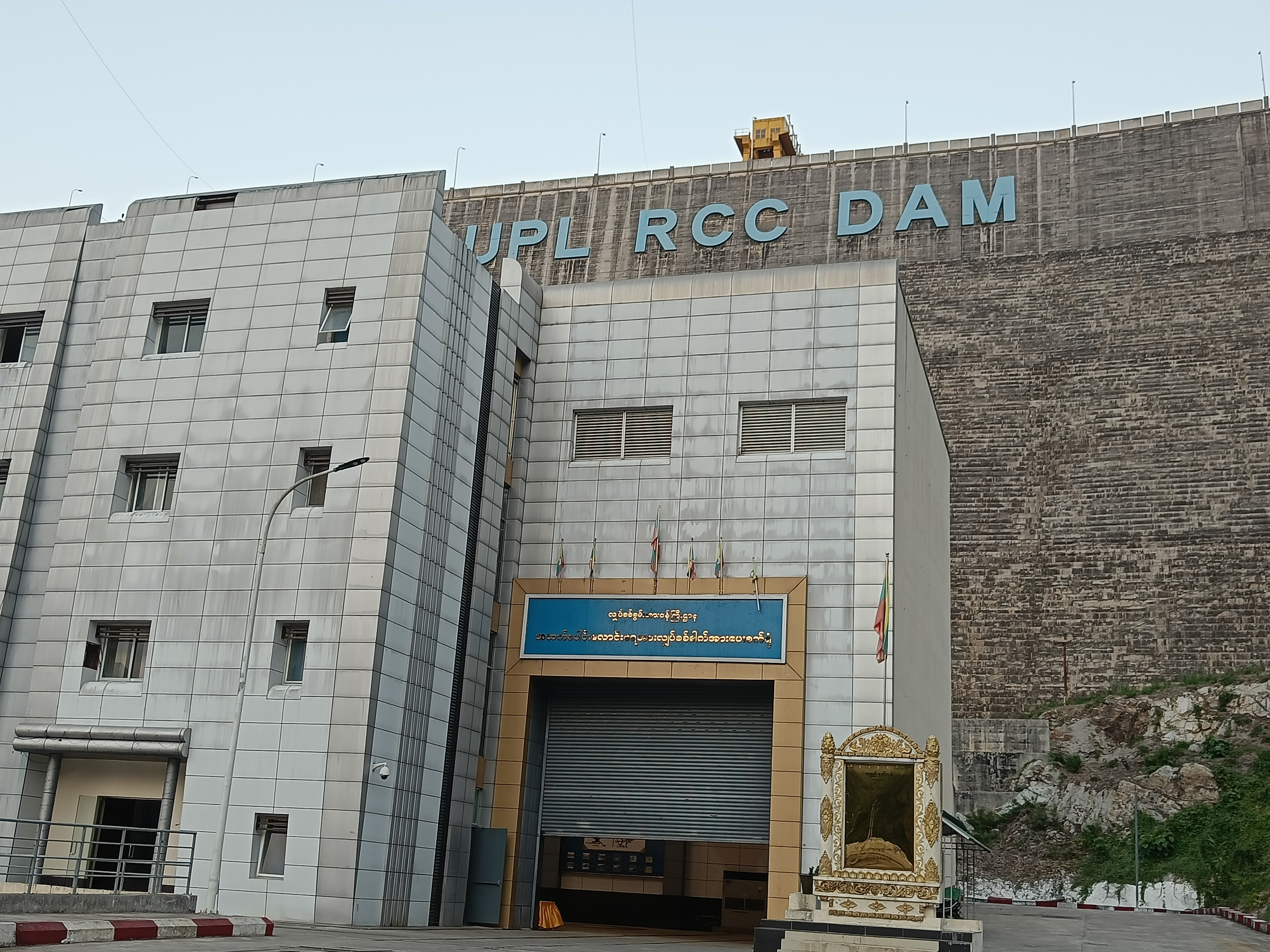

- Location within Myanmar
- Country: Burma
- Location: Naypyidaw Union Territory/Shan State
- Coordinates: 19°45′22.42″N 096°35′37.81″E
- Purpose: Power
- Status: Operational
- Construction began: 2005
- Opening date: 2015
- Owner: Ministry of Electric Power

Dam and spillways
- Type of dam: Gravity, roller-compacted concrete
- Impounds: Paunglaung River
- Height: 103 m (338 ft)
- Length: 530 m (1,740 ft)
- Dam volume: 1.1×10^{6} m^{3} (1,400,000 cu yd)
- Spillway type: Uncontrolled

Reservoir
- Total capacity: 1,300×10^{6} m^{3} (1,100,000 acre⋅ft)

Power Station
- Commission date: December 2015
- Turbines: 2 x 70 MW (94,000 hp) Francis-type
- Installed capacity: 140 MW (190,000 hp)

The Upper Paunglaung Dam is a gravity dam on the Paunglaung River, about 40 km (25 mi) east of Pyinmana on the border of Naypyidaw Union Territory and Shan State, Myanmar (Burma). The primary purpose of the dam is hydroelectric power generation, provided by the140 megawatts (190,000 hp) power station it supports. Preliminary construction on the dam site began in January 2005 and roller-compacted concrete placement for the dam commenced in October 2010. The dam was completed and impounded its reservoir in december 2015. It is expected to regulate the river and improve power generation at the downstream Lower Paunglaung Dam.

The dam forced the relocation of some 15,000 residents which has drawn backlash from locals to international organizations. Many have already relocated but complain that their new land is of an insufficient size, has no power supply or natural resources to work.

AF-Consult Switzerland Ltd was the Owner's Designer for all project phases, including commissioning.

== See also ==
- Dams in Burma
- List of power stations in Burma
