= Uppatasanti Pagoda =

Buddhist Pagoda in Naypyidaw, Myanmar

Uppātasanti Pagoda ဥပ္ပါတသန္တိစေတီတော်

- Location within Myanmar

Religion
- Affiliation: Buddhism
- Sect: Theravada Buddhism

Location
- Location: Naypyidaw
- Country: Myanmar
- Coordinates: 19°46′16.14″N 96°10′58.76″E

Architecture
- Founder: State Peace and Development Council
- Completed: March 2009

Thai delegation led by PM Abhisit Vejjajiva circumambulates Uppatasanti Pagoda

Uppātasanti Pagoda (ဥပ္ပါတသန္တိစေတီတော်, pronounced [ʔoʊʔpàta̰ θàɰ̃dḭ zèdìdɔ̀]; officially called ဥပ္ပါတသန္တိစေတီတော်မြတ်ကြီး, also called the "Peace Pagoda") is a prominent landmark in Naypyidaw, the capital of Myanmar. The pagoda houses a Buddha tooth relic. With a height of 99 metres (325 ft), it is a nearly same-sized replica of Shwedagon Pagoda in Yangon.

== History ==
Construction of Uppatasanti Pagoda began on 12 November 2006 and was completed in March 2009, under the guidance of Than Shwe, head of Myanmar’s ruling Tatmadaw Government. The invitation card for the stake-driving ceremony opened with a phrase "Rājaṭhānī Naypyidaw" (the royal capital). The name "Uppātasanti" roughly translates to "protection against calamity". It is the name of a sutra prepared by Tilokaraj, a 15th century king of the Lanna Kingdom. It is to be recited in time of crisis, especially in the face of foreign invasion.

On 4 March 2009, 20 people died during a ferris wheel accident at a festival marking the pagoda's consecration. The consecration of the pagoda, which involved the hoisting of the htidaw (sacred umbrella, ထီးတော် [tʰí dɔ̀]) and the seinbudaw (diamond lotus bud, စိန်ဖူးတော် [sèɪɰ̃ bú dɔ̀]), took place on 10 March 2009.

== Structure ==
The pagoda is 30 centimetres (12 in) shorter than the Shwedagon Pagoda. The massive base of the pagoda which may be mistaken for a large hill is completely man-made. The pagoda precinct also comprises:

- Maha Hsutaungpyae Buddha Image in Maha Pasadabhumi Gandhakuṭi Chamber
- Four jade Buddha images in the pagoda's hollow cave
- 108 feet high tagundaing (flagstaff)
- Bodhi tree Garden with Maha Bo Tree and the images of the 28 Buddhas
- Garden of 108 bodhi trees
- Mālinī Maṅgala Lake with the chamber of Shin Upagutta
- Withongama Ordination Hall (thein)
- Cetiyapala Chamber
- Sangha Yama hostels
- Sasana Maha Beikmandaw Building
- Pagoda museum
- Pitakat Building and Religious Archive

=== Captive white elephants ===
Seven captive white elephants are kept at the pagoda grounds, under the custody of the Ministry of Natural Resources and Environmental Conservation's Forest Department. They are kept in inhumane conditions, shackled for 22 hours a day and housed in small open-air pavilions.

== Gallery ==
Closeup of the pagoda's hti

Inside the dome

View from a corner

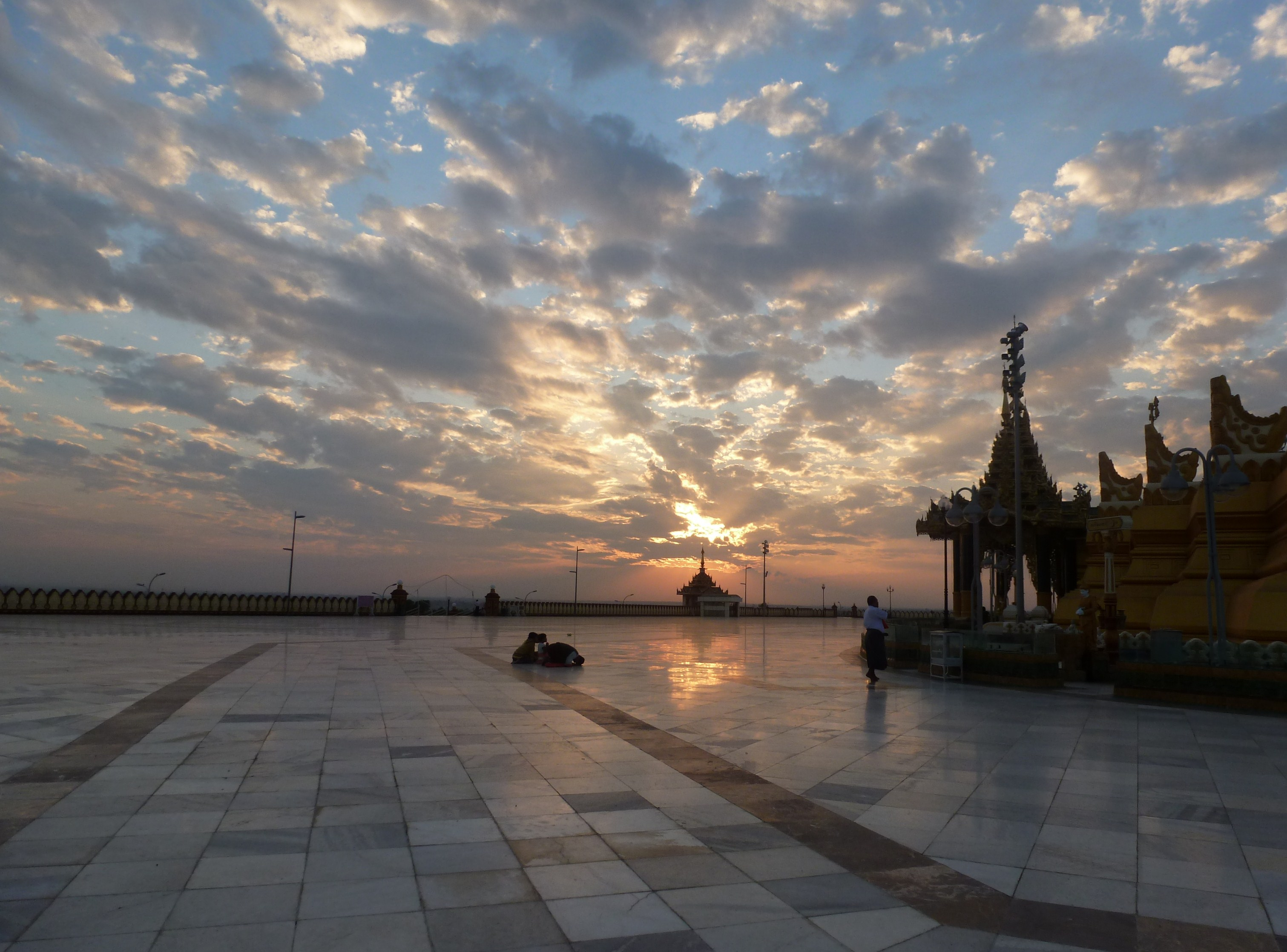
Plaza at sunset

A shrine off the main plaza

Main plaza looking east

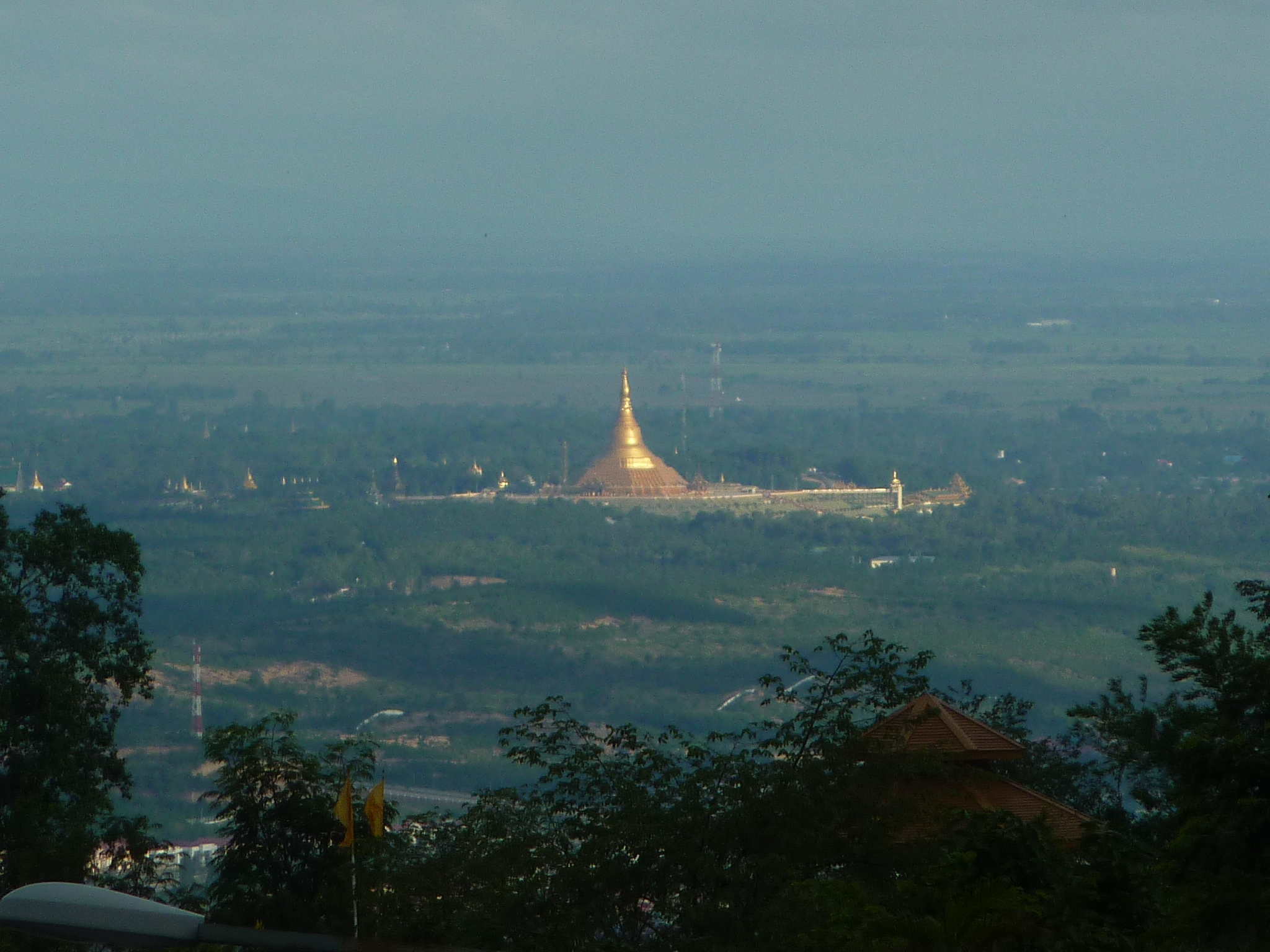
The pagoda from a distance

Twilight image of pagoda

Pagoda at night
