= Hti =

Architectural element

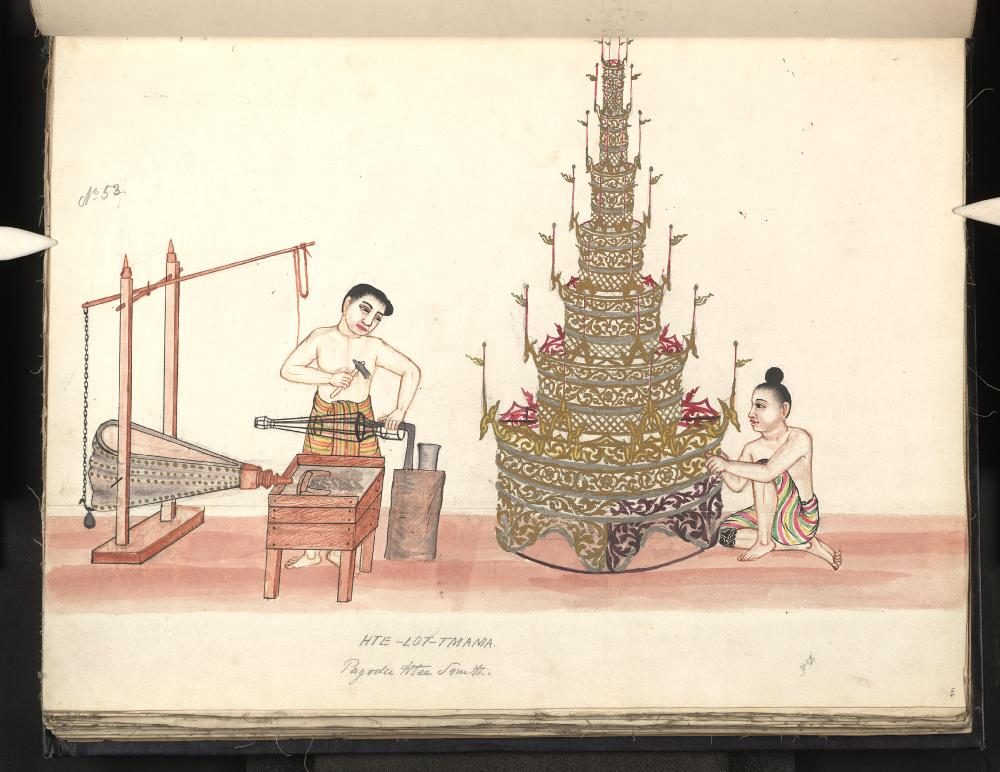
Depiction of hti craftsmen, 1897.

Hti (Burmese: ထီး, MLCTS: hti:, IPA: [tʰí]; Mon: ဍိုၚ် [daŋ]; Shan: ထီး [tʰi˦]), a Burmese language word meaning umbrella, is the name of the finial ornament that tops almost all Burmese pagodas. The chatra umbrella or parasol is an auspicious symbol in Buddhism and Hinduism.

== As regalia ==
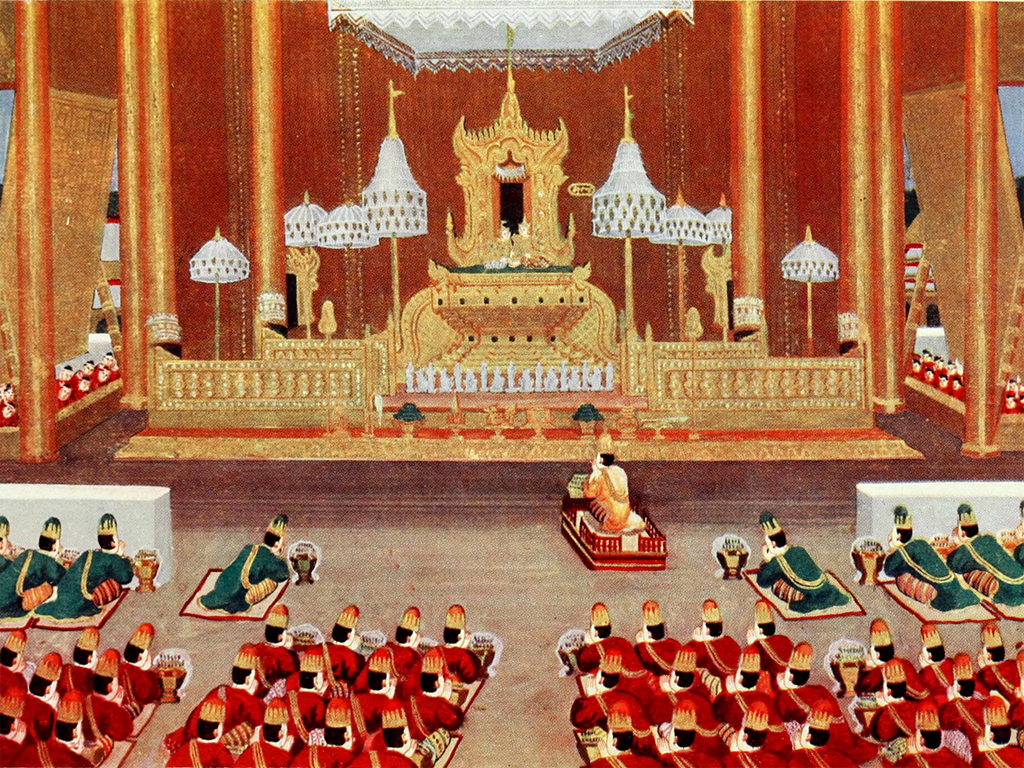
A Burmese painting depicts the white umbrellas used as regalia by the Burmese monarch on the throne.

In pre-colonial Burma, the hti was an indicator of social status and used exclusively by those who were granted express permission to do so. The royal white umbrella or hti phyu taw (ထီးဖြူတော်) was one of the five articles of coronation regalia (မင်းမြောက်တန်ဆာ, Min Mhyauk Tanza).

Use and possession of a royal white umbrella was limited exclusively to the Burmese king and his chief queen, while the highest officials (wun, ဝန်) and royal princes (including the Crown Prince or Uparaja) possessed golden umbrellas and lower-level officials possessed red umbrellas, if any.

The royal white umbrella was a sign of sovereignty. Indeed, use of a white umbrella by any person other than the king and his chief queen was regarded as a declaration of rebellion, punishable with immediate execution. At the death of the king, the royal white umbrellas in his possession were broken. The white umbrella was also permitted for religious usage. For instance, The Mahamuni Buddha was formerly shaded by a white umbrella.

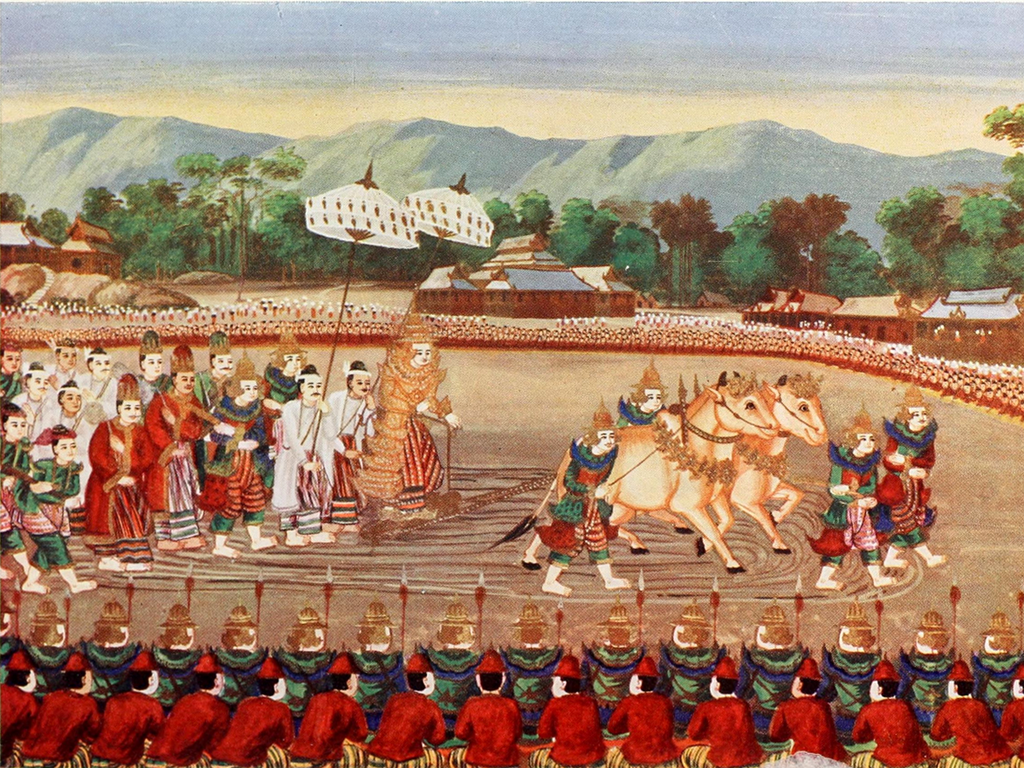
A Burmese painting depicts a monarch shielded with a white umbrella during the Royal Ploughing Ceremony.

The umbrellas were embellished inside and out with pictures of sylphs and fairies in gold, thin gold plates shaped like banyan leaves fastened to the top, and handles of gold adorned with pearls, diamonds, rubies, emeralds, corals and with spangles. The umbrella used by the king when riding an elephant or travelling by carriage was called a yin hti.

The number of umbrellas in one's possession was also an indication of social status, as they were showcased during public processions and put up in prominent places at home. The king was allotted nine white umbrellas, the crown prince eight golden ones, distinguished statesmen and military generals several golden ones, and the other royal personages had numbers corresponding to achievements or the king's regard for them. The royal white elephants (hsinphyudaw, ဆင်ဖြူတော်) were also granted six umbrellas, 2 white and 4 golden.

The Shwepon Nidan, a treatise on palace matters, describes 11 types of royal umbrellas and corresponding spirit maidens (nat thami, နတ်သ္မီး) who guarded them:

1. Kanekkedan Hti - stood beside the king's throne
2. Thamoddarit Hti
3. Thamoddana Hti
4. Sandar Hti
5. Thuriya Hti
6. Paduma Hti
7. Thamokkha Hti
8. Withagyun Hti
9. Kambu Hti
10. Uyu Hti
11. Thamuti Hti

=== Pathein hti ===
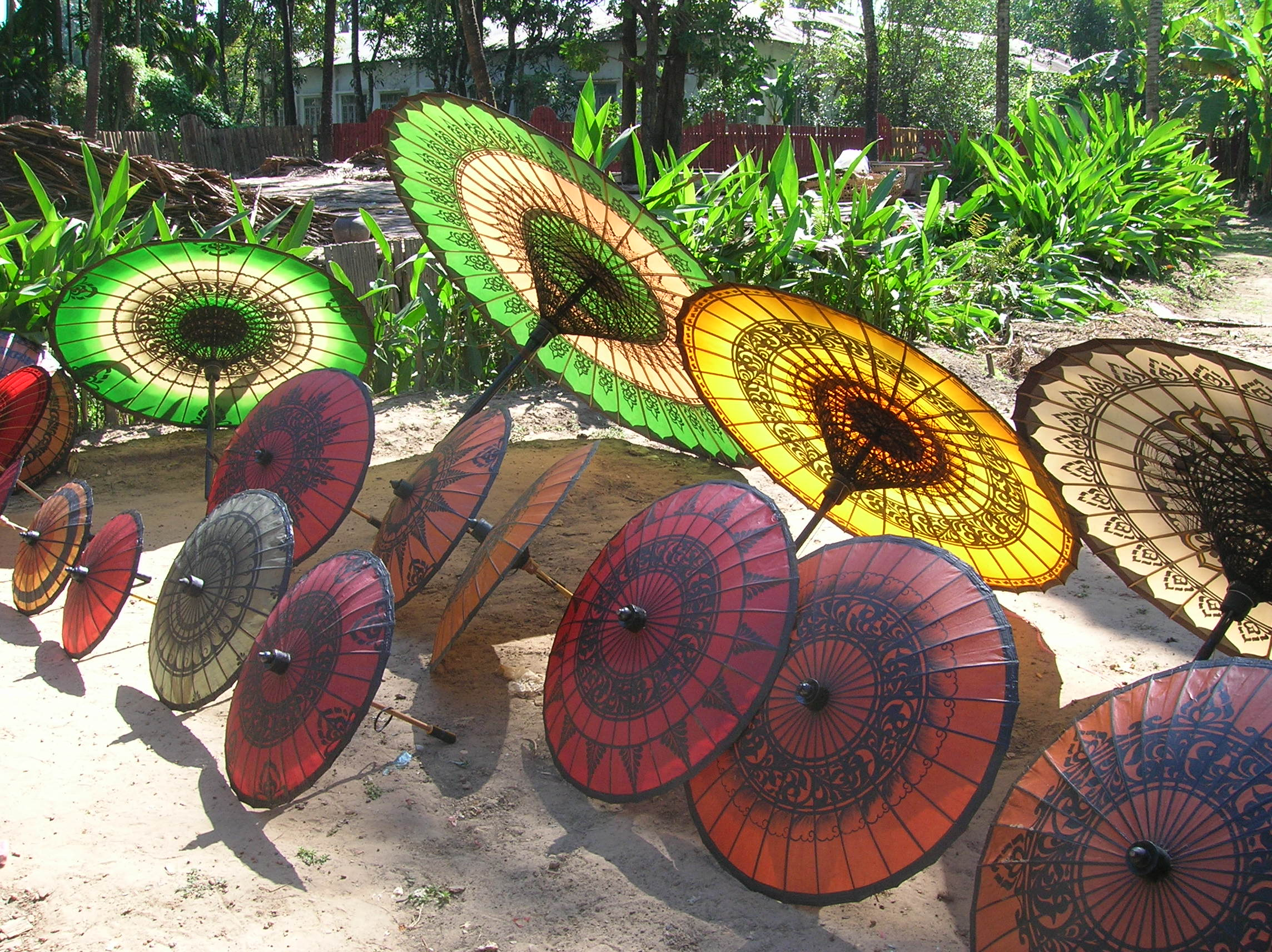
The Pathein hti is an iconic umbrella originating from the Irrawaddy delta town of Pathein.

The Irrawaddy delta town of Pathein (formerly Bassein) in Lower Myanmar is renowned for its colorful cotton umbrellas, which are dubbed "Pathein umbrellas" or "Pathein parasols" (ပုသိမ်ထီး), which are traditionally made in home workshops.

== In pagodas ==
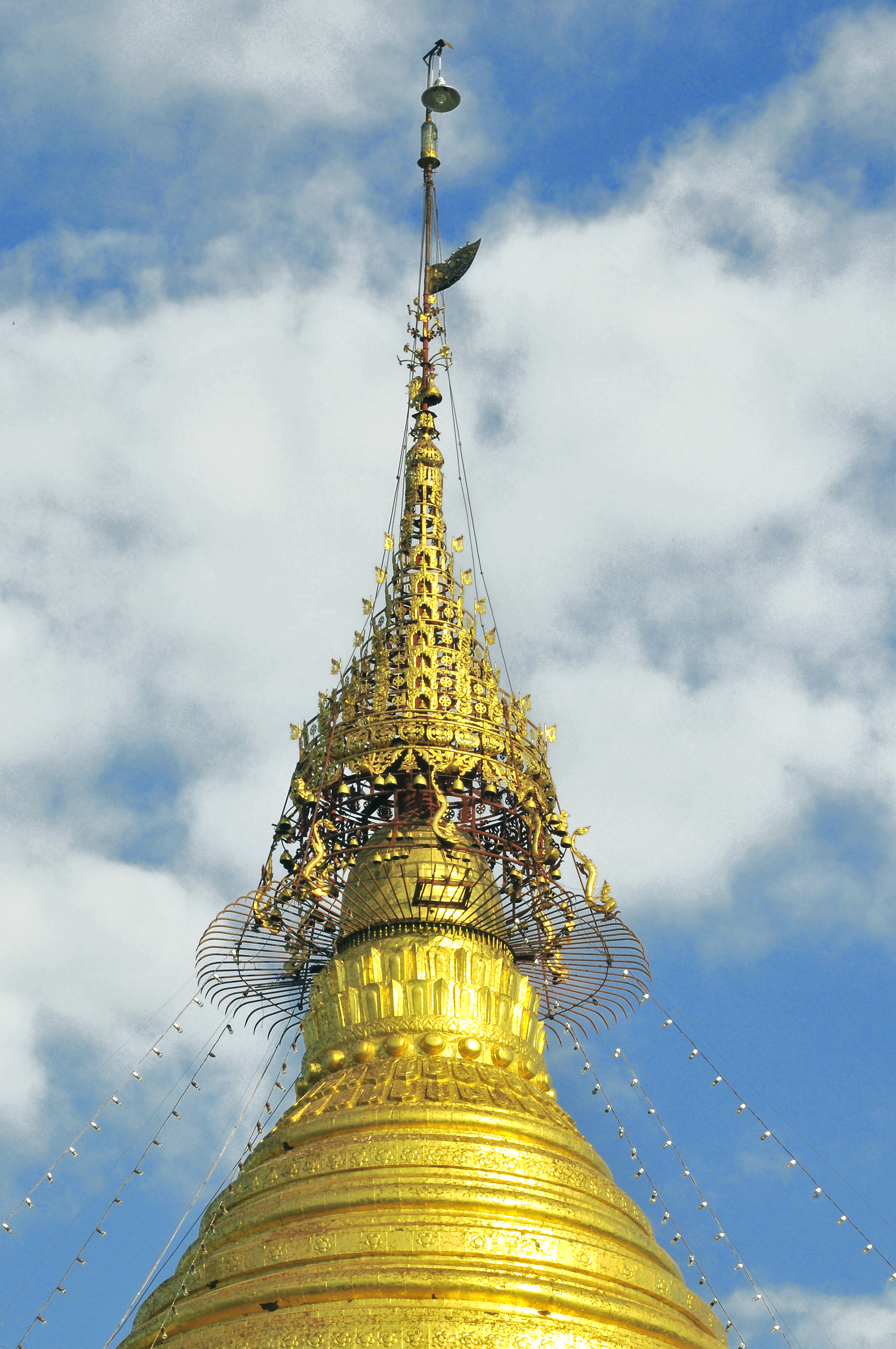
The hti of Kuthodaw Pagoda in Mandalay.

The hti can be said as the main distinctive feature of Burmese pagodas, as they are more prominent than their Sri Lankan counterparts, while the Laotian and Thai pagodas do not have any. The tip of the hti, which is studded with precious stones, is called the seinhpudaw (စိန်ဖူးတော်; lit. "esteemed diamond bud"). Hti have been found on pagodas constructed by all four of the pagoda building ethnic groups of Myanmar: the Mon, the Bamar (Burmans), the Rakhine (Arakanese) and the Shan.

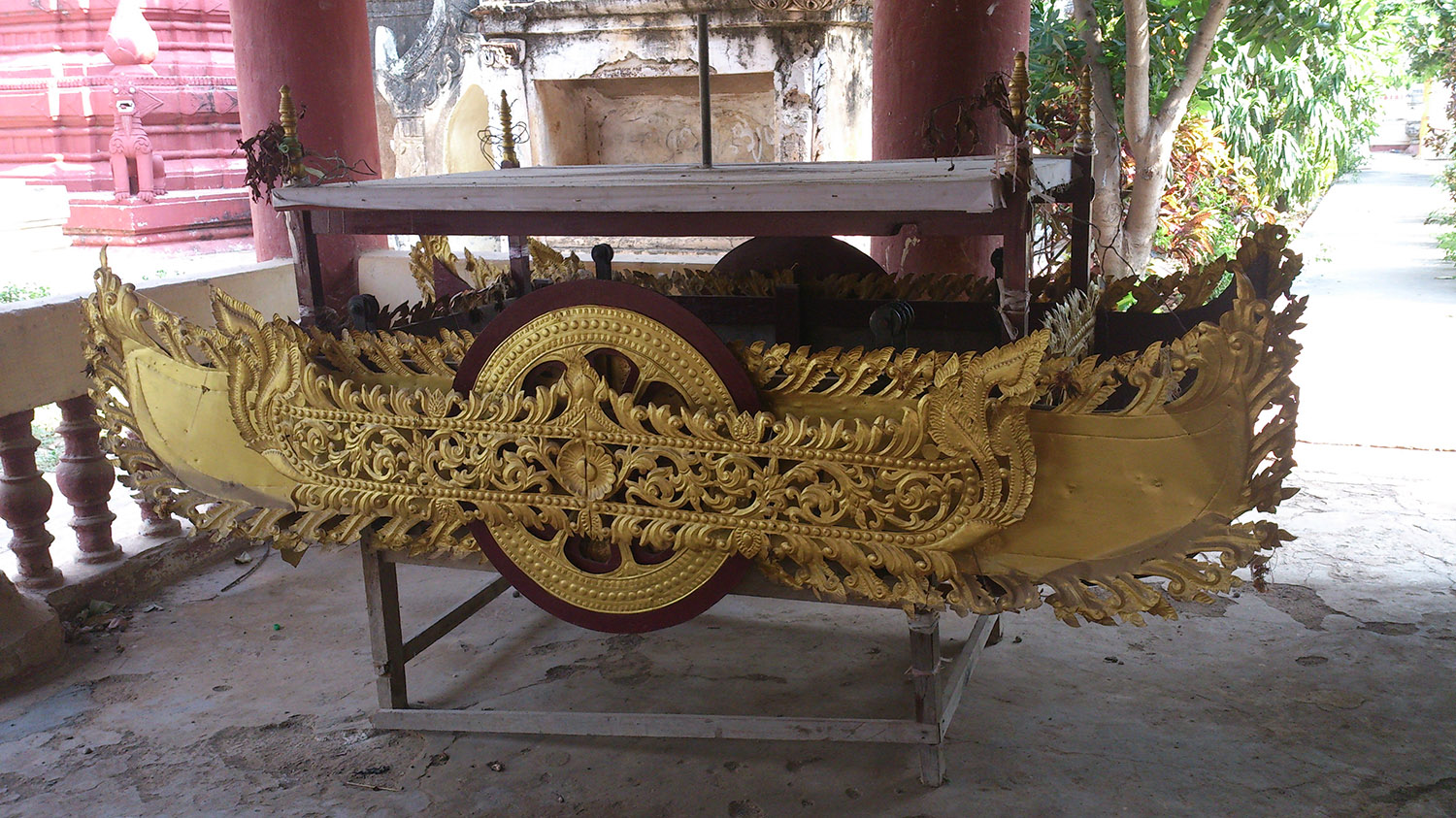
A ceremonial cart (နတ်ရထား) is used to hoist the umbrella to the pagoda's pinnacle.

The hti is considered the most important part of the pagoda. A special ceremony being held for the placing of the hti on the pagoda is called hti tin pwe (ထီးတင်ပွဲ).

The hti is placed on the top of a pagoda and hung with a multitude of bells. The hti of prominent pagodas are often made entirely of gold or silver. The bells are used to attract the attention of good spirits in Tāvatiṃsa and other abodes of the devas of Mount Meru.

=== Examples ===
The htis of the temples of Bagan and Mrauk U, the two archeological treasure troves of Myanmar, are all made of stone, while the htis of the pagodas there and elsewhere around Myanmar are made of metal (usually iron or steel), coated with gold. The hti is then decorated with golden or gold-plated brass and bronze bells (ခေါင်းလောင်း), and at jewelry donated by devotees.

The hti of the Shwedagon Pagoda in Yangon is about one and a half stories tall and contains about half a ton of gold. The hti belongs to the magaik form, and is set with over 5,500 diamonds, 2,300 rubies, sapphires and other gems, and 4,000 golden bells. The older hti, donated by the penultimate King of Burma, Mindon Min, can be seen at a temple inside the middle platform (အလယ်ပစ္စယ or ရင်ပြင်တော်) of the pagoda's compound. Said hti at Shwedagon is a gilt iron-work umbrella, on each of whose many rings hangs multitudes of gold and silver jewelled bells. It was presented by King Mindon Min and placed at a cost of not less than 50,000 British pounds. It was constructed by voluntary labor, using donated money and jewels. The vane and uppermost band are richly studded with jewels from all parts of Burma.

== Gallery ==
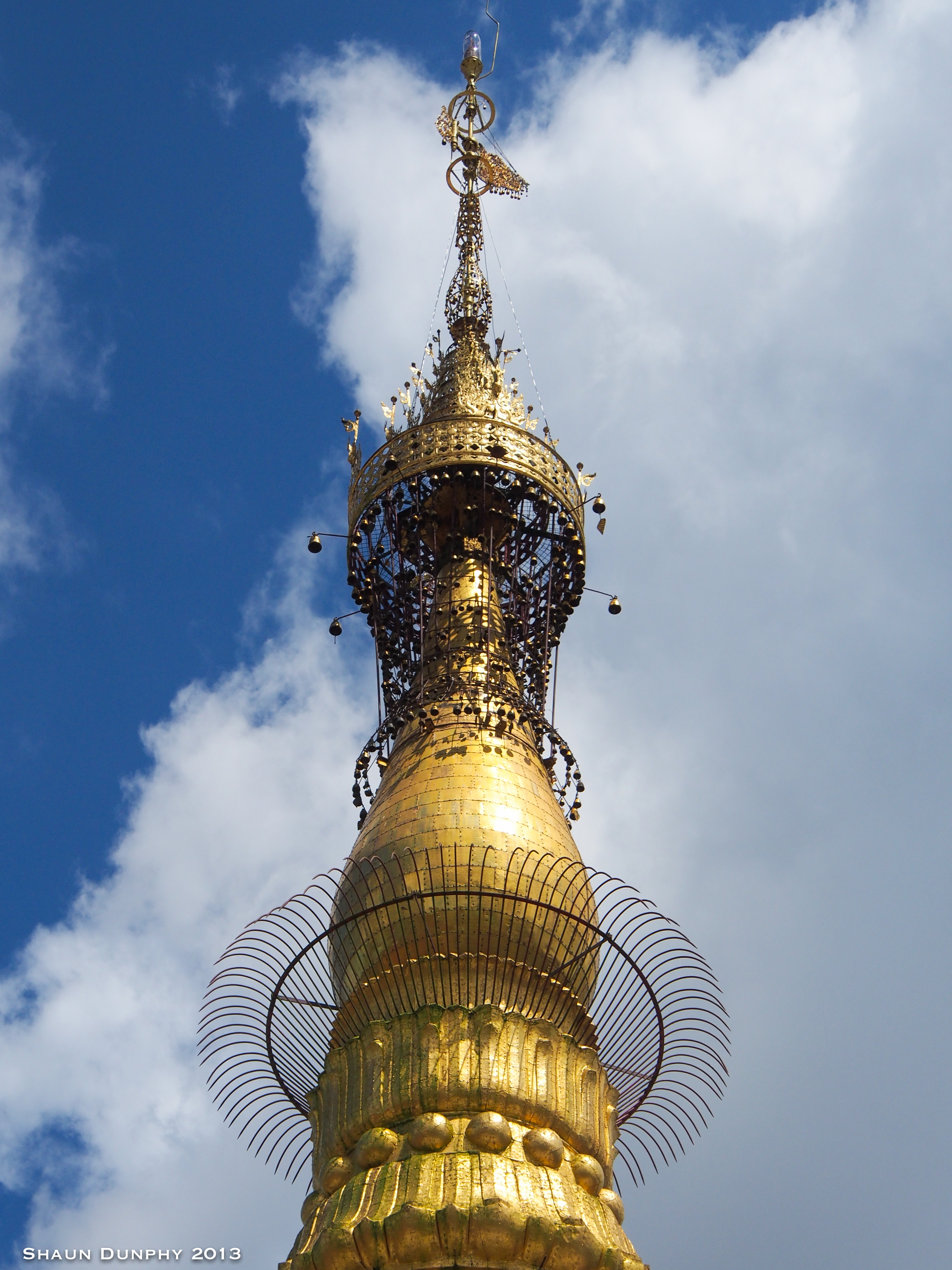
The hti of Botataung Pagoda.

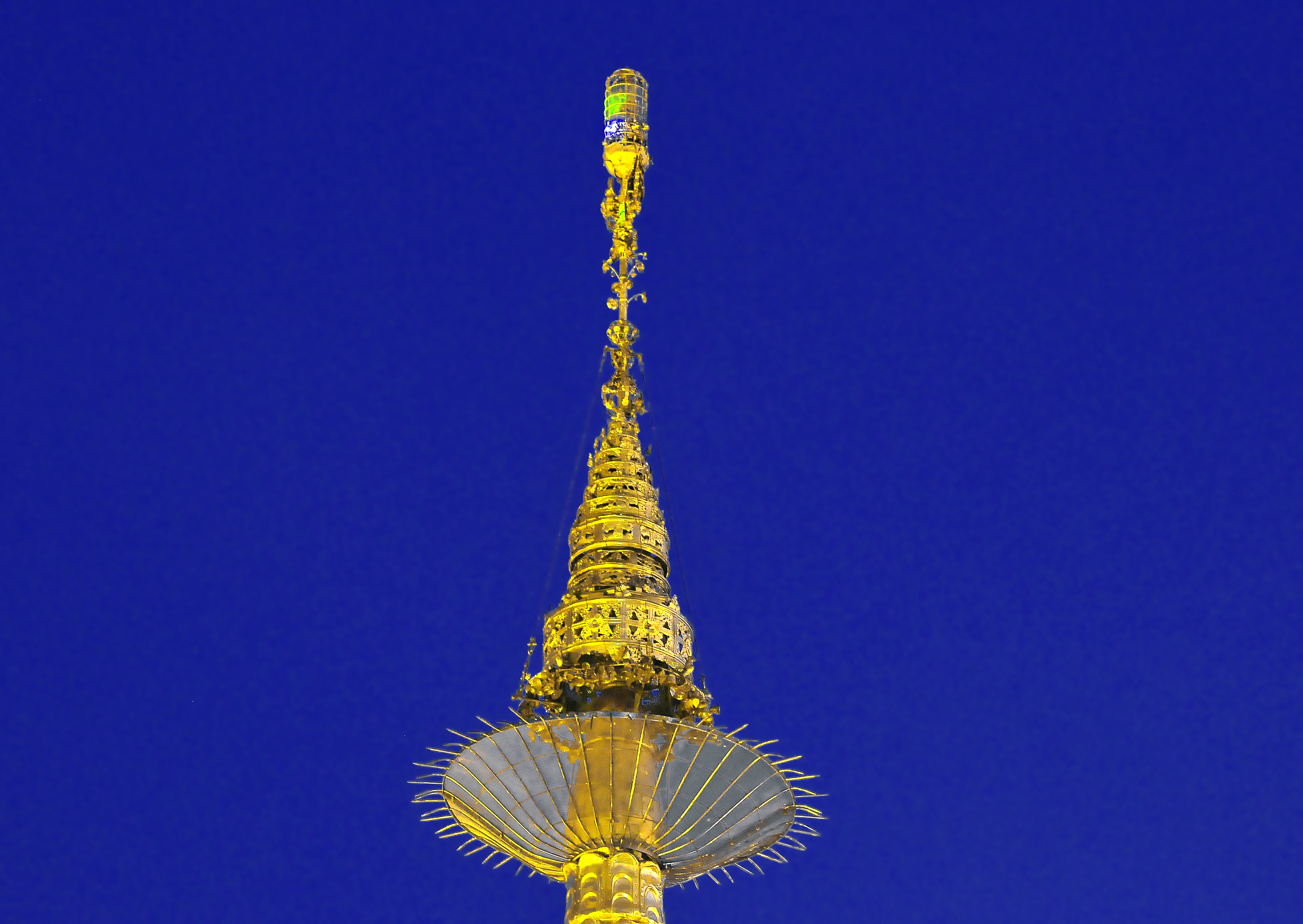
The hti of Kyaikhtiyo Pagoda.

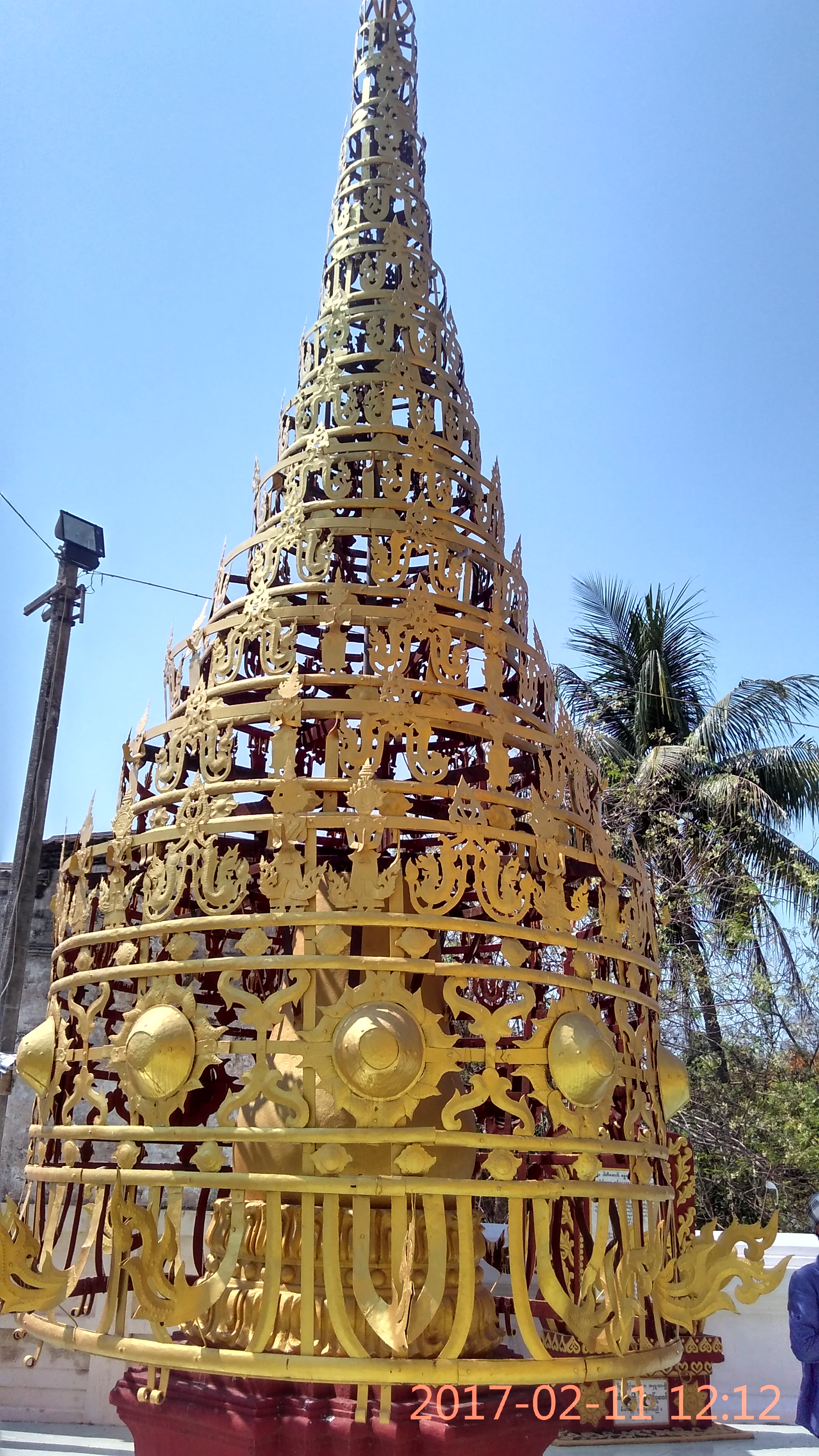
The old hti of the Myat Saw Brothers Pagoda in Taungoo.

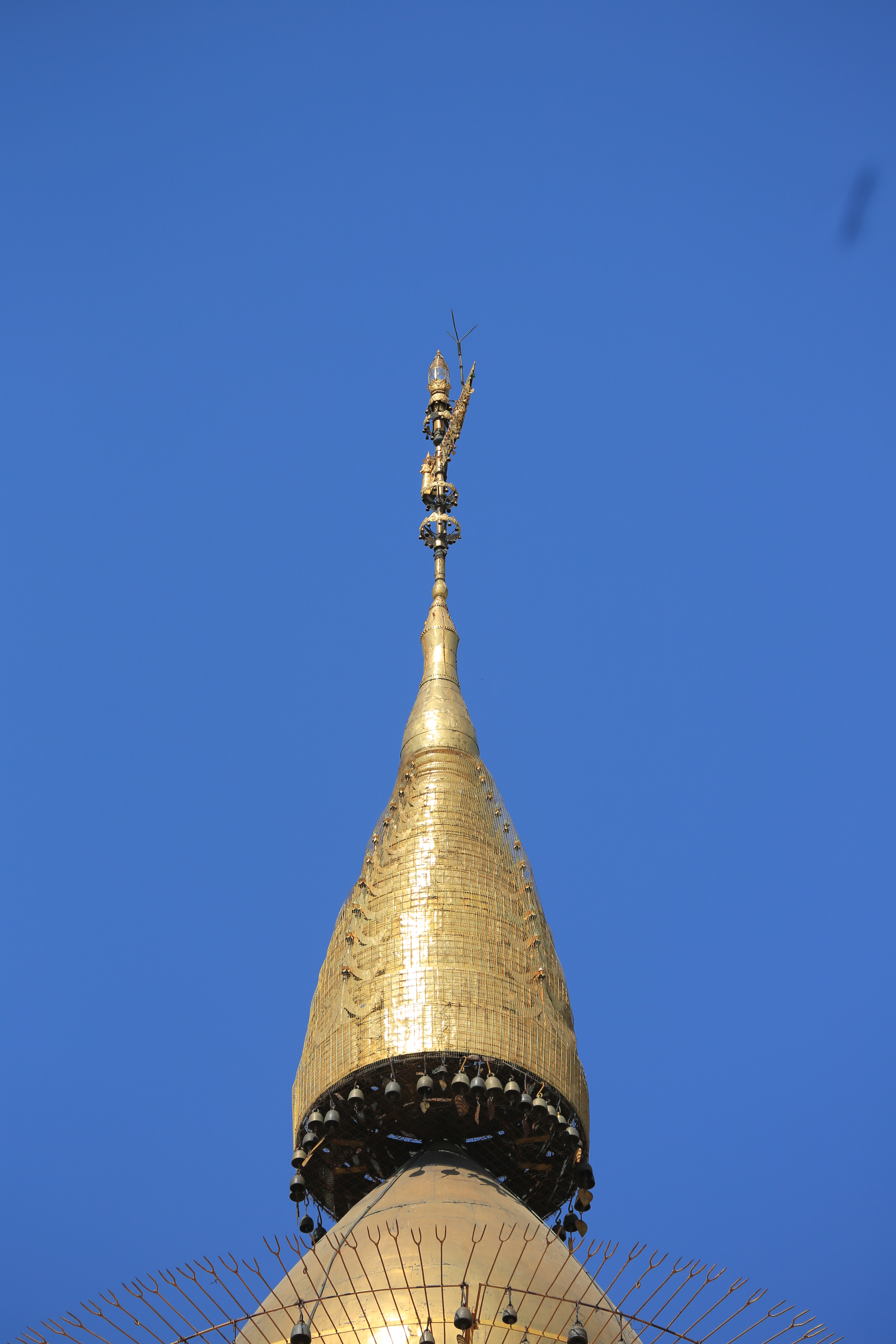
The current hti of Shwezigon Pagoda

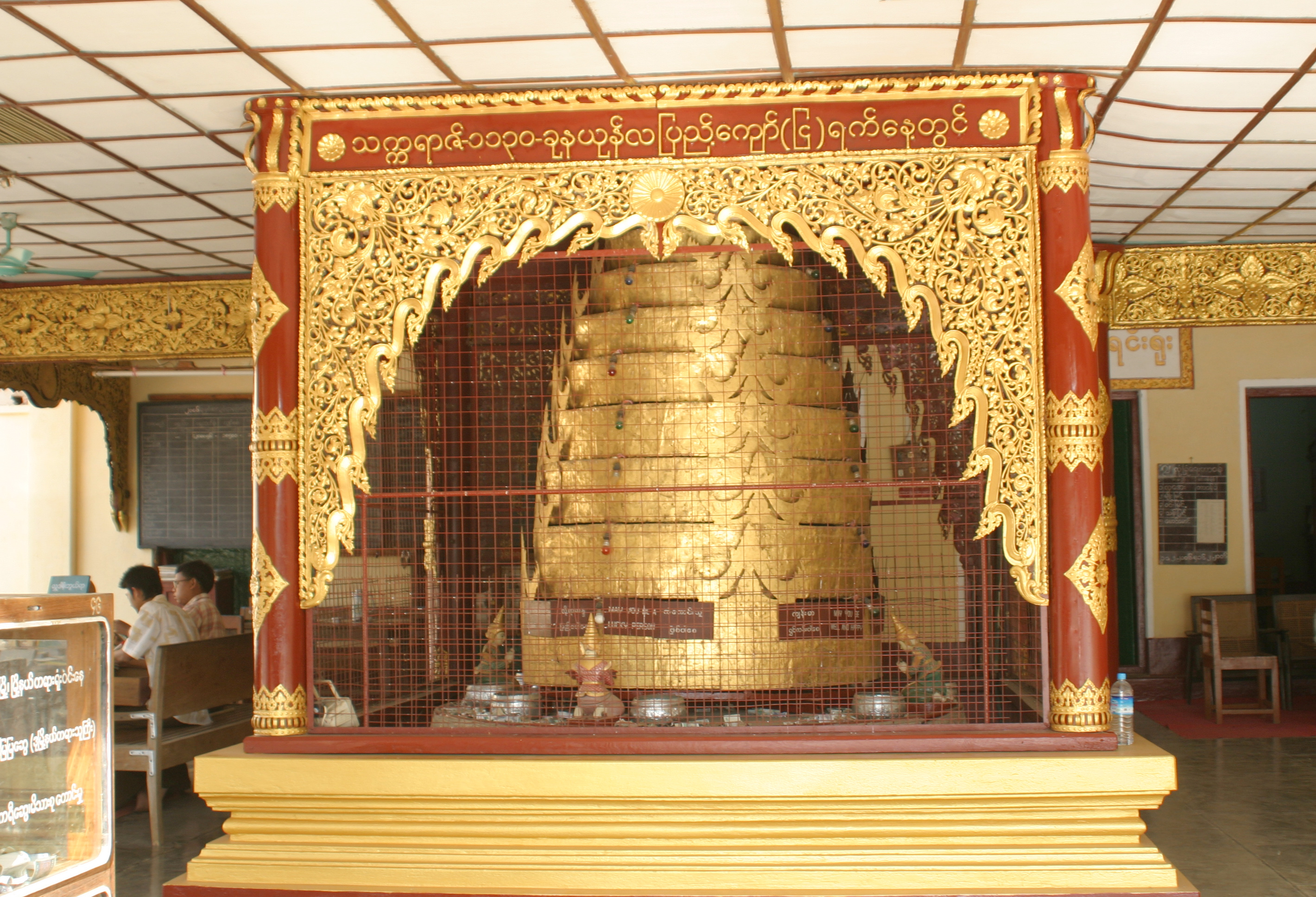
The old hti of Shwezigon Pagoda

The hti of Uppatasanti Pagoda.

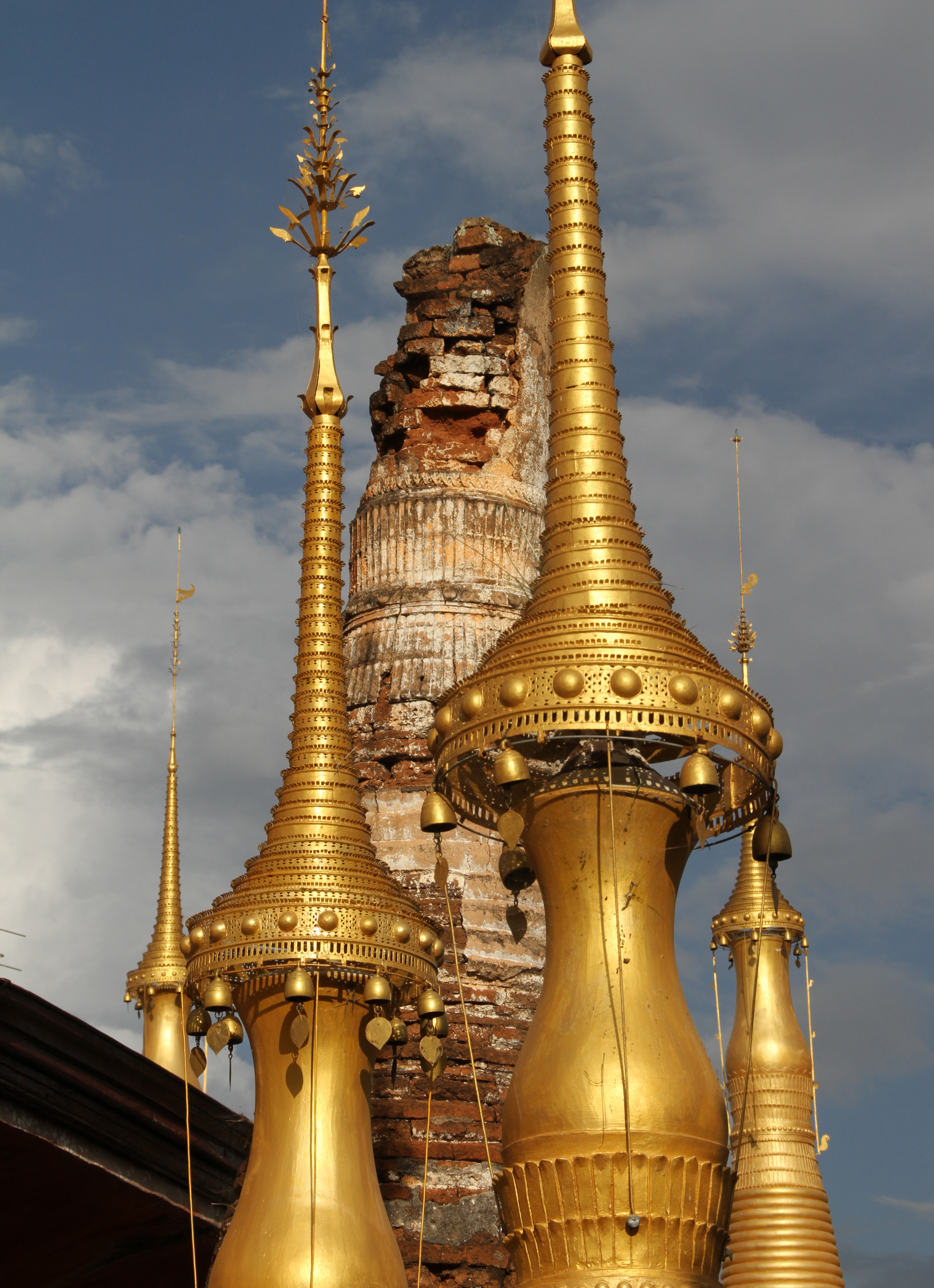
Htis of Shwe Indein Pagodas

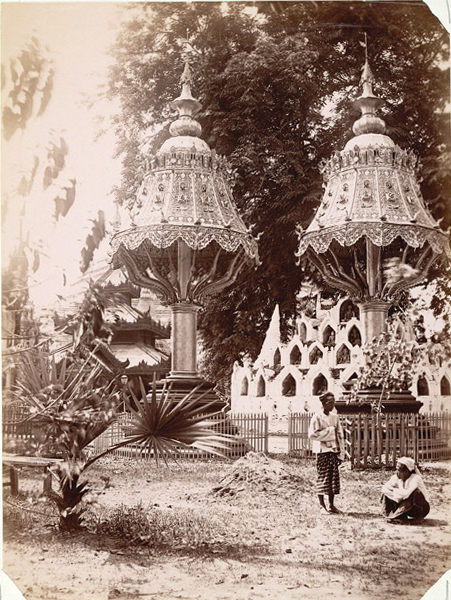
Shan-style htis

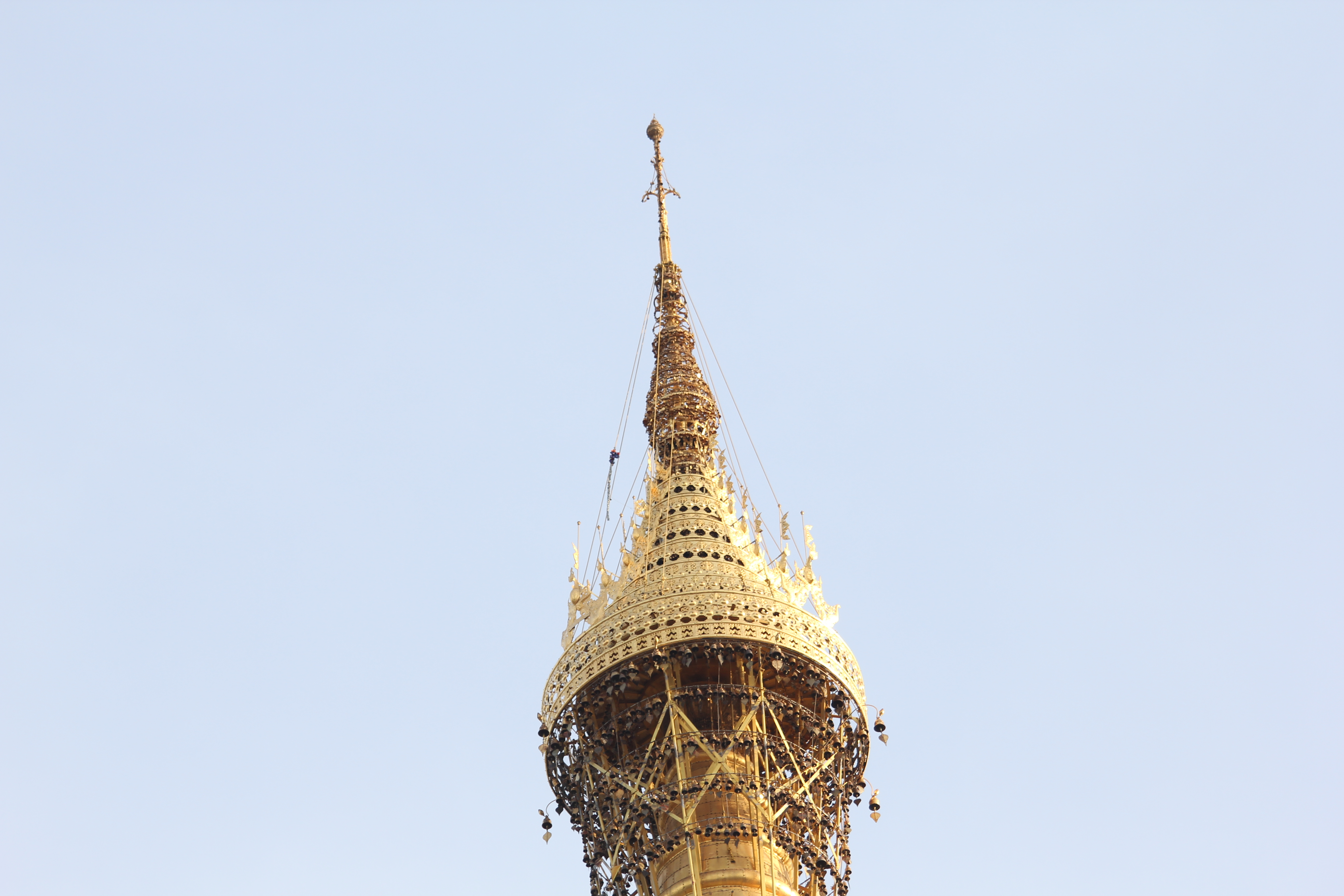
Hti of Shwedagon Pagoda

== See also ==
- Chhatra
- Royal Nine-Tiered Umbrella
