= Hulodes drylla =

Scientific classification
- Kingdom: Animalia
- Phylum: Arthropoda
- Class: Insecta
- Order: Lepidoptera
- Superfamily: Noctuoidea
- Family: Erebidae
- Genus: Hulodes
- Species: H. drylla

Binomial name
- Hulodes drylla Guenée, 1852

Species of moth

Hulodes drylla is a moth of the family Erebidae. It is found from India to Burma. The specimens of Hulodes drylla in Queensland are now considered to be Hulodes donata.

Both Hulodes saturnioides and Hulodes donata were thought to be synonyms of Hulodes drylla, but have been reinstated as species recently.
