= List of villages in Pathein Township =

This is a list of villages in Pathein Township, Pathein District, Ayeyarwady Region, Burma (Myanmar).

Village	Village code	Village tract	Coordinates (links to map & photo sources)	Notes
Khway Thay	160189	Shan Kwin	16.9021°N 94.6404°E	
Ohn Taw	160188	Shan Kwin	16.9091°N 94.6539°E	
Thar Paung Lay	160187	Shan Kwin	16.9147°N 94.641°E	
Taung Ka Lay	160186	Shan Kwin	16.8956°N 94.6463°E	
Kyar Ni Kan	160185	Shan Kwin		
Shan Kwin	160184	Shan Kwin	16.8974°N 94.6549°E	
Oe Bo Kone	160306	Shaw Pyar	16.9284°N 94.6765°E	
Kin Pun Chin	160312	Shaw Pyar		
Kyauk Ku Tin	160311	Shaw Pyar		
Ka Law Kone	160310	Shaw Pyar	16.9368°N 94.602°E	
War Yar	160309	Shaw Pyar	16.9265°N 94.6126°E	
Hlay Lone Taung	160307	Shaw Pyar	16.9209°N 94.6494°E	
War Boe	160308	Shaw Pyar	16.9297°N 94.6179°E	
Ka Lat Chi	160302	Shaw Pyar	16.9075°N 94.6559°E	
Auk Ka Lat Chi	160303	Shaw Pyar	16.9127°N 94.6569°E	
Htein Taw	160304	Shaw Pyar	16.9337°N 94.6729°E	
U Yin Chaung	160305	Shaw Pyar	16.9215°N 94.6462°E	
Shaw Pyar	160301	Shaw Pyar	16.9183°N 94.6514°E	
Let Khoke	163816	Ywar Thit	16.8703°N 94.7307°E	
Kone Thar Yar	163819	Ywar Thit	16.8669°N 94.7223°E	
Nyaung Kone	163817	Ywar Thit		
Kwin Pauk	163815	Ywar Thit	16.8487°N 94.7323°E	
Ywar Thit	163814	Ywar Thit	16.8742°N 94.7314°E	
Htan Kone (Taung Tan Kone)	163818	Ywar Thit	16.8616°N 94.7236°E	
San Pya	152590	Htan Kant Lant		
Yae Kyaw	152589	Htan Kant Lant	16.8855°N 94.6732°E	
Wea Gyi	152588	Htan Kant Lant	16.8862°N 94.6915°E	
Htan Taw Gyi	152587	Htan Kant Lant	16.8805°N 94.6928°E	
Zee Kone	152586	Htan Kant Lant	16.8711°N 94.6974°E	
Ah Su Gyi	152585	Htan Kant Lant	16.8498°N 94.6992°E	
Htan Kant Lant	152584	Htan Kant Lant	16.8579°N 94.7029°E	
Set Kone	155314	Kyauk Chaung Gyi	16.8882°N 94.7064°E	
Tha Yet Taw	155317	Kyauk Chaung Gyi	16.8803°N 94.6976°E	
Zee Kone	155315	Kyauk Chaung Gyi	16.8585°N 94.7088°E	
Kyauk Chaung Gyi	155313	Kyauk Chaung Gyi	16.8891°N 94.7213°E	
Kyar Kan Taunt	155316	Kyauk Chaung Gyi	16.8718°N 94.7011°E	
Maung Bi Wa	157669	Min Kone	16.8889°N 94.6955°E	
Pi Tauk Pin	157668	Min Kone	16.9023°N 94.6774°E	
Min Kone Lay	157667	Min Kone	16.8929°N 94.6886°E	
Min Kone Gyi	157666	Min Kone	16.8981°N 94.681°E	
Tha Yet Cho Kone	150221	Ah Nan Kone	16.8662°N 94.6664°E	
Bu Inn	150225	Ah Nan Kone	16.8646°N 94.6491°E	
Kan Par Ni	150224	Ah Nan Kone	16.8612°N 94.6572°E	
Tha Yet Kone	150222	Ah Nan Kone	16.8496°N 94.664°E	
Ah Nan Kone	150220	Ah Nan Kone	16.8716°N 94.6706°E	
Gway Tauk Chaung	150223	Ah Nan Kone	16.838°N 94.6782°E	
Hle Kyaw Kone	153933	Kan Ni	16.8218°N 94.7212°E	
Kan Ni Hpyar	153934	Kan Ni	16.8309°N 94.7106°E	
Thu Taw Kone	153935	Kan Ni	16.8213°N 94.7047°E	
Kan Ni	153932	Kan Ni	16.8294°N 94.7273°E	
Kyaung Pan Kone	155400	Kyaung Pan Kone	16.8439°N 94.716°E	
Za Yat Seik	155401	Kyaung Pan Kone	16.833°N 94.6721°E	
Lin Win Gyi	156987	Lin Win Gyi	16.7544°N 94.683°E	
Pi Tauk Chaung Kone	156994	Lin Win Gyi	16.7742°N 94.6998°E	
Kwet Pyin Gyi	156993	Lin Win Gyi		
Yae Thoe Kone	156992	Lin Win Gyi	16.7666°N 94.6954°E	
Kyein Ni Kone	156991	Lin Win Gyi	16.7745°N 94.6877°E	
Nan Hmyar Kone	156990	Lin Win Gyi		
Htein Chaung	156988	Lin Win Gyi	16.7581°N 94.6709°E	
Yae Kyaw Wa	156989	Lin Win Gyi	16.7785°N 94.7228°E	
Kwin Pauk Gyi	154938	Kwin Pauk Gyi	16.8006°N 94.6774°E	
Ein Chaung Lay	154939	Kwin Pauk Gyi	16.8006°N 94.6806°E	
Pan Pin Seik	159060	Pan Pin Seik	16.6614°N 94.6566°E	
Gwa Chaung	159061	Pan Pin Seik	16.6544°N 94.6576°E	
Gway Kone	151765	Gway Kone	16.6446°N 94.7222°E	
Wea Daunt	151766	Gway Kone	16.6492°N 94.7098°E	
Se Pin Lay	163349	Yae Ma Nay Pin Kaing	16.7365°N 94.682°E	
Se Pin Gyi	163348	Yae Ma Nay Pin Kaing	16.7269°N 94.6826°E	
Yae Kyaw Wa	163347	Yae Ma Nay Pin Kaing	16.7519238°N 94.6877674°E	
Kha Ya Ngu	163346	Yae Ma Nay Pin Kaing	16.744°N 94.6868°E	
Ta Laing Chaung	163345	Yae Ma Nay Pin Kaing	16.7265°N 94.6998°E	
Yae Ma Nay Pin Kaing	163344	Yae Ma Nay Pin Kaing	16.729°N 94.688°E	
Ma Yan Chaung	162927	U To	16.6609°N 94.6592°E	
Kwin Hlyar Lay	162926	U To	16.6947°N 94.6554°E	
U To Wa	162925	U To	16.6737°N 94.675°E	
U To Gyi	162923	U To	16.6886°N 94.6798°E	
Htein Kone Lay	162924	U To	16.7035°N 94.6762°E	
Cho To	162928	U To	16.6855°N 94.6742°E	
Hpa Yar Ni (Hpa Yar Chaung)	152248	Hpa Yar Chaung	16.7316°N 94.7175°E	
Than Pat Kone	152251	Hpa Yar Chaung	16.714°N 94.7053°E	
Kin Mun Chin	152249	Hpa Yar Chaung	16.7345°N 94.7326°E	
Ta Laing Chaung Kone	152250	Hpa Yar Chaung	16.7262°N 94.7065°E	
Tha Pyay Pin	156737	Lein Kone	16.7611°N 94.6659°E	
Lein Kone	156736	Lein Kone	16.7465°N 94.6589°E	
Htan Kone	152591	Htan Kone	16.7792°N 94.6439°E	
Ku La Ma Kone	152592	Htan Kone	16.7865°N 94.6352°E	
Wet Gyi Kwin	163159	Wet Gyi Kwin	16.7201°N 94.6444°E	
Pan Hla Kwin	163160	Wet Gyi Kwin	16.7237°N 94.6529°E	
Kyar Ni Kan	163161	Wet Gyi Kwin		
Gway Chaung	152762	Htein Lay Pin Lin Win Gyi	16.7638°N 94.6406°E	
Karen Lin Win Gyi	152759	Htein Lay Pin Lin Win Gyi	16.7821°N 94.6152°E	
Ma Yan Cho	152760	Htein Lay Pin Lin Win Gyi	16.7757°N 94.6217°E	
Pan Pin Seik	152761	Htein Lay Pin Lin Win Gyi	16.7764968°N 94.6374157°E	
Htein Tan	156818	Let Pan	16.7808°N 94.6744°E	
Oke Hpo	156819	Let Pan	16.7855°N 94.6752°E	
Let Pan	156817	Let Pan	16.7886°N 94.6584°E	
Kyet Yoe Kone	157457	Me Za Li	16.722°N 94.5879°E	
Shwe Twin Tu	157456	Me Za Li	16.6979°N 94.5906°E	
Chaung Wa	157455	Me Za Li	16.6936°N 94.5919°E	
Me Za Li	157454	Me Za Li	16.7194°N 94.5827°E	
Sar Yay Kwin	163768	Ywar Haung Gyi	16.7245°N 94.5482°E	
Rakhine Kone	163769	Ywar Haung Gyi	16.7185°N 94.5622°E	
Ywar Haung Gyi	163767	Ywar Haung Gyi	16.7287°N 94.5601°E	
Pyin Ka Toe Chaung	163476	Yae Twin Chaung	16.7421°N 94.5928°E	
Pein Hne Kwin	163475	Yae Twin Chaung	16.7291°N 94.6036°E	
Yae Twin Chaung	163474	Yae Twin Chaung	16.7607°N 94.6015°E	
Than Pat Kone	163477	Yae Twin Chaung	16.7305°N 94.5932°E	
Doe Kone (Shan Su)	161247	Taung Tan Kone	16.6375°N 94.6032°E	
Ah Lel Kone	161248	Taung Tan Kone	16.6532°N 94.6124°E	
Myin Ka Kwin Kone	161249	Taung Tan Kone	16.6784°N 94.5999°E	
Gant Gaw Chaw	161250	Taung Tan Kone	16.6334°N 94.6172°E	
Ma Tawt Kone	161246	Taung Tan Kone	16.6632°N 94.6003°E	
Myin Ka Kwin	161245	Taung Tan Kone	16.6722°N 94.6019°E	
Taung Tan Kone	161244	Taung Tan Kone	16.6436°N 94.6138°E	
Sar Hpyu Kone	155559	Kyet Paung		
Kyet Paung	155558	Kyet Paung	16.7091°N 94.692°E	
Moe Goke	157687	Moe Goke	16.8044°N 94.6398°E	
Thea Hpyu	157688	Moe Goke	16.8139°N 94.6419°E	
Sin Gaung	157690	Moe Goke	16.8183°N 94.6365°E	
Nwe Pat	157689	Moe Goke	16.794°N 94.6275°E	
Shunt Inn	162887	Tun Pa Lun	16.8445°N 94.6342°E	
War Taw Gyi	162886	Tun Pa Lun	16.8338°N 94.6476°E	
Tun Pa Lun	162885	Tun Pa Lun	16.8335°N 94.6555°E	
Ta Laing Lay Kone	162888	Tun Pa Lun	16.8539°N 94.642°E	
Za Yat Seik	163941	Za Yat Seik	16.698°N 94.6347°E	
Aung Thar	163943	Za Yat Seik	16.6716°N 94.6323°E	
Nga Hpei Ngo	163942	Za Yat Seik		
Nyaung Pin Kwin	163944	Za Yat Seik	16.7115°N 94.6162°E	
Auk Wea Gyi	163946	Za Yat Seik	16.6874°N 94.631°E	
Ah Htet Wea Gyi	163945	Za Yat Seik	16.6905°N 94.6302°E	
Kya Khat Chaung	162660	Thit Poke Kone	16.8033°N 94.703°E	
Bant Bway Kone	162659	Thit Poke Kone	16.7791°N 94.7042°E	
Pi Tauk Chaung	162658	Thit Poke Kone	16.7802°N 94.6982°E	
Taik Gyi Kone	162657	Thit Poke Kone	16.7867°N 94.6863°E	
Thit Poke Kone	162656	Thit Poke Kone	16.8146°N 94.6987°E	
Nat Ka Kone	162661	Thit Poke Kone	16.7875°N 94.7028°E	
Chay Htauk Shey	159772	Sa Par Htar		
Ma Yan Kwin	159771	Sa Par Htar	16.8718°N 94.6609°E	
Boe Ni Par	159776	Sa Par Htar	16.8795°N 94.6512°E	
Rakhine Bweit	159774	Sa Par Htar		
Pan Taw Gyi	159770	Sa Par Htar	16.8816°N 94.6445°E	
Sa Par Htar	159769	Sa Par Htar	16.87°N 94.6424°E	
Inn Kone Gyi	159775	Sa Par Htar		
Hpyu Lay Kone	159773	Sa Par Htar		
Ma Gyi Kone	157083	Ma Gyi Kone	16.7125°N 94.7176°E	
Chaung Wa	157085	Ma Gyi Kone	16.7084°N 94.7169°E	
Pyay Taw Thar	157084	Ma Gyi Kone	16.7154°N 94.7238°E	
Shwe Myin Tin	160394	Shwe Myin Tin	16.9023°N 94.7361°E	
Kya Khat Kone	160399	Shwe Myin Tin		
Wet Lar Chaung	160398	Shwe Myin Tin	16.9085°N 94.7389°E	
War Yar Chaung	160397	Shwe Myin Tin	16.9155°N 94.7422°E	
Nyaung Waing	160396	Shwe Myin Tin	16.8909°N 94.7555°E	
Thit Poke Kone	160395	Shwe Myin Tin	16.8811°N 94.7325°E	
Lay EinTan	157291	Ma Yan Chaung		
Gyaik Kone	157289	Ma Yan Chaung	16.8305°N 94.7382°E	
Taung Thar Kone	157290	Ma Yan Chaung		
Gway Cho	157288	Ma Yan Chaung	16.8365°N 94.7392°E	
War Net Kwin	157287	Ma Yan Chaung	16.84°N 94.7422°E	
Ma Yan Chaung (Myanmar)	157286	Ma Yan Chaung	16.8337°N 94.7548°E	
Ma Yan Chaung (Kayin)	157285	Ma Yan Chaung	16.8254°N 94.7579°E	
Kyauk Sa Yit Kone	157292	Ma Yan Chaung	16.8425°N 94.7422°E	
Zin Pyun Kone	164058	Zin Pyun Kone	16.8695°N 94.747°E	
Myin Chaung	164059	Zin Pyun Kone	16.8695°N 94.7362°E	
Hnget Chay Chaung	164061	Zin Pyun Kone	16.8475°N 94.7452°E	
Kone Gyi	164063	Zin Pyun Kone		
Kwin Yar Kone	164064	Zin Pyun Kone	16.8746°N 94.7628°E	
Tha Yet Ta Pin	164066	Zin Pyun Kone	16.8718°N 94.7661°E	
Yae Twin Kone	164060	Zin Pyun Kone		
Ah Ngu Gyi	164067	Zin Pyun Kone	16.8656°N 94.7846°E	
Nga Yant Kyaw	164068	Zin Pyun Kone	16.8417°N 94.7809°E	
San Gyi Kone	164069	Zin Pyun Kone	16.8684°N 94.7684°E	
Thea Hpyu Gyi	164070	Zin Pyun Kone	16.8912°N 94.7227°E	
Ywar Thit Kone	164071	Zin Pyun Kone		
But Gyi	164072	Zin Pyun Kone	16.8745°N 94.7952°E	
None Chaung	164073	Zin Pyun Kone		
Ka Nyin Ni Kone	164074	Zin Pyun Kone	16.8904°N 94.7754°E	
Ma Dawt Chaung	164075	Zin Pyun Kone		
San Kant Lant	164076	Zin Pyun Kone		
Thit Poke Kone	164065	Zin Pyun Kone	16.8773°N 94.7346°E	
Thaik War Kone	164062	Zin Pyun Kone		
Be Ga Yet	154453	Koe Su		
Koe Su	154452	Koe Su	16.826°N 94.7948°E	
Kyauk Pone	154454	Koe Su	16.8466°N 94.7923°E	
Taik Sun	154455	Koe Su	16.8118°N 94.7871°E	
Thea Hpyu	154456	Koe Su	16.8508°N 94.7977°E	
Pauk Kone	159156	Pauk Kone	16.75°N 94.7564°E	
Tar Lan	159157	Pauk Kone		
Ka Nyin Kone	159158	Pauk Kone	16.7765°N 94.774°E	
Kywe Chan	159161	Pauk Kone		
Hpa Yar Gyi Kone	159160	Pauk Kone	16.7685°N 94.7569°E	
Kya Khat Kone	159159	Pauk Kone	16.7555°N 94.7562°E	
Tha Yet Kone	157982	Myo Chaung		
Aung Tha Pyay	157981	Myo Chaung		
Aung Min Ga Lar	157980	Myo Chaung	16.7993°N 94.7916°E	
Myo Chaung	157979	Myo Chaung	16.7964°N 94.797°E	
Ka Nyin Kone	159565	Pyin Ka Doe Kone	16.7799°N 94.7732°E	
Saing Chan	159563	Pyin Ka Doe Kone	16.7848°N 94.7836°E	
Pyin Ka Doe Kone	159562	Pyin Ka Doe Kone	16.7812°N 94.7659°E	
Nga Gyi Htu	159564	Pyin Ka Doe Kone	16.7895°N 94.7784°E	
Chaung Thar	151170	Chaung Thar (Shwethaungyan Sub-township)	16.9604°N 94.447°E	
Kan Gyi	151171	Chaung Thar (Shwethaungyan Sub-township)	16.9408°N 94.4464°E	
Ka Nyin Kwin	151172	Chaung Thar (Shwethaungyan Sub-township)	16.9207°N 94.4348°E	
Seik Gyi	151173	Chaung Thar (Shwethaungyan Sub-township)	16.954°N 94.5201°E	
Kyu Taw	162353	Thea Kone (Shwethaungyan Sub-township)	17.1392°N 94.4923°E	
Thea Kone	162352	Thea Kone (Shwethaungyan Sub-township)	17.1126°N 94.4974°E	
Poe Laung	162354	Thea Kone (Shwethaungyan Sub-township)	17.1737°N 94.4721°E	
Wet Thay	162355	Thea Kone (Shwethaungyan Sub-township)	17.1478°N 94.4711°E	
Taung Kone	162356	Thea Kone (Shwethaungyan Sub-township)	17.1541°N 94.4515°E	
Tha Bawt Kan	161484	Tha Bawt Kan (Shwethaungyan Sub-township)		
Ma Thar	161487	Tha Bawt Kan (Shwethaungyan Sub-township)		
Hpone Soe	161486	Tha Bawt Kan (Shwethaungyan Sub-township)		
Kyun Chaung	161485	Tha Bawt Kan (Shwethaungyan Sub-township)		
Kyu Taw	161489	Tha Bawt Kan (Shwethaungyan Sub-township)		
Ku Toet Seik	161490	Tha Bawt Kan (Shwethaungyan Sub-township)		
Kyauk Pan Tet	161488	Tha Bawt Kan (Shwethaungyan Sub-township)		
Gyeik Let	150763	Baw Mi (Shwethaungyan Sub-township)		
Kaing Taw	150762	Baw Mi (Shwethaungyan Sub-township)		
Hpyar Taik	150761	Baw Mi (Shwethaungyan Sub-township)		
Baw Mi	150757	Baw Mi (Shwethaungyan Sub-township)		
Taung Ni Maw	150758	Baw Mi (Shwethaungyan Sub-township)		
Kyauk Kat Kyun	150759	Baw Mi (Shwethaungyan Sub-township)		
Kyauk Ta Lone	150760	Baw Mi (Shwethaungyan Sub-township)		
Than Man Kyaing	157143	Ma Gyi Zin (Shwethaungyan Sub-township)		
Ku Lar Chaung	157146	Ma Gyi Zin (Shwethaungyan Sub-township)		
Gyaing Lel	157145	Ma Gyi Zin (Shwethaungyan Sub-township)	16.7679°N 94.3891°E	
Pauk Tu Kwin	157144	Ma Gyi Zin (Shwethaungyan Sub-township)		
Ma Gyi Zin	157142	Ma Gyi Zin (Shwethaungyan Sub-township)		
Pauk Hla Kyaing	157147	Ma Gyi Zin (Shwethaungyan Sub-township)		
Ah Kyee Zin Hpyar	157148	Ma Gyi Zin (Shwethaungyan Sub-township)		
Tha Yet Wan Pu	158243	Nga Kwa (Ngwesaung Sub-township)	16.7803°N 94.5695°E	
Nat Kone	158235	Nga Kwa (Ngwesaung Sub-township)	16.7534°N 94.5658°E	
Bant Bway Kone	158244	Nga Kwa (Ngwesaung Sub-township)	16.7887°N 94.582°E	
Kyee Pin Kone	158237	Nga Kwa (Ngwesaung Sub-township)	16.7709°N 94.5687°E	
Kaing Chaung	158238	Nga Kwa (Ngwesaung Sub-township)	16.7655°N 94.5759°E	
Nga Kwa	158234	Nga Kwa (Ngwesaung Sub-township)	16.7747°N 94.5857°E	
Nan Kyar Kone	158239	Nga Kwa (Ngwesaung Sub-township)	16.7532°N 94.5828°E	
Kyar Inn Kone	158240	Nga Kwa (Ngwesaung Sub-township)	16.7831°N 94.562°E	
Ah Nan Kone	158242	Nga Kwa (Ngwesaung Sub-township)	16.787°N 94.5784°E	
Thar Yar Kone	158236	Nga Kwa (Ngwesaung Sub-township)	16.7683°N 94.58°E	
Kyar Ni Kan	158241	Nga Kwa (Ngwesaung Sub-township)		
Hpa Yar Kone	155584	Kyet Tu Yway (Ngwesaung Sub-township)	16.7845°N 94.6081°E	
La Yaung	155583	Kyet Tu Yway (Ngwesaung Sub-township)	16.7829°N 94.5999°E	
Wun Thay	155582	Kyet Tu Yway (Ngwesaung Sub-township)	16.7973°N 94.587°E	
Kyet Tu Yway	155581	Kyet Tu Yway (Ngwesaung Sub-township)	16.7995°N 94.5938°E	
Te Thone Lone	150174	Ah Lel (a) Ah Lel Kone (Ngwesaung Sub-township)	16.8565°N 94.6237°E	
Seik Gyi	150173	Ah Lel (a) Ah Lel Kone (Ngwesaung Sub-township)	16.8505°N 94.6041°E	
Nyaung Kone	150176	Ah Lel (a) Ah Lel Kone (Ngwesaung Sub-township)	16.8325°N 94.5947°E	
Leik Inn Kone	150175	Ah Lel (a) Ah Lel Kone (Ngwesaung Sub-township)	16.8567°N 94.5848°E	
Ah Lel	150172	Ah Lel (a) Ah Lel Kone (Ngwesaung Sub-township)	16.8368°N 94.6059°E	
Tha Lat Khwar	161615	Tha Lat Khwar (Ngwesaung Sub-township)	16.8196°N 94.6142°E	
Bagan Bo	161616	Tha Lat Khwar (Ngwesaung Sub-township)	16.8225°N 94.6099°E	
Ah Htet Kyet Tu Yway	157237	Ma Tawt Kone (Ngwesaung Sub-township)	16.8092°N 94.5846°E	
Kyaung Kone	157236	Ma Tawt Kone (Ngwesaung Sub-township)	16.8178°N 94.5936°E	
Kwin Lay	157235	Ma Tawt Kone (Ngwesaung Sub-township)	16.819°N 94.5869°E	
Ywar Thit Kone	157234	Ma Tawt Kone (Ngwesaung Sub-township)		
Ma Tawt Kone	157233	Ma Tawt Kone (Ngwesaung Sub-township)	16.8169°N 94.5811°E	
Sit Ke Pone	157239	Ma Tawt Kone (Ngwesaung Sub-township)	16.8131°N 94.6016°E	
Rakhine Kone	157238	Ma Tawt Kone (Ngwesaung Sub-township)	16.83°N 94.5958°E	
Hlwa Sin Kone	156669	Lay Myet Hnar Kone (Ngwesaung Sub-township)	16.8569°N 94.6285°E	
Lay Myet Hnar Kone	156668	Lay Myet Hnar Kone (Ngwesaung Sub-township)	16.8307°N 94.6214°E	
Chaing Lel	161059	Ta Zin (Ngwesaung Sub-township)		
Ta Zin	161057	Ta Zin (Ngwesaung Sub-township)	16.8939°N 94.4011°E	
Boe Maung Chyaint	161058	Ta Zin (Ngwesaung Sub-township)		
Ma Yan Kone	160574	Sin Ma (Ngwesaung Sub-township)	16.749°N 94.3736°E	
Sin Ma	160572	Sin Ma (Ngwesaung Sub-township)	16.7383°N 94.3717°E	
Nyaung Oke	160573	Sin Ma (Ngwesaung Sub-township)	16.7332°N 94.3679°E	
Sar Hpyu Su (a) Kyauk Hpyar	159908	Sar Hpyu Su (a) Kyauk Hpyar (Ngwesaung Sub-township)	16.7588°N 94.3739°E	
Zee Hpyu	159909	Sar Hpyu Su (a) Kyauk Hpyar (Ngwesaung Sub-township)		
Kyun Lay	159912	Sar Hpyu Su (a) Kyauk Hpyar (Ngwesaung Sub-township)	16.7644°N 94.4002°E	
Ka Nyin Kone	159911	Sar Hpyu Su (a) Kyauk Hpyar (Ngwesaung Sub-township)	16.7614°N 94.3929°E	
Ywar Thit	159910	Sar Hpyu Su (a) Kyauk Hpyar (Ngwesaung Sub-township)	16.7734°N 94.404°E	
Ohn Pin Kone	159913	Sar Hpyu Su (a) Kyauk Hpyar (Ngwesaung Sub-township)		
