= Gaw Yin Gyi Island =

Island in Myanmar

Native name: ဂေါ်ရင်ဂျီကျွန်း
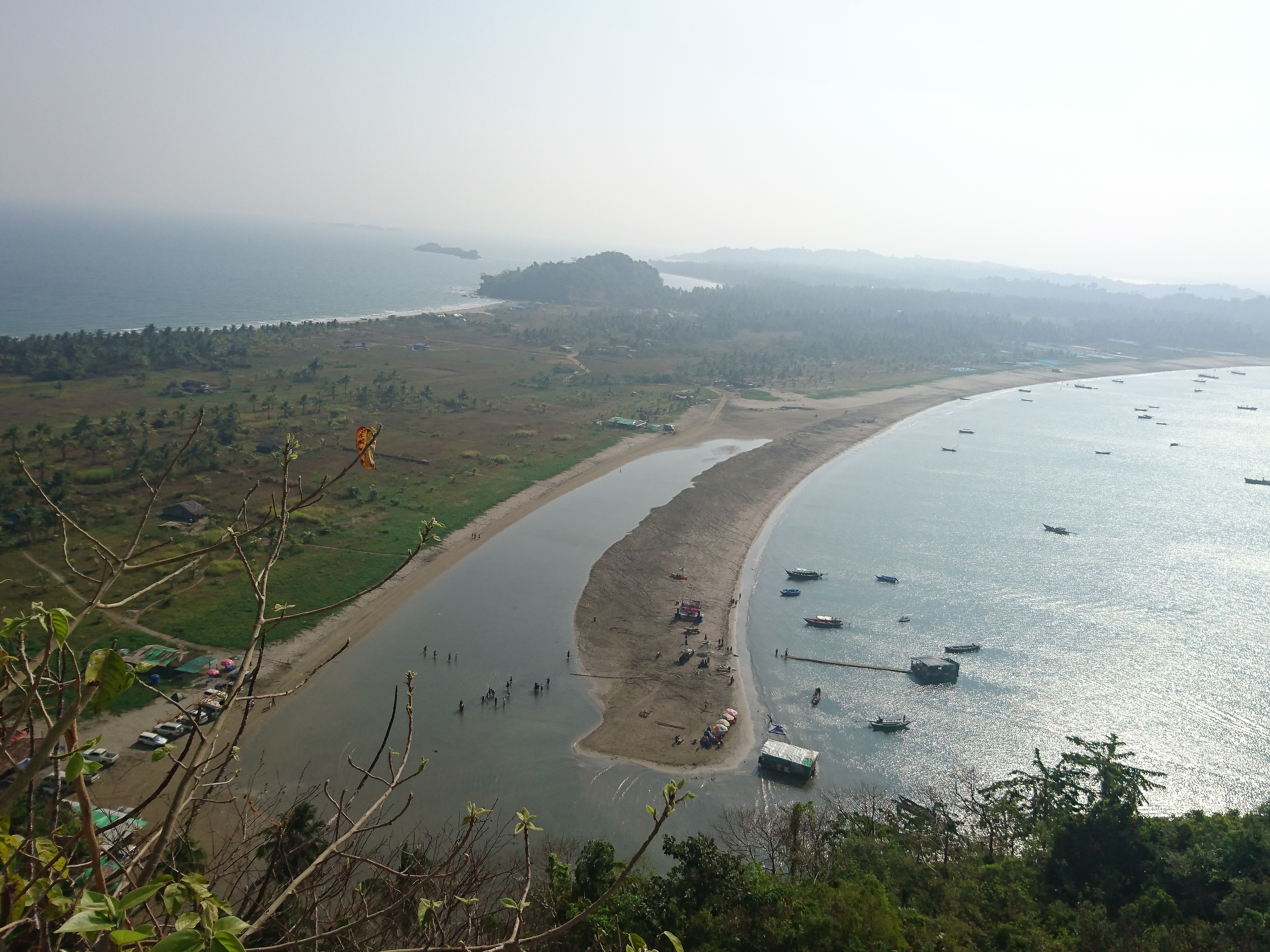

- Location within Myanmar

Geography
- Location: Ngayokekaung sub-township, Pathein District, Ayeyarwady Region, Myanmar
- Coordinates: 16.5331°N 94.2425°E

Gaw Yin Gyi Island (Burmese: ဂေါ်ရင်ဂျီကျွန်း) is an island in Ayeyarwady Region in South West Myanmar. It is located near Nanthapu village, Ngayokekaung sub-township, Pathein District of Myanmar. It is a tourist destination due to its beautiful rock formation and reefs.

== Geography ==
There are some rocky islets which also have beautiful and unspoiled beaches .

== Rock Climbing ==
There is a rock climbing and bouldering site. Deep water soloing is available.

== Transportation ==
While buses and cars operate, it is also reached by boat.

== Gallery ==
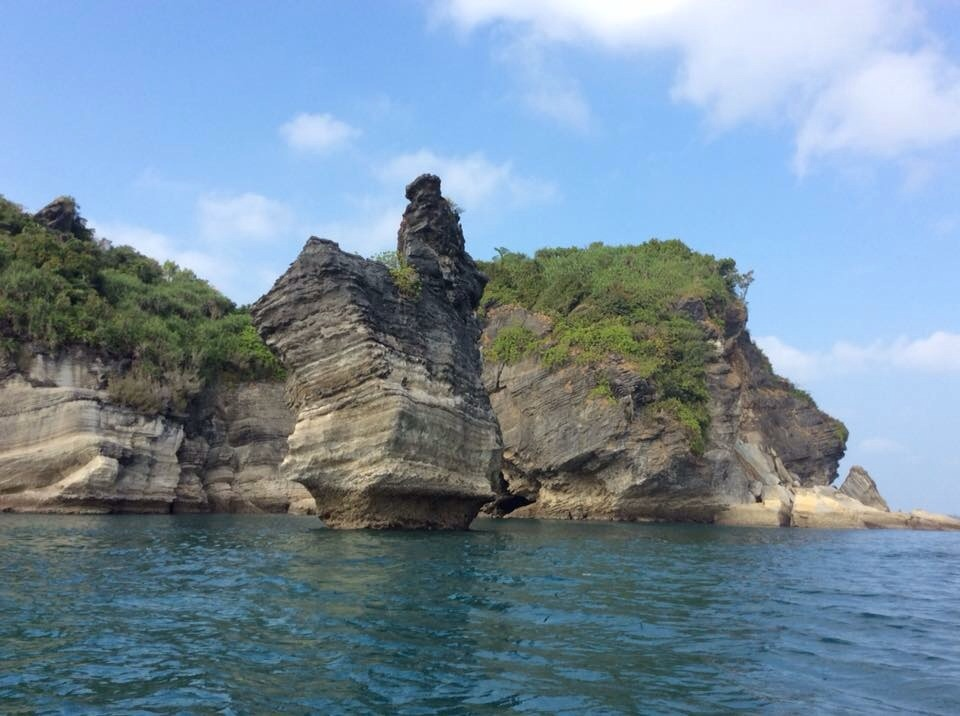
Deep water solo

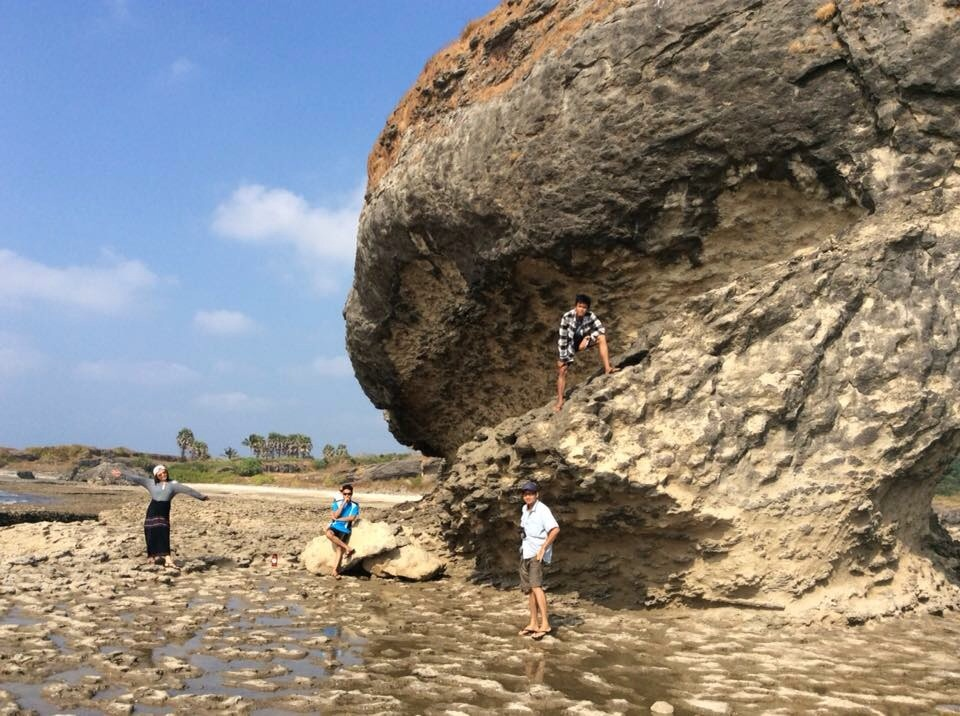
Rock climb
