= Shwethaungyan Subtownship =

Subtownship in Myanmar

Shwethaungyan Subtownship ရွှေသောင်ယံမြို့နယ်ခွဲ Shwe Thaung Yan Subtownship
- Subtownship
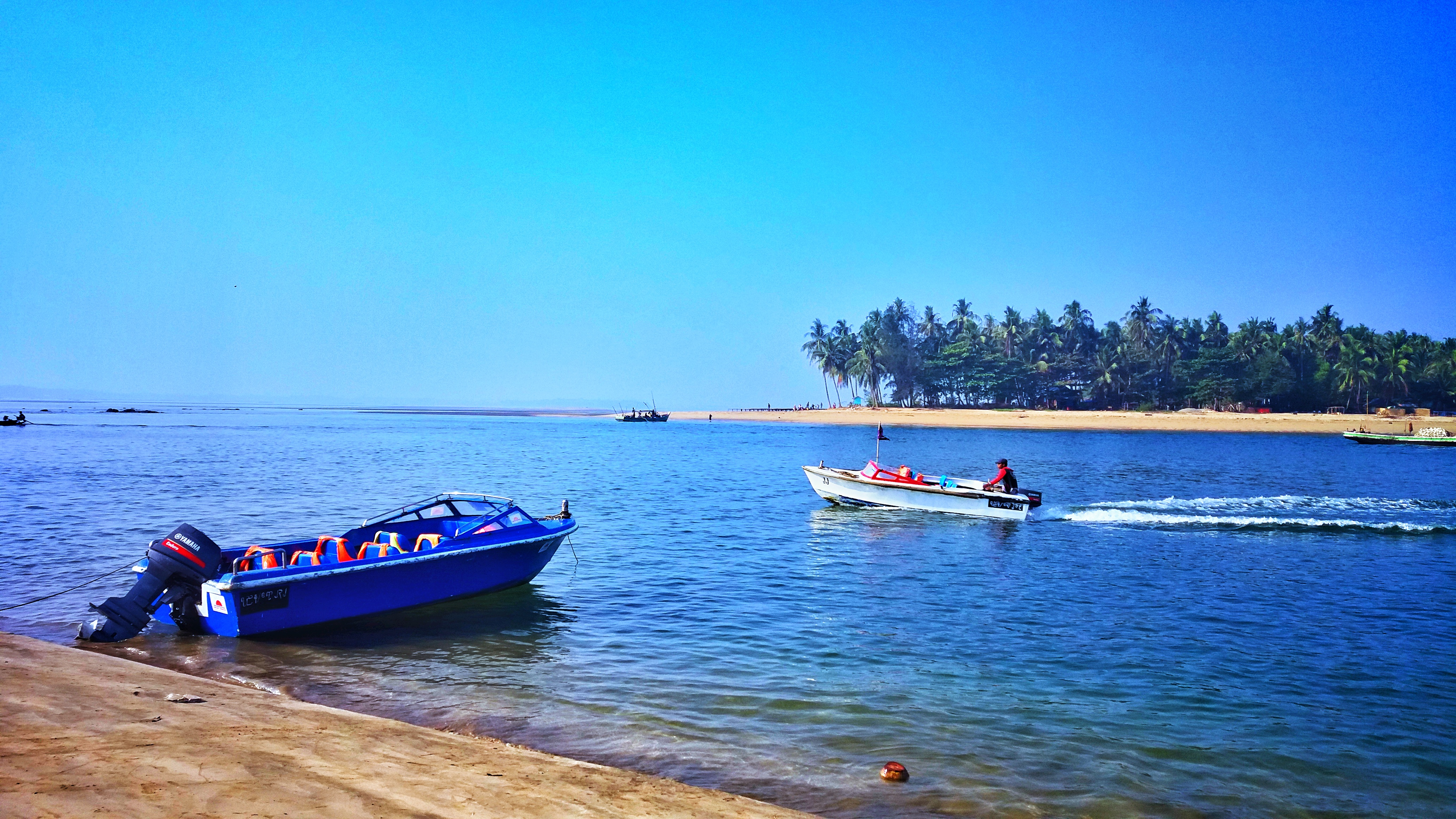
- View of Chaungtha Island from Chaungtha Beach

- Location in Pathein district
- Coordinates: 17°5′N 94°30′E
- Country: Myanmar
- Region: Ayeyawady Region
- District: Pathein District
- Township: Pathein Township

Area
  - Total: 178.5 sq mi (462.3 km^{2})

Population (2023)
  - Total: 44,435
  - Density: 248.9/sq mi (96.12/km^{2})
- Time zone: UTC+6:30 (MST)

Shwethaungyan Subtownship (Burmese: ရွှေသောင်ယံမြို့နယ်ခွဲ [ʃwè.ð̆àʊɰ̃.jàɰ̃ mjo̼.nɛ̀.kʰu̯ɛ́]), also spaced out as Shwe Thaung Yan, is a subtownship in Pathein District, Ayeyarwady Region, Myanmar. The subtownship is split between Pathein Township and Thabaung Township; it has a total area of 178.50 square miles (462.3 km^{2}), with 153.16 square miles (396.7 km^{2}) in Pathein and 25.34 square miles (65.6 km^{2}) in Thabaung.

== Communities ==
The namesake of the subtownship is the town of Shwethaungyan, within Pathein Township. Shwethaungyan is home to a mangrove forest formed from the Magyi tidal cheek. The town is divided into 3 urban wards with a total area of 1.48 square miles (3.8 km^{2}).

The largest town is Chaungtha, a beach resort popular with locals or weekend travellers from Yangon. In 2014, Chaungtha had total population of 3,077 people. The surrounding village tract around Chaungtha, had 27,941 people. In 2023, Chaungtha's village tract had 23,356 people.

The village of Phoe Htaung Gyaing, north of Shwethaungyan, lies near tidal seagrass meadows where seagrasses are exposed to air in low tides.

The village of Magyizin, near the Rakhine border, was the first village in Ayeyarwady Region to be captured by anti-junta forces during the 2020s Myanmar civil war. On 10 January, it was taken by the Arakan Army and joint allied forces.

== Geography ==
The subtownship is coastal, bordering the Bay of Bengal to its west. To its north, it borders Gwa Township, Rakhine State. To its south and east, it borders the remaining parts of Pathein Township and Thabaung Township.

Outside of its coastal areas, the subtownship is largely undeveloped and is home to a diverse variety of flora and fauna. The 39 primary tree species identified within the Pathein township portion include trees include hardwoods like teak and Burmese ironwood, fruit trees like mango and tamarind as well as coastal trees like Coconut trees. The Thabaung Township region has trees including pyinkado, Indian laurel, rattan, mango, and several varieties of jackfruit trees. Prominent animals in the subtownship include elephants, peacocks, pythons, gaur, black bears, iguana and myna birds.

Unlike most of Ayeyarwady Region, Shwethaungyan Subtownship's primary industry is not rice agriculture due to the area consisting of the Arakan Mountains and narrow coastal lands. Oil seed crops are the main crop cultivated.
