= List of villages in Kangyidaunt Township =

This is a list of villages in Kangyidaunt Township, Pathein District, Ayeyarwady Region, Burma (Myanmar).

Village	Village code	Village tract	Coordinates (links to map & photo sources)	Notes
Yae Kyaw Gyi	155047	Kyaik Lat		
Kyaik Lat	155046	Kyaik Lat	16.7667°N 94.8667°E	
Pyin Ka Doe Chaung	155049	Kyaik Lat		
Mei Dway Chaung	155048	Kyaik Lat		
Kyun Kone Lay	160882	Ta Kone Gyi		
Yae Kyaw	160880	Ta Kone Gyi		
Nyaung Pin Gyi Kone	160881	Ta Kone Gyi		
Ta Kone Gyi	160879	Ta Kone Gyi	16.8536°N 94.8389°E	
Tit Ti Tu Chaung	160883	Ta Kone Gyi		
Koe Thaung	160884	Ta Kone Gyi	16.8394°N 94.8192°E	
Yoe Kwa	154377	Khu Chaung	16.7738°N 94.9047°E	
Kyee Taw	154379	Khu Chaung		
Tar Ta Zin	154378	Khu Chaung		
Khu Chaung	154376	Khu Chaung		
Ywar Thit Kone	155486	Kyee Taw		
Hle Kyoe	155485	Kyee Taw		
Lat Toe	155483	Kyee Taw		
Kyee Taw	155482	Kyee Taw		
Moe Lone Su	155484	Kyee Taw		
Kone Su	156232	Kyun Hlyar Shey		
Nyaung Chaung	156233	Kyun Hlyar Shey		
Dar Ka Wa	156234	Kyun Hlyar Shey		
Oe Bo	156235	Kyun Hlyar Shey		
Nyaung Chaung (San Pya)	156236	Kyun Hlyar Shey		
Kyun Hlyar Shey	156231	Kyun Hlyar Shey		
Saing Chaung	158027	Na Nwin Ga Yet		
Thit Nyo Kone	158031	Na Nwin Ga Yet	16.8°N 94.7333°E	
Ga Yet Shey	158032	Na Nwin Ga Yet		
Leik San	158030	Na Nwin Ga Yet		
Kyar Laik	158028	Na Nwin Ga Yet		
Paung Pin Kwin	158026	Na Nwin Ga Yet		
Bu Tet	158025	Na Nwin Ga Yet		
Nga Khone Ma Chaung	158024	Na Nwin Ga Yet		
Na Nwin Ga Yet	158023	Na Nwin Ga Yet		
Taung Thar Kone	158029	Na Nwin Ga Yet		
Tha Yet Taw	152255	Hpa Yar Chaung		
Ywar Thit Kone	152257	Hpa Yar Chaung		
Kyaung Su	152256	Hpa Yar Chaung	16.9538°N 94.9835°E	
Mandalay Kone	152254	Hpa Yar Chaung		
Yae Kyaw Kone	152253	Hpa Yar Chaung		
Hpa Yar Chaung	152252	Hpa Yar Chaung		
Sar Hpyu Su	154983	Kwin Yar (East)	16.9269°N 94.934°E	
Ta Dar U	154984	Kwin Yar (East)		
Tha Yet Chaung	154982	Kwin Yar (East)		
Paw Taw Mu Yoe Gyi	154981	Kwin Yar (East)		
Kwin Yar Gyi	154980	Kwin Yar (East)		
Yway	163868	Yway		
Pay Chaung	156119	Kyon Yat	16.7047°N 94.8577°E	
Yae Twin Chaung	156120	Kyon Yat		
Pay Chaung Ywar Thit	156121	Kyon Yat	16.7095°N 94.8497°E	
Kyon Yat	156118	Kyon Yat		
Ah Su Gyi	150305	Ah Su Gyi	16.6418°N 94.7817°E	
Kan Kone	150308	Ah Su Gyi		
Pa De Kaw	150307	Ah Su Gyi		
Da Yei Chaung	150306	Ah Su Gyi		
Yae Twin Kone Lay	163536	Yae Twin Kone Lay	16.6261°N 94.7599°E	
Yway Kone	163872	Yway Kone		
Kywe Lan Su	159949	Sat Kwin		
Hpa Yar Kone	159948	Sat Kwin		
Pauk Ngu	159947	Sat Kwin		
Kwin Hlyar	159950	Sat Kwin		
Myaung Gyi	159952	Sat Kwin	16.914°N 94.9568°E	
Hpa Yar Chaung	159951	Sat Kwin		
Shwe Aye Chaung	159946	Sat Kwin		
Sat Kwin	159945	Sat Kwin	16.9333°N 94.95°E	
Kone Su	154986	Kwin Yar (West)		
Taw Win Su	154989	Kwin Yar (West)		
Tha Yet Taw	154988	Kwin Yar (West)		
Kyun Char	154985	Kwin Yar (West)	16.9545°N 94.9172°E	
Seik Gyi	154987	Kwin Yar (West)		
Thar Yar Kwin	163165	Wet Htoe		
Wet Htoe	163162	Wet Htoe		
Ywar Thit Kone	163164	Wet Htoe		
Yae Twin Su	163166	Wet Htoe		
Thone Gwa	163167	Wet Htoe		
Nyaung Pin su	163163	Wet Htoe		
Pyin Ma Ngu	159647	Pyin Ma Ngu	16.95°N 95.0167°E	
Moke Soe Ma Kwin	159648	Pyin Ma Ngu		
Gyoe Gyar Kwin	159653	Pyin Ma Ngu	16.9667°N 95°E	
Tha Khut Kone	159652	Pyin Ma Ngu		
Thin Gaung	159649	Pyin Ma Ngu		
Pon Taw Chaung	159651	Pyin Ma Ngu		
Kwin Ka Lay	159650	Pyin Ma Ngu		
Pay Pin Gyi	159243	Pay Pin Gyi		
Than Pu Yar Chaung	159247	Pay Pin Gyi	16.67°N 94.7322°E	
Lin Taing	159246	Pay Pin Gyi		
Kan Thar	159245	Pay Pin Gyi		
Thone Gwa	159244	Pay Pin Gyi		
Wea Chaung	156310	Kyun U	16.6916°N 94.8515°E	
Kan Ka Lay	156309	Kyun U		
Kyun U	156308	Kyun U		
Pa Lway Kyaw	163535	Yae Twin Kone Gyi		
Lin Khoe Chaung	163534	Yae Twin Kone Gyi		
Yae Twin Kone Gyi	163533	Yae Twin Kone Gyi	16.7904°N 94.839°E	
Kyaung Kone Su	163222	Yae Cho Kone		
Tha Pyu Kone	163225	Yae Cho Kone		
Ta Ku Chaung	163223	Yae Cho Kone	16.7745°N 94.8233°E	
Yae Cho Kone	163221	Yae Cho Kone	16.7753°N 94.802°E	
Nyaung Waing	163224	Yae Cho Kone		
Thu Htay Kone	160145	Shan		
Shan	160144	Shan	16.7268°N 94.7733°E	
Kywe Chan Chaung Hpyar	160146	Shan		
Kyan Tha Kar Chaung	162276	Thea Hpyu		
Thea Hpyu	162272	Thea Hpyu	16.7551°N 94.8158°E	
Shan Su	162275	Thea Hpyu		
Kywe Chan Kyan Tha Kar	162274	Thea Hpyu		
Khaw Ma Kyar	162273	Thea Hpyu		
Nga Hpe Chaung	157817	Myat Lay Chaung		
Myat Lay Chaung	157815	Myat Lay Chaung	16.7667°N 94.8333°E	
Yae Twin Chaung	157816	Myat Lay Chaung		
Hpa Yar Pyo (Ah Twin Su)	162214	Thaung Gyi	16.7371°N 94.8122°E	
Thaung Gyi	162210	Thaung Gyi	16.7212°N 94.7982°E	
Chaung Hpyar	162211	Thaung Gyi		
U Yin Chaung Su	162213	Thaung Gyi		
Hpa Yar Pyo (Ah Pyin)	162215	Thaung Gyi	16.7408°N 94.8096°E	
Ah Nyar Su	162212	Thaung Gyi		
Taik Gyi Kone	150529	Auk Ta Khun Taing	16.75°N 94.85°E	
Wea Daunt	150531	Auk Ta Khun Taing		
Yae Saing	150530	Auk Ta Khun Taing	16.7417°N 94.8456°E	
Gant Gaw Kan	150532	Auk Ta Khun Taing	16.7167°N 94.8333°E	
Shan Chaung	150528	Auk Ta Khun Taing		
Saung Bon	150527	Auk Ta Khun Taing		
Auk Ta Khun Taing	150526	Auk Ta Khun Taing		
Kyon Chaung	155679	Kyon Gyi		
Kyon Gyi	155674	Kyon Gyi		
Nyaung Chaung	155675	Kyon Gyi		
Ngu Kaing	155676	Kyon Gyi		
Lel Di	155677	Kyon Gyi		
Hle Seik	155678	Kyon Gyi		
Kywe Lan	155680	Kyon Gyi		
Za Yat Seik	154603	Ku Lar Kwin		
Ku Lar Kwin	154600	Ku Lar Kwin		
Kwet Pyin	154601	Ku Lar Kwin		
Pay Kone	154602	Ku Lar Kwin	16.8065°N 94.9227°E	
Taw Di	154606	Ku Lar Kwin		
Ywar Thit	154605	Ku Lar Kwin		
Kyon Kha Yin	154604	Ku Lar Kwin		
Kan Su	158588	Nyaung Pin Thar		
Nyaung Pin Thar	158583	Nyaung Pin Thar		
Pi Tauk Kone	158584	Nyaung Pin Thar		
Hnget Pyaw Taw	158589	Nyaung Pin Thar		
Tha Yet Taw	158585	Nyaung Pin Thar		
Bant Bway Kone	158586	Nyaung Pin Thar		
Chaung Hpyar	158587	Nyaung Pin Thar		
Shwe War Chaung	154375	Khon Zin Kone		
Ah Nyar Su	154372	Khon Zin Kone		
Nga Shint Htu	154373	Khon Zin Kone		
Yoe Gyi	154374	Khon Zin Kone		
Kan Kone	154368	Khon Zin Kone	16.858°N 94.8457°E	
Kyun Chaung	154369	Khon Zin Kone	16.8733°N 94.8568°E	
Ba Mar Su	154370	Khon Zin Kone		
Kyun Chaung (Kayin Su)	154371	Khon Zin Kone	16.8691°N 94.8527°E	
Pay Pin (Khwar Kwin)	159242	Pay Pin (Dei Kan)		
Pay Pin (Ywar Thit)	159241	Pay Pin (Dei Kan)	16.6811°N 94.7572°E	
Pay Pin (Dei Kan)	159240	Pay Pin (Dei Kan)	16.6664°N 94.7727°E	
Ah Nyar Su	157597	Mi Chaung Gaung		
Hlwa Sin Seik	157598	Mi Chaung Gaung	16.6106°N 94.8189°E	
Ah Shey Su	156931	Let Saung Kwin		
Let Saung Kwin	156927	Let Saung Kwin		
Maung Tee	156928	Let Saung Kwin	16.6557°N 94.8246°E	
Ah Lel Su	156930	Let Saung Kwin		
Sit Kone	156929	Let Saung Kwin		
Kan	153774	Kan	16.5947°N 94.7733°E	
Yway Chaung	152785	Htein Taw Gyi		
Mi Chaung Thaik	152782	Htein Taw Gyi	16.6721°N 94.7938°E	
Ngu Chaung	152784	Htein Taw Gyi		
Kan Chaung	152786	Htein Taw Gyi		
Ba Mar Su	152783	Htein Taw Gyi		
Ywar Thit Kone	157607	Mi Chaung Ta Yar		
Khon Zin Kone	157606	Mi Chaung Ta Yar	16.8736°N 94.8816°E	
Ah Ngu Gyi	157605	Mi Chaung Ta Yar		
Be Ga Yet Gyi	157604	Mi Chaung Ta Yar	16.904°N 94.9185°E	
Ka Nyin Ngu	157603	Mi Chaung Ta Yar		
Mi Chaung Ta Yar	157602	Mi Chaung Ta Yar	16.8933°N 94.8987°E	
Kone Su	157609	Mi Chaung Ta Yar		
Kyee Kan Kyun	157608	Mi Chaung Ta Yar		
Ywar Thit Kone	150236	Ah Pin Hnit Se		
Thaw Ka Kone	150234	Ah Pin Hnit Se		
Ah Pin Hnit Se	150233	Ah Pin Hnit Se		
Than That Kyun	150235	Ah Pin Hnit Se		
Ku Lar Kone	159423	Pi Tauk Pin		
Ta Kyun Kone	159422	Pi Tauk Pin		
Pi Tauk Pin	159421	Pi Tauk Pin	16.9445°N 94.8653°E	
Dar Ka	151346	Dar Ka	16.9686°N 94.984°E	
Paik Thaung	151347	Dar Ka		
Kyein Chaung	151348	Dar Ka		
Yoe Gyi	151349	Dar Ka	16.9702°N 94.9624°E	
Yoe Gyi Hpyar Tan	151351	Dar Ka		
Lay Bway Chaung	151350	Dar Ka		
Leik Ka Bar	156692	Leik Ka Bar	16.6658°N 94.8589°E	
Gyo Kar	156694	Leik Ka Bar		
Kan Chaung	156693	Leik Ka Bar		
Ah Nauk Su	151708	Gon Hyin Tan		
Kyar Chaung	151709	Gon Hyin Tan		
Chon Oke	151710	Gon Hyin Tan		
Chaung Wa	151706	Gon Hyin Tan		
Kyee Chaung	151705	Gon Hyin Tan		
U Yin Chaung	151704	Gon Hyin Tan		
Gon Hyin Tan	151703	Gon Hyin Tan	16.67°N 94.8916°E	
Hnget Pyaw Taw	151707	Gon Hyin Tan		
Ohn Pin Su	150037	Ah Da Lauk		
Kone Su	150036	Ah Da Lauk		
Yae Lel Kwin	150035	Ah Da Lauk		
Lel Di	150038	Ah Da Lauk		
Ah Da Lauk	150034	Ah Da Lauk	16.8667°N 94.9667°E	
Thin Pan Chaung	150039	Ah Da Lauk		
Chaung Wa	159303	Pein Chaung		
Kyar Chaung	159306	Pein Chaung		
Pein Chaung	159302	Pein Chaung		
Ah Lan Lay	159305	Pein Chaung		
Ah Ma Lauk Wa	159304	Pein Chaung		
Kun Chan Kone	155638	Kyon Da Yei	16.8106°N 94.971°E	
War Yon Su	155639	Kyon Da Yei		
Ah Shey Chaung	155640	Kyon Da Yei		
Kyon Da Yei	155637	Kyon Da Yei		
Kwin Su	157890	Myin Ka Seik		
Sar Hpyu su	157891	Myin Ka Seik		
Tha Man Chaung (Ta Man Chaung)	157896	Myin Ka Seik		
Ta Dar Gyi	157893	Myin Ka Seik		
Myin Ka Seik	157886	Myin Ka Seik	16.737°N 94.8926°E	
Kyat Kone	157894	Myin Ka Seik		
Tha Bawt Chaung	157889	Myin Ka Seik		
Zee Hpyu Chaung	157888	Myin Ka Seik		
Htee Taw Moe	157887	Myin Ka Seik		
Htan Pin Chaung	157895	Myin Ka Seik		
Let Pan Kone	157892	Myin Ka Seik		
Pan Pin Seik	159175	Pauk Kyun		
Let Pan Kone	159174	Pauk Kyun		
Auk Su	159176	Pauk Kyun		
Set Kone	159177	Pauk Kyun		
Kyon War	159178	Pauk Kyun	16.7899°N 94.9663°E	
Pauk Kyun	159173	Pauk Kyun		
Tha Yet Kwin Yae Kyaw Gyi	161909	Tha Yet Kwin	16.6877°N 94.8282°E	
Thea Kone	161910	Tha Yet Kwin		
Kywe Kwin	163102	Wea Gyi		
Sa Lu Chaung Ywar Thit	163101	Wea Gyi		
Wea Gyi	163100	Wea Gyi	16.6961°N 94.7768°E	
Ah Su Gyi	160299	Shaw Kone		
Shaw Kone	160298	Shaw Kone	16.8521°N 94.8786°E	
Let Pan Kone	160300	Shaw Kone		
Lay Ein Tan	162954	War Du		
Kyar Tha Yut	162961	War Du		
Pale Ku Ohn Taw	162953	War Du		
Pale Ku (South)	162952	War Du		
Ah Nauk Su Gyi	162958	War Du		
Tha Yet Taw	162957	War Du		
Shwe Paw Kone	162955	War Du		
Ah Kei	162960	War Du		
Ah Nauk Su Kone	162959	War Du		
War Du	162948	War Du	16.8333°N 94.8833°E	
Ta Man Chaung	162949	War Du	16.8398°N 94.8894°E	
Ah Lel Kyun	162950	War Du		
Pale Ku (North)	162951	War Du		
Tha Pyay Kwin	162956	War Du		
Hle Kyoe	156823	Let Pan	16.7863°N 94.9169°E	
Nyaung Pin Thar	156824	Let Pan		
Ta Khun Taing	156822	Let Pan	16.8052°N 94.9409°E	
Chaung Kant Lant	156821	Let Pan		
Let Pan	156820	Let Pan		
Yae Lel Su	156285	Kyun Taw Kone		
Kyun Taw Kone	156282	Kyun Taw Kone	16.7703°N 94.9196°E	
Kya Khat Tan	156283	Kyun Taw Kone		
Bone Gyi Chaung	156284	Kyun Taw Kone		
Ywar Thit Kone	158465	Nyaung Kone		
Let Khoke	158463	Nyaung Kone		
Nyaung Kone	158461	Nyaung Kone		
Kan Su	158462	Nyaung Kone		
Kyaung Su	158464	Nyaung Kone		
Kayin Myaung Gyi	153547	Ka Nyut Kone		
Ba Mar Myaung Gyi	153548	Ka Nyut Kone		
Za Win Myaung Gyi	153549	Ka Nyut Kone		
Ka Nyut Kone	153545	Ka Nyut Kone	16.9043°N 94.9714°E	
Kya Khat Tan	153546	Ka Nyut Kone		
Shan Ngu	160205	Shan Ngu		
Yoe Gyi	152616	Htan Pin		
Kyu Tan Kyaung Kone	152615	Htan Pin		
Htan Pin	152614	Htan Pin	16.8488°N 94.9278°E	
Kya Khat Tan	152617	Htan Pin		
Sin Gaung Gyi	151197	Chaung Zauk		
Chaung Zauk	151196	Chaung Zauk	16.7167°N 94.75°E	
Kant Ba Lar	151199	Chaung Zauk		
Kan Su	151198	Chaung Zauk		
Chaung Hpyar	163541	Yae Twin Seik		
Shwe Ge Chaung	163542	Yae Twin Seik		
Kyon La Har	163539	Yae Twin Seik		
Tha Yet Taw	163540	Yae Twin Seik		
Ta Khun Taing	163538	Yae Twin Seik	16.6991°N 94.7958°E	
Yae Twin Seik	163537	Yae Twin Seik		
Ohn Taw	163543	Yae Twin Seik	16.7171°N 94.8139°E	
Pay Ta Pin	158777	Ohn Pin Seik		
Taung Thar Chaung	158778	Ohn Pin Seik	16.8219°N 94.8804°E	
Pyin Ma Pin Seik	158779	Ohn Pin Seik		
Chaung Hpyar	158780	Ohn Pin Seik		
Dei Kone	158781	Ohn Pin Seik		
Pay Pin Sar Hpyu Su	158782	Ohn Pin Seik	16.8315°N 94.9165°E	
Tan Hlyar Gyi	158776	Ohn Pin Seik		
Ma Gyi Kone	150091	Ah Htet Ta Khun Taing		
Pyin Htaung	150088	Ah Htet Ta Khun Taing		
Ma Yan Chaung	150089	Ah Htet Ta Khun Taing		
Ah Htet Ta Khun Taing	150086	Ah Htet Ta Khun Taing		
Kan Kone	150090	Ah Htet Ta Khun Taing		
Pyin Ka Doe	150087	Ah Htet Ta Khun Taing		
Ywar Thit Kone	160071	Seik Thar		
Seik Thar Lay	160067	Seik Thar	16.9167°N 95.0333°E	
Yae Kyaw	160068	Seik Thar		
Yae Twin Kone	160070	Seik Thar		
Ba Maw Chaung	160072	Seik Thar		
Htein Pin Kone	160073	Seik Thar		
Wea Chaung	160069	Seik Thar		
Ah Kei	156671	Lay Su		
Lay Su	156670	Lay Su		
Zee Kone	156672	Lay Su		
Nyaung Chaung	158411	Nyaung Chaung	16.7937°N 94.8684°E	
Kwet Pyin	158412	Nyaung Chaung		
U Taik Kone	158415	Nyaung Chaung		
Kan Kone	158414	Nyaung Chaung		
Wea	158413	Nyaung Chaung		
Ta Khun Taing	154748	Kun Thee Pin Seik		
Oke Pon Kone	154749	Kun Thee Pin Seik		
Chaung Nyi Naung	154750	Kun Thee Pin Seik		
Ka Nyin Pin	154751	Kun Thee Pin Seik		
Kun Thee Pin Seik	154747	Kun Thee Pin Seik		
Kan Kone	157241	Ma Tawt Kone		
Paw Taw Mu	157243	Ma Tawt Kone		
Byaik Su	157240	Ma Tawt Kone		
U Yin Su	157242	Ma Tawt Kone		
Kyon Pa Doke	155874	Kyon Pa Doke	16.823°N 94.8423°E	
Ah Kei	155877	Kyon Pa Doke	16.814°N 94.8508°E	
Ywar Thit Kone	155879	Kyon Pa Doke		
Paw Taw Mu	155878	Kyon Pa Doke		
Ta Kone Gyi	155875	Kyon Pa Doke		
Ga Yaung Kwin	155876	Kyon Pa Doke		
Tar Mi Kone Sun	155880	Kyon Pa Doke		
Kone Su	161492	Tha Bawt Ngu		
Tha Bawt Chaung	161494	Tha Bawt Ngu		
Yoe Gyi	161500	Tha Bawt Ngu		
Tha Bawt Ngu	161491	Tha Bawt Ngu		
Kwin Lel Su	161493	Tha Bawt Ngu		
Let Khoke Pin	161499	Tha Bawt Ngu		
Hpar Si Kwin	161498	Tha Bawt Ngu	16.9762°N 94.9403°E	
Yae Thoe Kone	161497	Tha Bawt Ngu		
Hnget Gyi Thaik	161496	Tha Bawt Ngu		
Kun Chan Su	161495	Tha Bawt Ngu		
Yae Twin Chaung	157179	Ma Ku Kyun		
Kan Taw	157182	Ma Ku Kyun		
Hpan Khar Kone	157180	Ma Ku Kyun		
Thit Ngoke To	157178	Ma Ku Kyun		
Myet To	157177	Ma Ku Kyun		
Nwe Ni	157176	Ma Ku Kyun		
Ma Ku Kyun	157175	Ma Ku Kyun	16.8908°N 94.8496°E	
Ma Kone Chaung	157181	Ma Ku Kyun		
U To	158633	Nyaung Waing		
Kan Hla	158635	Nyaung Waing		
Nyaung Waing	158632	Nyaung Waing	16.7459°N 94.9357°E	
Hpyan Gyi	158634	Nyaung Waing	16.7732°N 94.9557°E	
Kyu Tan	156128	Kyu Tan	16.8886°N 94.9451°E	
Kyu Tan Yoe Gyi	156129	Kyu Tan		
Htein Ta Pin	156130	Kyu Tan		
Ah Pyin Sar Hpyu Su	156131	Kyu Tan		
Htein Ta Pin Yoe Gyi	156132	Kyu Tan		
Nyaung Waing	156133	Kyu Tan		
Yae Thoe Lay	156492	La Har Ka Lu		
Tu Myaung	156495	La Har Ka Lu		
Bi Lu Kyun	156486	La Har Ka Lu		
Byaik Su	156487	La Har Ka Lu		
Pay Kone	156488	La Har Ka Lu	16.8916°N 94.9637°E	
Kyar Kaik	156489	La Har Ka Lu		
Gway Kone	156490	La Har Ka Lu		
Ah Twin Sar Hpyu Su	156493	La Har Ka Lu		
La Har Ka Lu Kyaung Su	156496	La Har Ka Lu		
Ma Gyi Pin Su	156494	La Har Ka Lu		
Yae Thoe Gyi	156491	La Har Ka Lu	16.9092°N 94.9403°E	
Kyauk Than Kyun	156213	Kyun Gyi		
Ma Yan Kyun	156217	Kyun Gyi		
Myaung Gyi	156216	Kyun Gyi		
Shwe Hla Sa Khan	156215	Kyun Gyi		
Tha Min Kyun	156214	Kyun Gyi		
Sat Thay Kyun	156212	Kyun Gyi		
Kyun Gyi	156211	Kyun Gyi	16.9143°N 94.8576°E	
Htan Kyun Kone	156218	Kyun Gyi		
Kywe Gaung	151512	Dee Doke		
Ta Khun Taing	151511	Dee Doke		
Baing Taunt	151510	Dee Doke		
Dee Doke	151507	Dee Doke		
Chaung Wa	151509	Dee Doke		
Saik Pyoe Chin	151508	Dee Doke		
