= Ngwesaung Subtownship =

Subtownship in Myanmar

Ngwesaung Subtownship ငွေဆောင်မြို့နယ်ခွဲ
- Subtownship
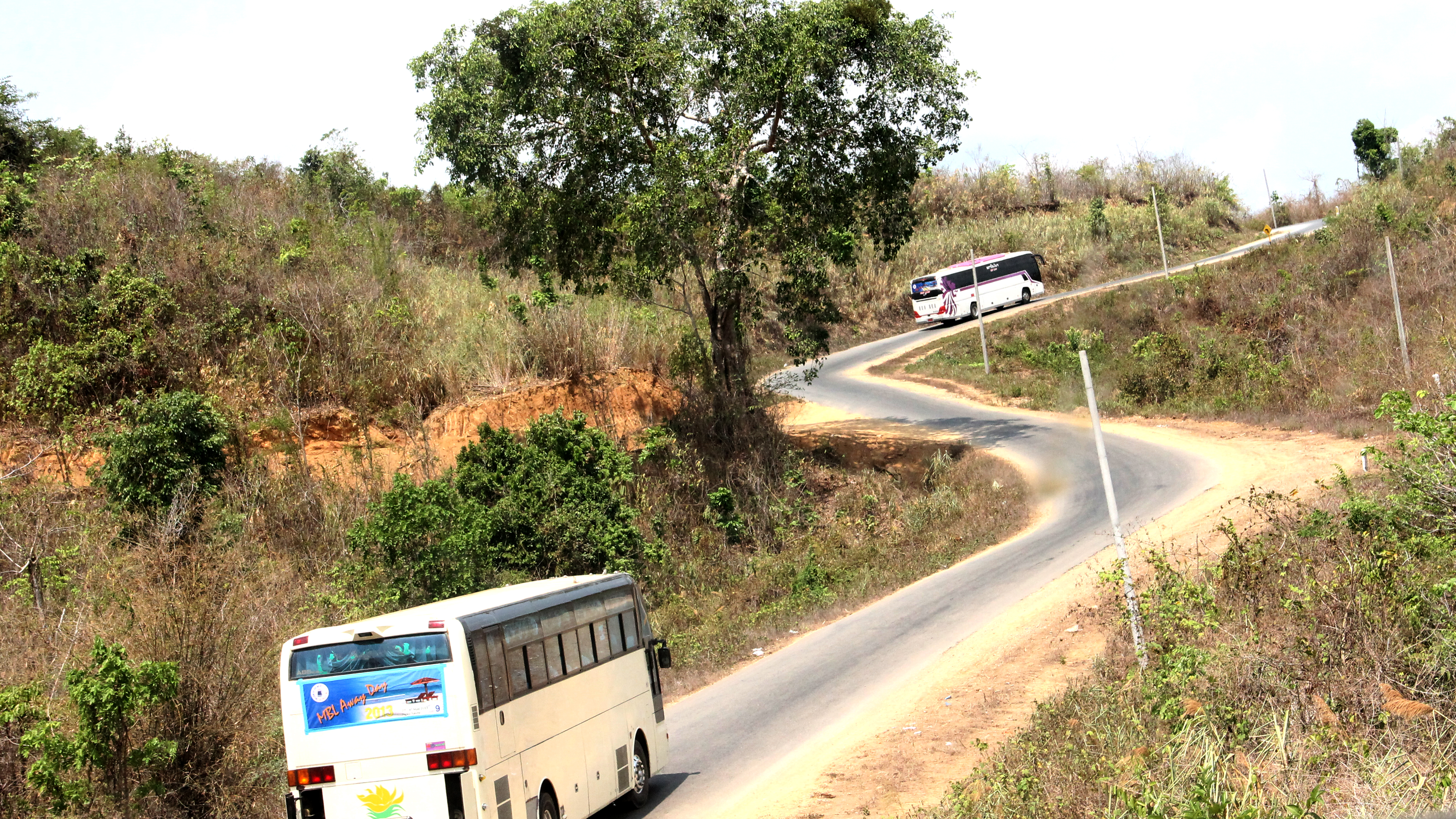
- Pathein-Ngwe Saung Road

- Location in Pathein district
- Coordinates: 16°52′N 94°29′E
- Country: Myanmar
- Region: Ayeyarwady Region
- District: Pathein District
- Township: Pathein Township

Area
  - Total: 230.63 sq mi (597.32 km^{2})

Population (2023)
  - Total: 41,592
  - Density: 180.34/sq mi (69.631/km^{2})
- Time zone: UTC+6:30 (MMT)

Ngwesaung Subtownship (Burmese: ငွေဆောင်မြို့နယ်ခွဲ) is a subtownship of Pathein Township in Pathein District, Ayeyarwady Region, Myanmar. The namesake of the subtownship is Ngwesaung, a popular beach resort with a white sand shore. The subtownship is relatively urban with 27.3% of the population in 2019 living within the town of Ngwesaung.

In 2023, the subtownship saw significant population growth going from 38,020 people in 2022 to 41,592 people in 2023.

== Geography ==
The subtownship is coastal, bordering the Bay of Bengal to its west. To its north, it borders Shwethaungyan subtownship and to its east, the remaining parts of Pathein Township. To its south, it borders Ngapudaw Township. The tallest point in Pathein Township, Mount Kyarlay at an elevation of 844 feet (257 m), is located within the subtownship.

Outside of its coastal areas, the subtownship is largely undeveloped and is home to a diverse variety of flora and fauna. The 39 primary tree species identified by the township include trees include hardwoods like teak and Burmese ironwood, fruit trees like mango and tamarind as well as coastal trees like Coconut trees. Prominent animals in the township include elephants, gaur, black bears, iguana. The Chaungtha reserve forest and the Sinma Beach Forest lie on the eastern and southern boundary of the town of Ngwesaung respectively. They are home to unique coastal bamboo species like Bambusa burmanica.
