= Chaungtha =

Town in Ayeyarwady, Myanmar

Chaungtha ချောင်းသာ
- Town
- Chaung Thar
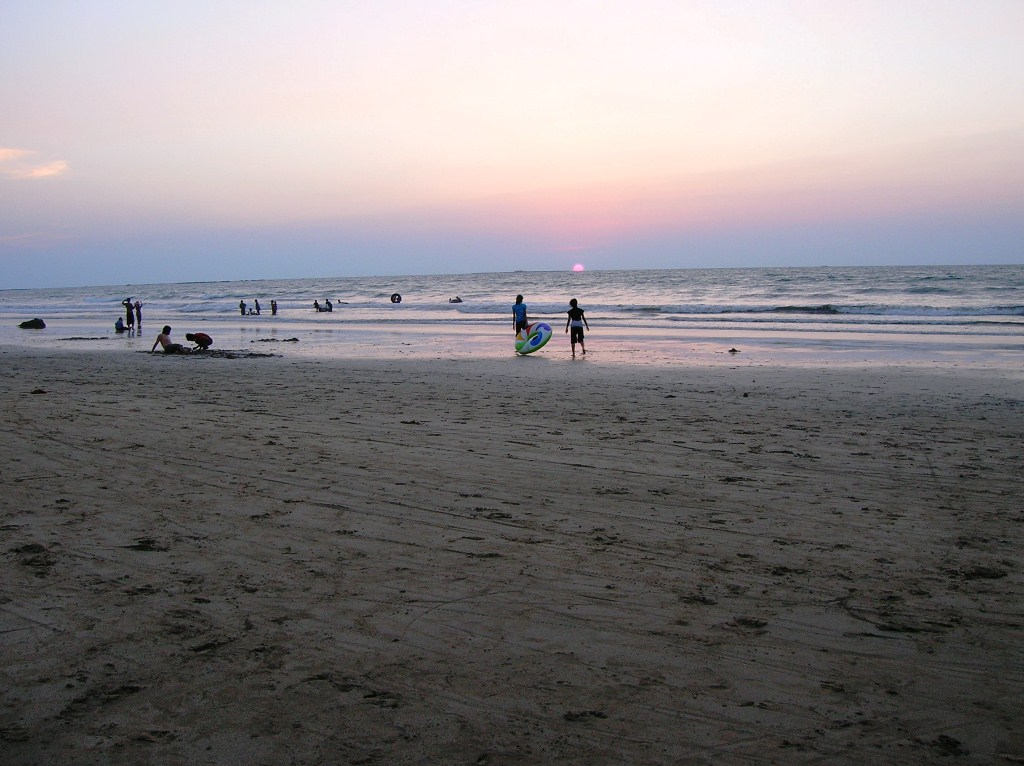

- Location within Myanmar
- Coordinates: 16°58′0″N 94°27′0″E
- Country: Myanmar
- Region: Ayeyarwady
- District: Pathein
- Township: Pathein
- Subtownship: Shwethaungyan

Area
  - Total: 65.7 km^{2} (25.35 sq mi)
- Elevation: 3.7 m (12 ft)

Population (2023)
  - Total: 23,356
  - Density: 355.7/km^{2} (921.3/sq mi)
- Time zone: UTC6:30 (MST)

Chaungtha (Burmese: ချောင်းသာ [tɕʰáʊɰ̃ ɾ̪θà]) is a town and beach resort located in Shwethaungyan Subtownship, Pathein Township, Ayeyarwady Region, Myanmar. Chaungtha Beach, as it is more commonly known, is about 5 hours' drive away from Yangon, and is a popular resort with Yangonites from October to April. As it is relatively more affordable than the nearby Ngwesaung and Ngapali beaches, Chaungtha is also more crowded and less clean than the two more expensive and better maintained beaches.

== Demographics and History ==
Chaungtha has three urban wards with a total population of 3,077 people in 2014. The surrounding village tract had a population of 27,941 people.

On 23 September 2016, Chaungtha was elevated to town status through Notification 1972/2016, encompassing the entire village tract and one other nearby village tract. In 2022, the town had a population of 22,374 people and grew to 23,356 people by 2023.

== Etymology ==
Chaungtha received its name from the small stream (chaung) which flows in the western part of the village. In the Burmese language, Chaungtha means Pleasant Stream.

== Attractions ==
Chaungtha is renowned for its fresh and reasonably priced seafood. A major attraction is a small pagoda built on a limestone boulder at the southern end of the beach. The main beach is more scrappy and down-to-earth. Nearby fishing villages and tidal mangrove forests are also popular among tourists.

Chaungtha has several offshore islands, available for snorkelling and is accessible from nearby Ngwesaung beach along a coastal motorbike trail.

== See also ==
- Ngwesaung Beach
- Thandwe
- Pathein
