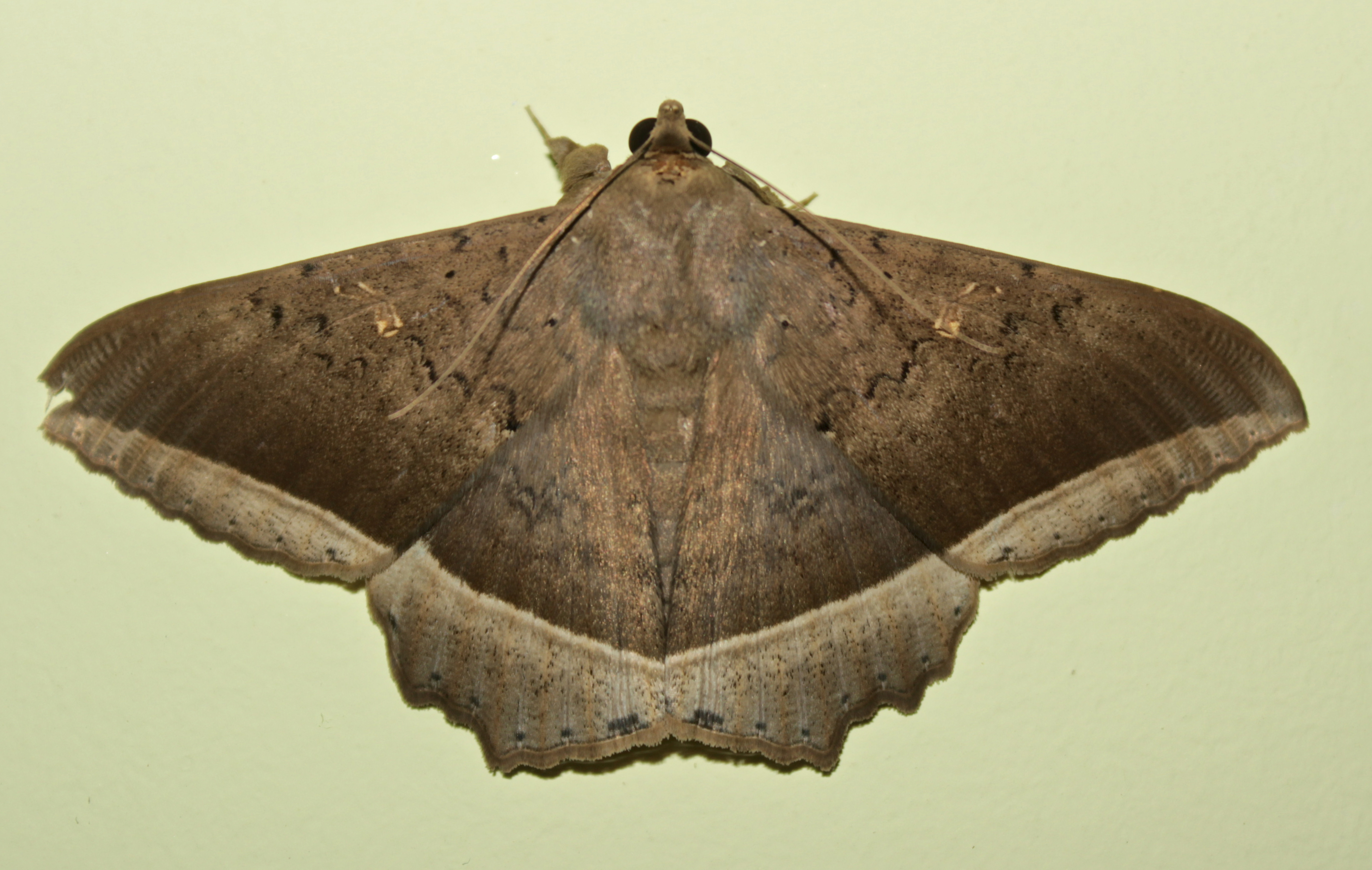

Scientific classification
- Kingdom: Animalia
- Phylum: Arthropoda
- Clade: Pancrustacea
- Class: Insecta
- Order: Lepidoptera
- Superfamily: Noctuoidea
- Family: Erebidae
- Genus: Hulodes
- Species: H. caranea

Binomial name
- Hulodes caranea (Cramer, 1780)

Synonyms
- Phalaena caranea Cramer, 1780; Hypopyra fusifascia Walker, 1869; Hypopyra mediomaculata Warren, 1913; Hulodes angulata Prout, 1928; Hylodes caranea

= Hulodes caranea =

Species of moth

Hulodes caranea is a species of moth of the family Erebidae first described by Pieter Cramer in 1780. It is found from India, Sri Lanka, Myanmar, Java, Hong Kong to Queensland and New Guinea, it is also found on the Marianas and Carolines.

== Description ==
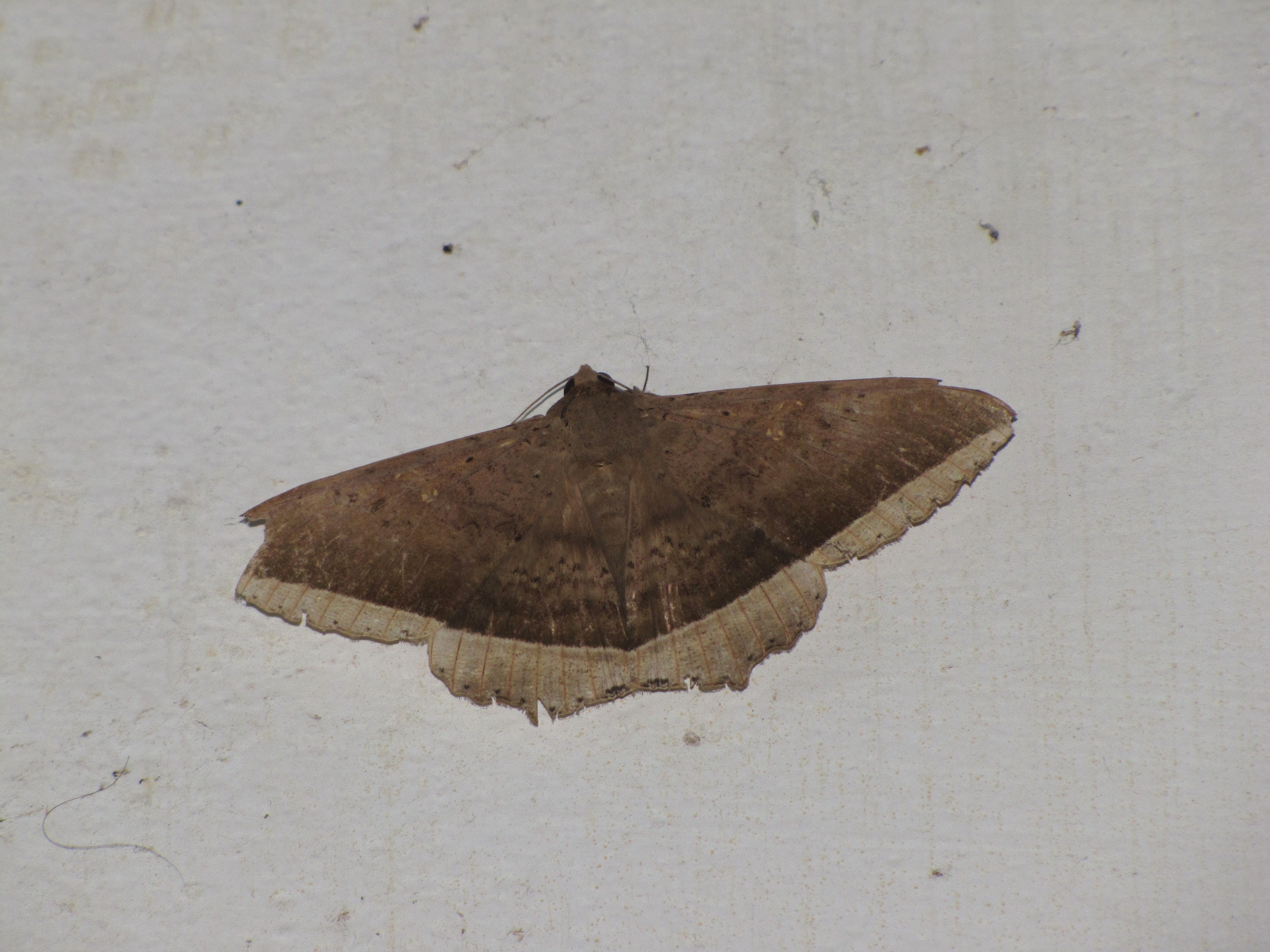
From Kannur, Kerala, India

The wingspan is about 84–90 mm. Hindwings with crenulate outer margin and produced to a point at vein 4. Male fuscous brown. Wings suffused with purplish as far as the curved submarginal line which runs from the apex to inner margin of hindwings, the area beyond it ochreous brown with a marginal specks series. Forewings with traces of antemedial and postmedial waved lines and brown centered ochreous lunule at end of cell. Hindwings with traces of antemedial waved line. Ventral side with crenulate medial line. Hindwings with black cell spot and spot at middle of costa ventrally. Female pale ochreous brown, with some dark brown suffusion inside the double oblique line.

Larva olive greenish in color with fuscous speckles and paler below. It has two pointed dorsal tubercles on anal somite. Dorsal and lateral bands of black streaks and greenish white blotches found on back and sides. Stigmata black and tubercles reddish. The larvae feed on Acanthaceae and Apocynaceae species.
