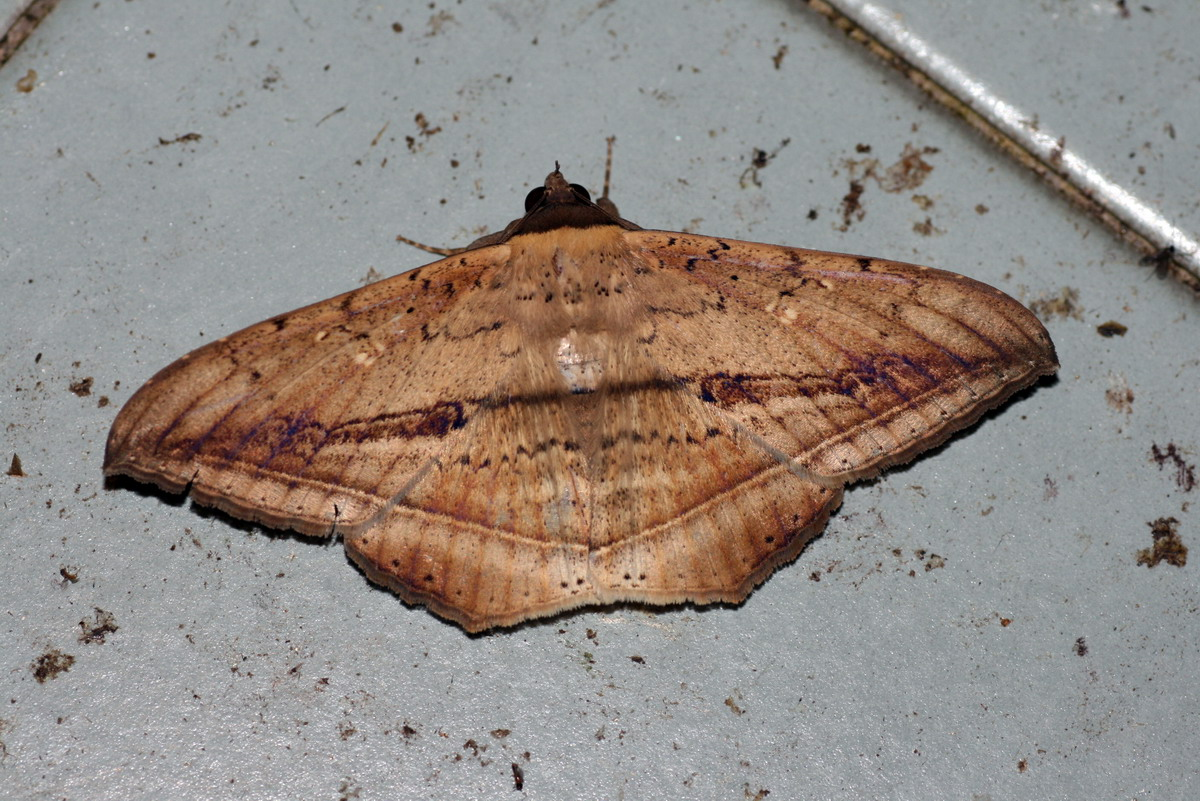

Scientific classification
- Domain: Eukaryota
- Kingdom: Animalia
- Phylum: Arthropoda
- Class: Insecta
- Order: Lepidoptera
- Superfamily: Noctuoidea
- Family: Erebidae
- Genus: Hulodes
- Species: H. donata

Binomial name
- Hulodes donata (Schultze, 1907)

Synonyms
- Hypopyra donata Schultze, 1907; Hulodes divisa Aurivillius, 1920; Hulodes hilaris Prout, 1921

= Hulodes donata =

Species of moth

Hulodes donata is a moth of the family Erebidae. It is found in the Indian subregion, Burma, Thailand, Sundaland, the Philippines, Sulawesi, New Guinea and Australia.

The larvae feed on Xylia species.
