= Hulodes solomonensis =

Scientific classification
- Kingdom: Animalia
- Phylum: Arthropoda
- Class: Insecta
- Order: Lepidoptera
- Superfamily: Noctuoidea
- Family: Erebidae
- Genus: Hulodes
- Species: H. solomonensis

Binomial name
- Hulodes solomonensis Hampson, 1926

Species of moth

Hulodes solomonensis is a species of moth of the family Erebidae. It is found on the Solomon Islands.
