= Kangyidaunt Township =

Kangyidaunt Township ကန်ကြီးတောင့်မြို့နယ်
- Township
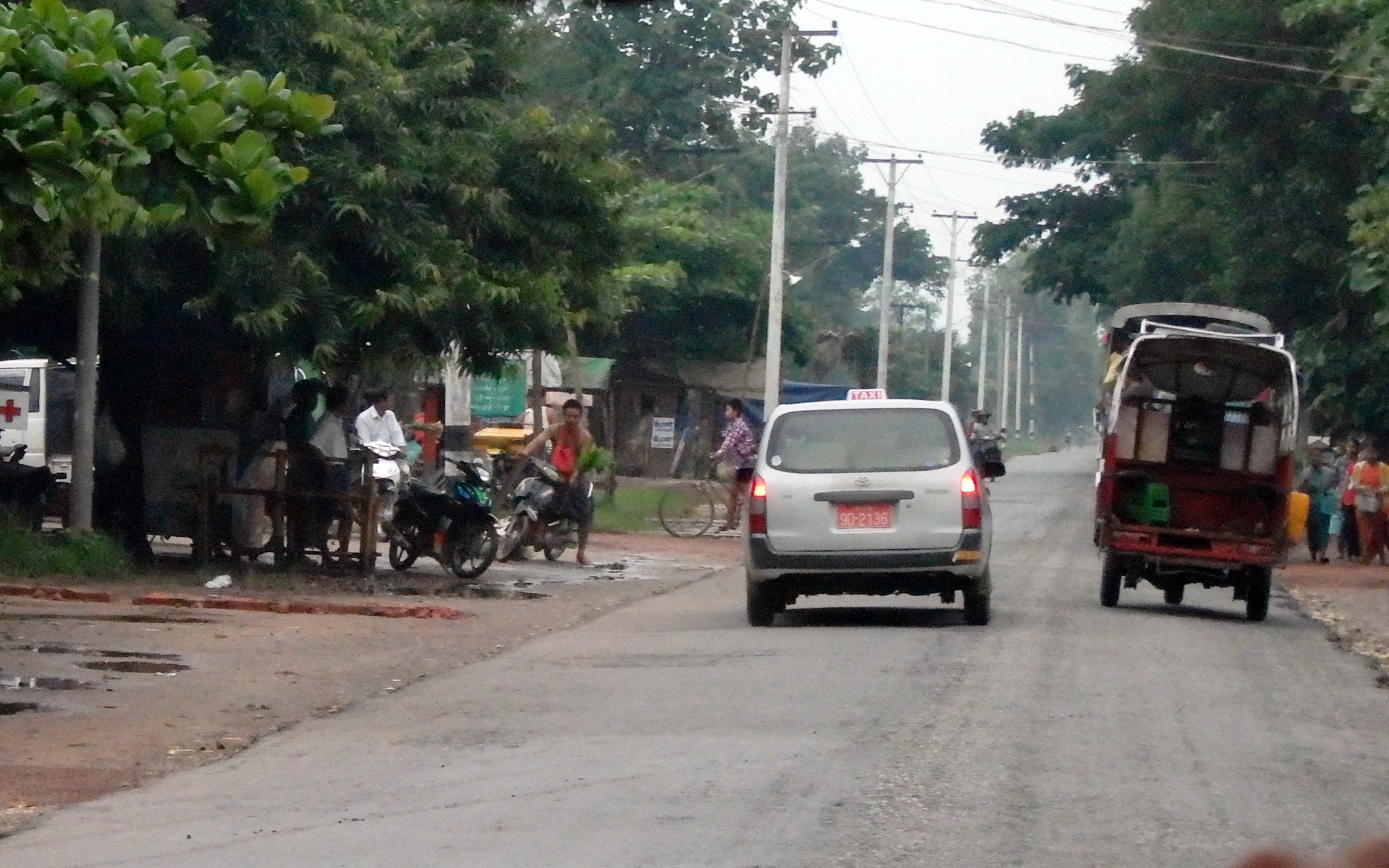
- The Yangon-Pathein Road going through Ta Kone Gyi village, western Kangyidaunt Township

- Location in Pathein district
- Coordinates: 16°56′N 94°53′E
- Country: Myanmar
- Region: Ayeyarwady Region
- District: Pathein District
- Capital: Kangyidaunt

Area
  - Total: 117.73 sq mi (304.92 km^{2})
- Elevation: 27 ft (8.2 m)

Population (2023)
  - Total: 186,229
  - Density: 1,581.8/sq mi (610.75/km^{2})
  - Ethnicities: Bamar Karen
- Time zone: UTC+6:30 (MMT)

Kangyidaunt Township (Burmese: ကန်ကြီးတောင့်မြို့နယ်) is a township of the Pathein District in the Ayeyarwady Division of Myanmar. It is located on the eastern edge of Pathein District, bordering the townships of Einme and Myaunmya in Myaungmya District. Within Pathein District, Kangyidaunt Township is bordered by Kyaunggon Township to the northeast, Thabaung Township to the north, Pathein Township to the west, and Ngapudaw Township to the southwest. Kangyidaunt Township consists of 1 town, 7 wards, 73 village tracts and 386 villages. The principal town is Kangyidaunt. It may also be spelled as Kangyidaung.

Kangyidaunt Township has a significant Karen minority at 43.68% of residents in 2019.

== Geography ==
Kangyidaunt Township is mostly flat and even, with only a few areas slightly higher than the general elevation due to the course of the rivers within the township. The North side of the township is bounded by the Daka River and the south is bound by the Panmawaddy and Ngawan Rivers. The township has many Lebbek trees and some Nipa Palms in saltwater estuaries. The township, with its abundance of navigable rivers and streams, sees many motorized boats during summer months.

The Township's Water Usage Planning department monitors and maintains rivers, streams and irrigation channels to prevent siltation. The Forestry department's nursery is growing 24,000 trees, including Eucalyptus, Forest Mangrove and Teak trees, to be planted in Kalarkwin and Seikthar villages to prevent erosion during the Monsoon Season.

Kangyidaunt Township typically sees 85.84 inches (218cm) of rainfall and has a moderate level of risk for flooding due to both nearby deltaic river systems and a lower population density compared to nearby Pathein.

== Demographics and Economy ==
Historical Population
Year	Kangyidaunt Township	±%
2014	177.99	—
2018	177,026	+99358.4%
2019	177,129	+0.1%
2022	189,722	+7.1%
2023	186,229	−1.8%
Source: Ministry of Labor, Immigration, and Population data, General Administration Department

Kangyidaunt Township is overwhelmingly rural with 93.9% of the population in 2019 (166,321 people) living outside of Kangyidaunt city. There are 1.71 women for every man in the township. 89.8% of residents are Buddhists, with the second most common religion being Christianity at 9.8%.

Agriculture is the primary industry of the Township with 140,308 acres (567.8 sq.km) of farmland. The main crop farmed is rice, with the primary markets being nearby Pathein, Myaungmya and the large city of Yangon further east. A few other crops like rubber, beans and pulse are also grown in much lower amounts. The main road toward Pathein from Yangon, Pathein Road, passes through the township and provides excellent transportation and communication to residents and businesses. Kangyidaunt Township also has several waterways that are regularly used for transportation, especially to rural communities. Many markets center locate themselves on rivers and streams with goods coming in by boat.

Industry in the township is limited, but exists in the form of a few factories creating ice, wood products, wigs and concrete. There are also many cottage industries and artisan workshops within the town, including woodworking shops. There is extremely limited bamboo forestry and no mining in the township.

== See also ==
- List of villages in Kangyidaunt Township
