= Hulodes ischnesthes =

Scientific classification
- Kingdom: Animalia
- Phylum: Arthropoda
- Clade: Pancrustacea
- Class: Insecta
- Order: Lepidoptera
- Superfamily: Noctuoidea
- Family: Erebidae
- Genus: Hulodes
- Species: H. ischnesthes

Binomial name
- Hulodes ischnesthes Prout, 1932

Species of moth

Hulodes ischnesthes is a species of moth of the family Erebidae. It is found in Indonesia (Buru) and New Guinea.
