= Xylia mendoncae =

Conservation status
- Vulnerable (IUCN 3.1)

Scientific classification
- Kingdom: Plantae
- Clade: Tracheophytes
- Clade: Angiosperms
- Clade: Eudicots
- Clade: Rosids
- Order: Fabales
- Family: Fabaceae
- Subfamily: Caesalpinioideae
- Clade: Mimosoid clade
- Genus: Xylia
- Species: X. mendoncae

Binomial name
- Xylia mendoncae Torre

Species of legume

Xylia mendoncae is a species of flowering plant in the family Fabaceae. It is found only in Mozambique.
