= Calventuras Islands =

- Islands
- Location within Myanmar
- Coordinates: 16°50′N 94°16′E
- Country: Myanmar
- Region: Ayeyarwady

Area
  - Total: 0.4 km^{2} (0.15 sq mi)
- Elevation: 24 m (79 ft)
- Time zone: UTC+6:30 (Myanmar Standard Time)

The Calventuras Islands are a small group of islands off the coast of Ayeyarwady Region, Burma.

== Geography ==
The Calventuras Islands are located about 9 km (6 mi) to the west of Broken Point, a headland north of Ngwesaung.

- The northern island is 0.5 km (0.3 mi) long and 0.2 km (0.1 mi) wide and has a white beach and a detached reef on its western side. Its highest point is 24 metres (79 ft).
- The southern group is a cluster of islets located 3.5 km (2.2 mi) to the south of the northern island. The main islet is 0.6 km (0.4 mi) long and 0.3 km (0.2 mi) wide. It has two smaller islets off its northern end. It rises to a height of 22 metres (72 ft) and is thickly wooded.

== See also ==
- List of islands of Burma
