= Ngwesaung =

Ngwesaung ငွေဆောင်
- Town
- Ngwe Hsaung
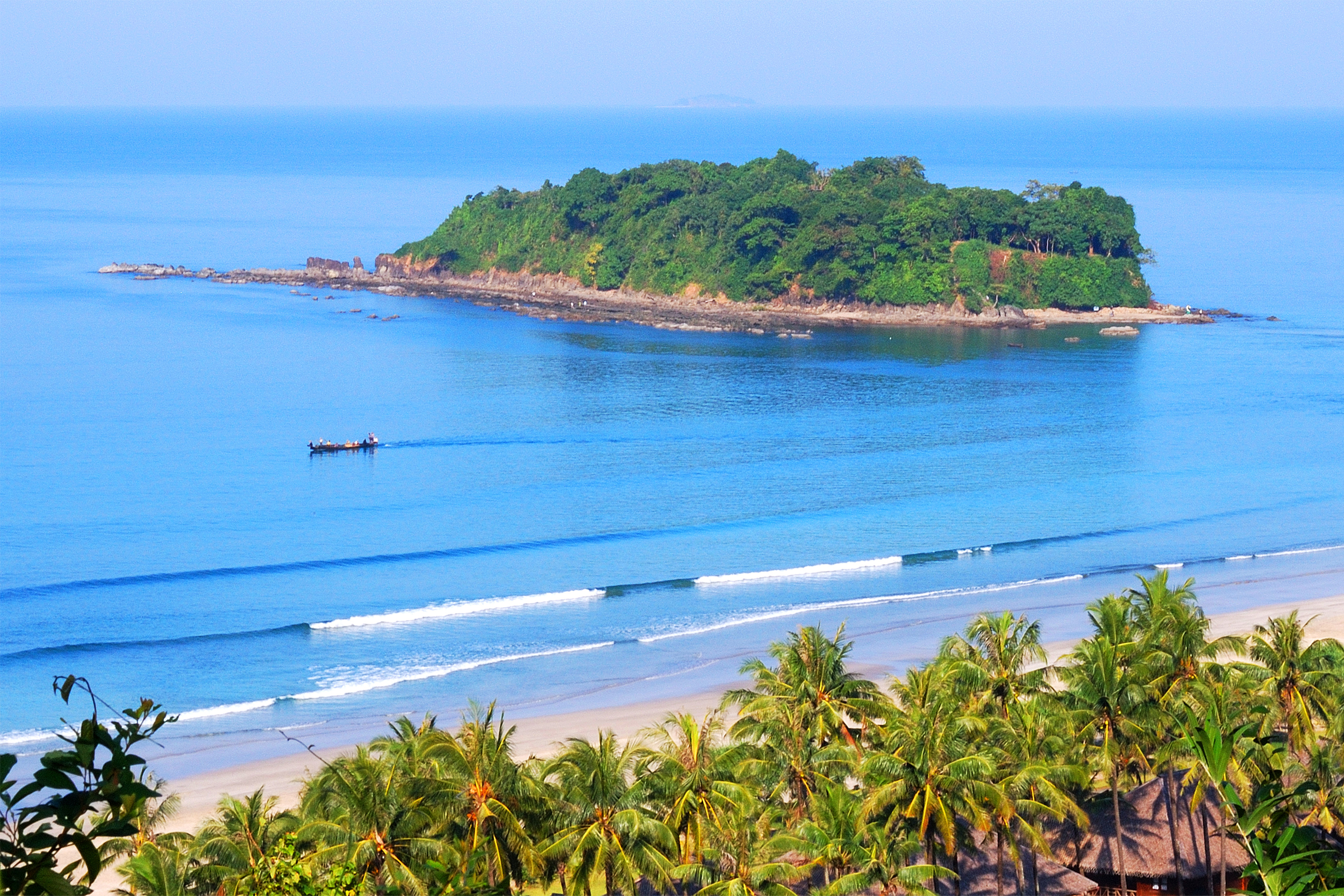

- Location within Myanmar
- Coordinates: 16°51′30″N 94°23′30″E
- Country: Myanmar
- Region: Ayeyarwady
- District: Pathein District
- Township: Pathein Township
- Subtownship: Ngwesaung
- Town: Ngwesaung
- Settled: 2000

Area
  - Total: 3.69 sq mi (9.56 km^{2})
- Elevation: 12.0 ft (3.66 m)

Population (2014)
  - Total: 10,732
  - Density: 2,910/sq mi (1,120/km^{2})
- Time zone: UTC6:30 (MST)

Ngwesaung (Burmese: ငွေဆောင် [ŋwè zàʊɰ̃]), also spelt Ngwe Hsaung, is a beach resort located 48 km west of Pathein, Ayeyarwady Region, Myanmar. It is the namesake of Ngwesaung Subtownship, Pathein Township. In 2014, the town of Ngwesaung had 10,732 people. The beach is a minimum of five hours drive away from the principal city of Yangon, and an airport is in the works. Buses leave at 6am & 9:30pm from in front of the Yangon Central Railway Station. Opened in March 2000, Ngwe Hsaung is newer than nearby and more popular Chaung Thar Beach, and is designed to attract people with larger holiday budgets.

== Tourism ==
An unspoilt 15 kilometres (9.3 mi) stretch of silvery sand and modern amenities have made Ngwe Hsaung a popular destination for less budget conscious tourists from Lower Myanmar. Still Ngwe Hsaung has much to develop. Its choices for nightlife activities remain paltry, even by local standards. Chaung Thar and Ngapali beaches have greater choices of nighttime activities. At this point, a nearby elephant training camp is a main daytime attraction at Ngwe Hsaung.

The Calventuras Islands are a group of islets lying about 9 km to the west of Broken Point.

== Sport ==
As part of the 2013 SEA Games, Ngwe Hsaung hosted the sailing competition. Sithu Moe Myint (Helms) and Phone Kyaw Moe Mying (Crew) won the gold medal in the Half Rater Class.
