= Pathein Township =

Township in Ayeyarwady Region, Myanmar

Pathein Township ပုသိမ်မြို့နယ်
- Township
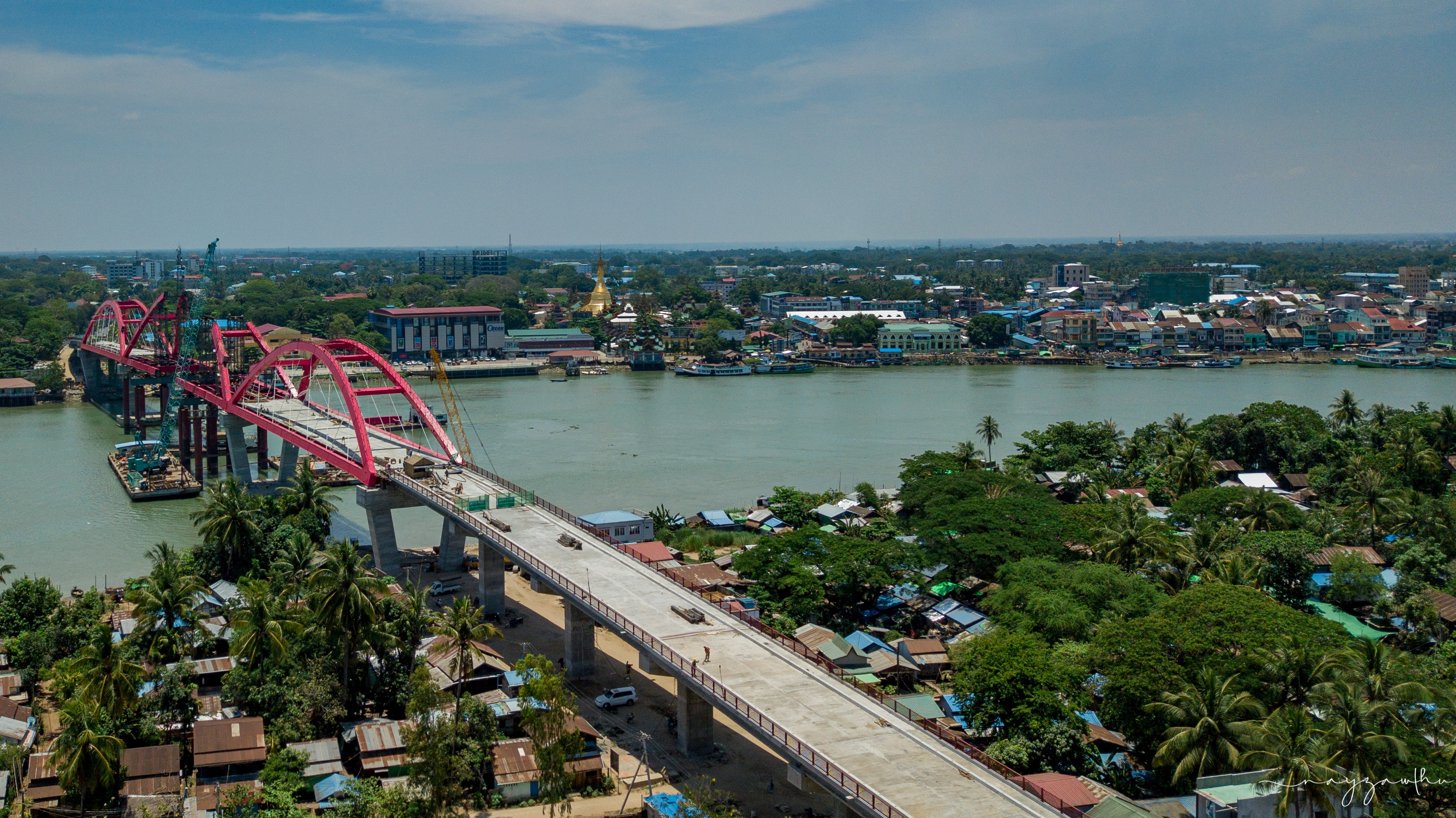
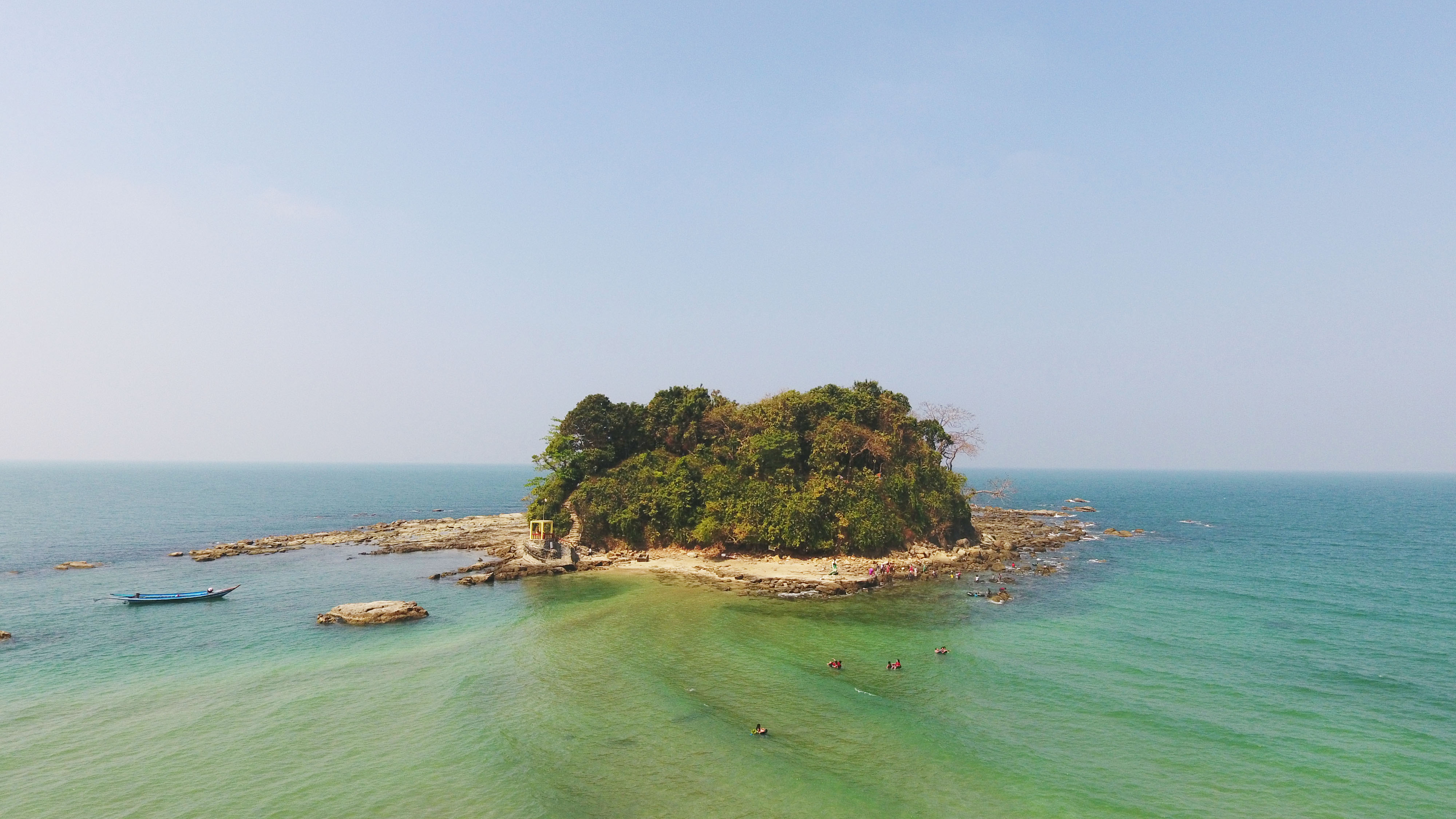
- Top: View of Pathein City. Bottom: Chithumyar Island, Ngwesaung

- Location in Pathein district
- Coordinates: 16°46′N 94°43′E
- Country: Myanmar
- Region: Ayeyarwady Region
- District: Pathein District
- Capital: Pathein

Area
  - Total: 644.88 sq mi (1,670.23 km^{2})
- Elevation: 27 ft (8.3 m)

Population (2023)
  - Total: 364,369
  - Density: 565.019/sq mi (218.155/km^{2})
  - Ethnicities: Bamar; Karen; Rakhine
- Time zone: UTC+6:30 (MMT)

Pathein Township is a township of Pathein District in the Ayeyawady Region of Myanmar. The administrative seat of the Township, District and Region is Pathein. The city of Pathein is the largest city in the Region and has historically been an important center of trade, including a deepwater port.

Pathein Township is located in west-central Ayeyarwady Region and in the central part of Pathein District. The Township includes Ngwesaung Subtownship and Shwethaungyan Subtownship, both unofficial divisions used by the Township for statistical and administrative ease. Shwethaungyan subtownship spans the border between Pathein Township and Thabaung Township to its north. To its east, it borders Kangyidaunt Township and to its south it borders Ngapudaw Township. The Bay of Bengal forms the Township's western shore.

== Communities ==
The Township is divided into 1 city and 4 towns, 25 urban wards, 54 village tracts and 285 villages. It separately contains two subtownships.

Pathein is the main city of the Township and is located on the Pathein River and had a population of 190,560 in 2019. The area of Pathein township outside of the two subtownships, sometimes called the "Town of Pathein" was 287,071 in 2014.

The Town has two subtownships. The town of Ngwesaung lies within Ngwesaung Subtownship on the coast, is divided into 4 wards. Within Shwethaungyan Subtownship, there are two towns- Shwethaungyan and Chaungtha each divided into 3 wards. Ngwesaung and Chaungtha are both beach resorts serving mostly tourists from Yangon and Pathein.

== Geography ==
Pathein Township is located in the Irrawaddy Delta, spans over the southern edges of the Arakan Mountains and includes a significant coastline with the Bay of Bengal. Most of the Townships is low-lying delta plains. Steep forested mountains characterize the western quarter of the township starting 12 miles west of the Pathein River. The Township has 8 islands, mostly in the vicinity of Ngwesaung and Chaungtha beaches.

The Ngawun, Pathein and Thandwe Rivers are the most major waterways of the township. Besides major rivers, the Township contains 328 smaller streams. The highest peak within the township is Mount Kyarlay at an elevation of 844 feet (257 m). Pathein Township is located in a mountainous tropical zone with a heavy monsoon presence, seeing 129 days of rain in an average year. Average highs and lows range between 40.7°C and 15.0°C with lows mostly in the Arakan Mountains.

The western part of the township is largely undeveloped and is home to a diverse variety of flora and fauna. The 39 primary tree species identified by the township include trees include hardwoods like teak and Burmese ironwood, fruit trees like mango and tamarind as well as coastal trees like Coconut trees. Prominent animals in the township include elephants, gaur, black bears, iguana, water buffalo, deer, hog badgers and many more.

== Economy ==
As the administrative capital of the Region, Pathein Township enjoys both political and economic prominence with strong infrastructure for trade on land and water. However, the primary industry of the township is agriculture. The primary crop is rice, with the largest export market being Yangon Region and Upper Burma. Other crops include fruits like bananas and coconuts. The animal husbandry industry in the township is growing with many goat herders shifting into pork, poultry or dairy. The township also has a sizeable fishing industry as well as fish hatcheries and fish farms. 27.4% of the township is wildlife preserve or undeveloped lands, mostly in the west.

The primary produce of Pathein's industrial sector is fabrics and textiles within the Pathein Industrial Zone. Beyond the textile industry, there are many traditional artisan workshops like hand-made buckets and the iconic Pathein parasols. Rice milling and charcoal production are other traditional industry present in the Pathein city area. The Township has one airport - Pathein Airport and a major rail terminal at the end of four intercity railroads.

== Demographics ==
Historical Population
Year	Pathein Township	±%
1973		—
1983		—
2014	287,071	—
2018	339,015	+18.1%
2019	339,212	+0.1%
2022	366,160	+7.9%
2023	364,369	−0.5%
Source: Ministry of Labor, Immigration, and Population data, General Administration Department

Pathein Township has two distinct characteristic demography with an urban and suburban deltaic east and a much more rural mountainous west. 51% of the overall Township lives within a city or town, with 58% of the population in the East living in the City of Pathein. The most common religion is Buddhism at 86.9% with Christianity second at 10.8%. There are 76,575 households; the mean household size was 4.4 people. The median age was 24.5 years, and 93 males per 100 females.
