= Hulodes gravata =

Scientific classification
- Kingdom: Animalia
- Phylum: Arthropoda
- Clade: Pancrustacea
- Class: Insecta
- Order: Lepidoptera
- Superfamily: Noctuoidea
- Family: Erebidae
- Genus: Hulodes
- Species: H. gravata

Binomial name
- Hulodes gravata Prout, 1932

Synonyms
- Hulodes seranensis Prout, 1932

Species of moth

Hulodes gravata is a species of moth of the family Erebidae. It is found in Indonesia (Irian Jaya, Seram) and New Guinea.

== Subspecies ==
- Hulodes gravata gravata
- Hulodes gravata seranensis Prout, 1932 (Seram)
