= Kangyidaunt =

Kangyidaut ကန်ကြီးတောင့်မြို့
- Town
- Location in Myanmar
- Coordinates: 16.932903°N 94.89476°E
- Country: Myanmar
- Region: Ayeyarwady Region
- District: Pathein District
- Township: Kangyidaunt Township

Area
  - Total: 6.38 sq mi (16.52 km^{2})

Population (2023)
  - Total: 11,659
  - Density: 1,828/sq mi (705.8/km^{2})
- Time zone: UTC+6:30 (MST)

Kangyidaunt (Burmese: ကန်ကြီးတောင့်မြို့) is a town in the Ayeyarwady Region, Myanmar. It is the seat of the Kangyidaunt Township in the Pathein District.
