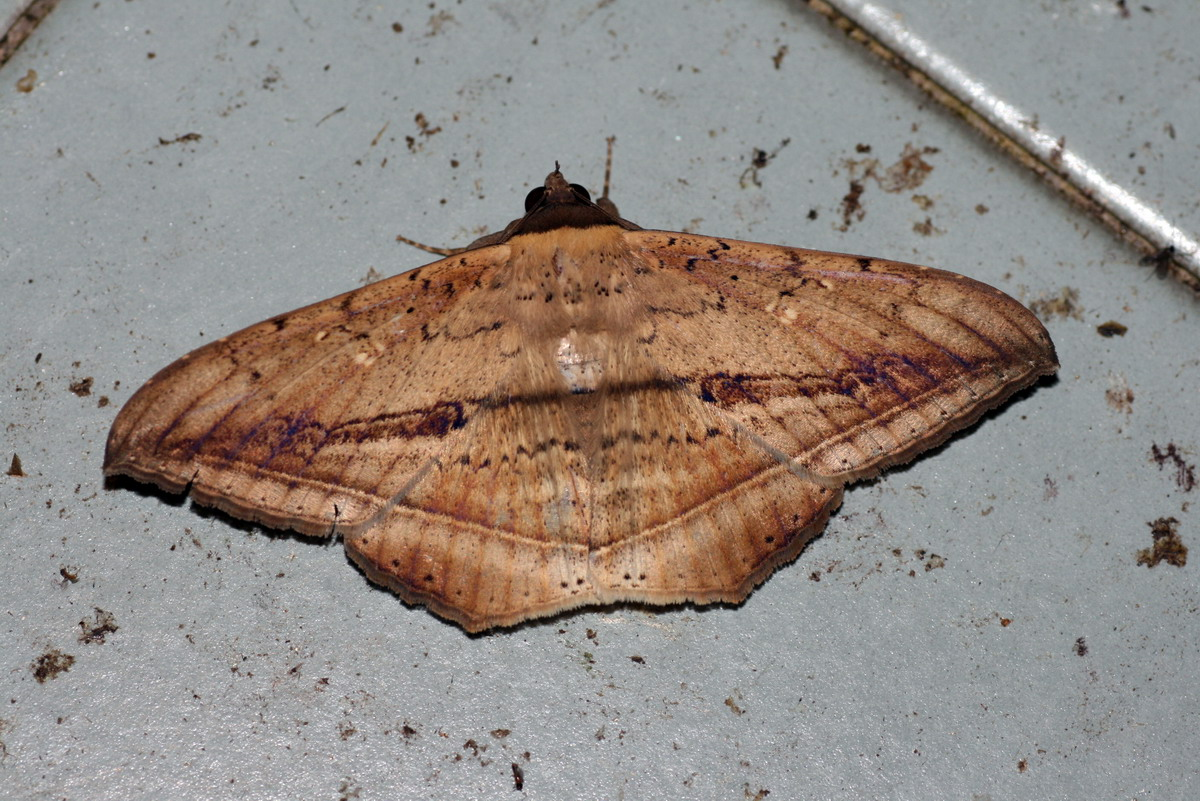

Scientific classification
- Kingdom: Animalia
- Phylum: Arthropoda
- Class: Insecta
- Order: Lepidoptera
- Superfamily: Noctuoidea
- Family: Erebidae
- Tribe: Hulodini
- Genus: Hulodes; Guenée in Boisduval & Guenée, 1852

Synonyms
- Hylodes Hampson, 1894

= Hulodes =

Genus of moths

Hulodes is a genus of moths in the family Erebidae first described by Achille Guenée in 1852.

== Description ==
Palpi with second joint reaching vertex of head, and third joint minute in male and moderate length in female. Antennae simple. Thorax and abdomen clothed with coarse hair. Tibia spineless. Male with tibia, first tarsal joint of mid-legs and all joints of hindlegs are fringed with long hair. Forewings with arched costa towards apex, which is somewhat falcate. Hindwings with short cell. Vein 5 from close to lower angle. Larva with four pairs of abdominal prolegs, where the first pair rudimentary.

== Species ==
- Hulodes caranea Cramer, [1780]
- Hulodes donata Schultze, 1907
- Hulodes drylla Guenée, 1852
- Hulodes gravata Prout, 1932
- Hulodes ischnesthes Prout, 1932
- Hulodes saturnioides Guenée, 1852
- Hulodes solomonensis Hampson, 1926

== Former species ==
- Hulodes angulata Prout, 1928
- Hulodes fusifascia (Walker, 1869)
- Hulodes hilaris Prout, 1921
