= Hulodes saturnioides =

Scientific classification
- Kingdom: Animalia
- Phylum: Arthropoda
- Class: Insecta
- Order: Lepidoptera
- Superfamily: Noctuoidea
- Family: Erebidae
- Genus: Hulodes
- Species: H. saturnioides

Binomial name
- Hulodes saturnioides Guenée, 1852

Synonyms
- Hypopyra restorans Walker, 1858

Species of moth

Hulodes saturnioides is a moth of the family Erebidae. It is found in India.
