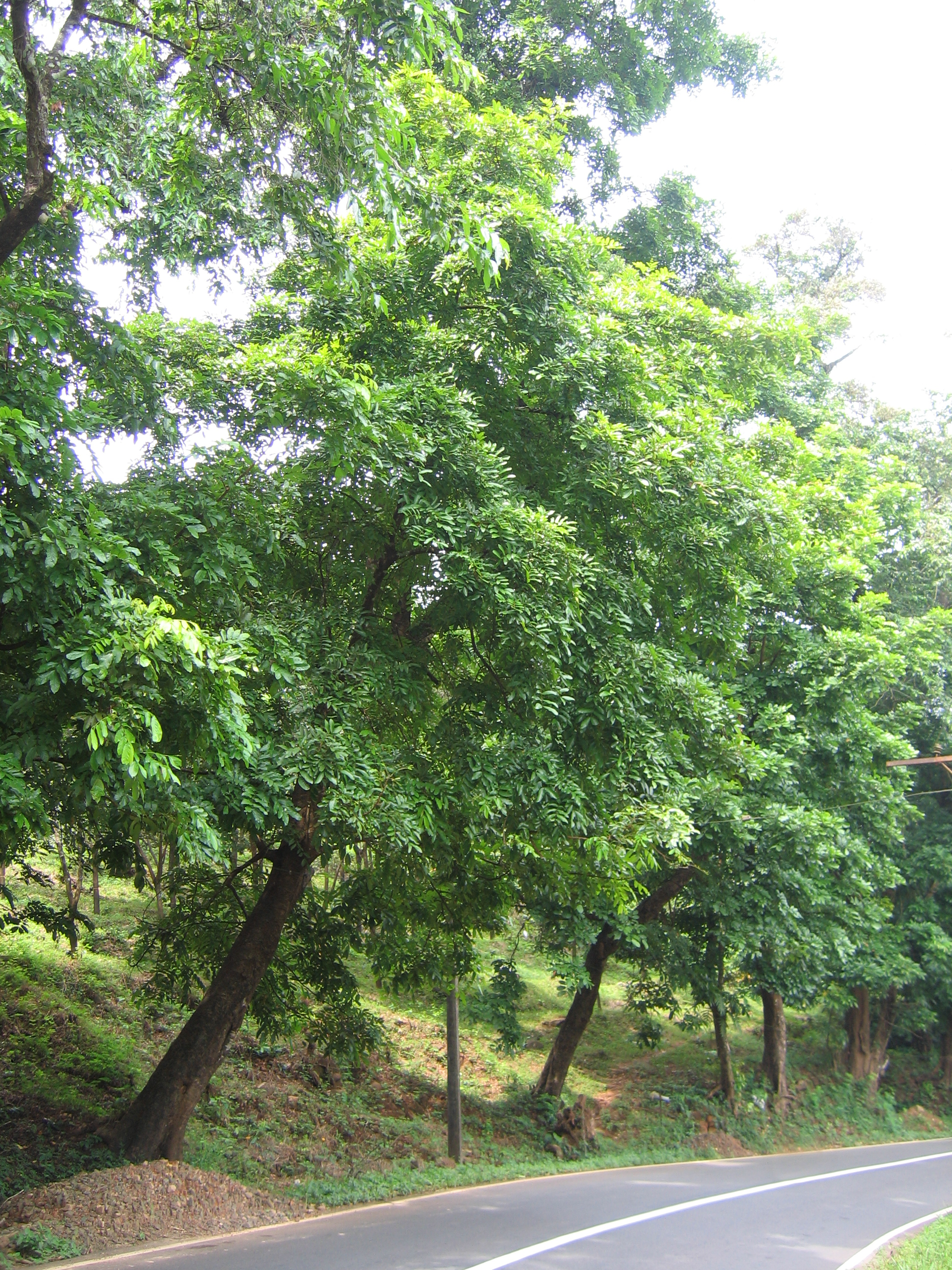
- Xylia xylocarpa from Kerala

Scientific classification
- Kingdom: Plantae
- Clade: Tracheophytes
- Clade: Angiosperms
- Clade: Eudicots
- Clade: Rosids
- Order: Fabales
- Family: Fabaceae
- Subfamily: Caesalpinioideae
- Clade: Mimosoid clade
- Genus: Xylia; Benth.

Species
- See text

Synonyms
- Xylolobus Kuntze

= Xylia =

Genus of legumes

Xylia is a genus of flowering plants in the family Fabaceae. It is native to Sub-Saharan Africa, South Asia, and Mainland Southeast Asia.

== Species ==
Xylia includes nine accepted species:

- Xylia africana Harms
- Xylia evansii Hutch.
- Xylia fraterna (Vatke) Drake
- Xylia ghesquierei Robyns
- Xylia hoffmannii (Vatke) Drake
- Xylia mendoncae Torre (found in Mozambique)
- Xylia schliebenii Harms
- Xylia torreana Brenan (found in Malawi, Mozambique, South Africa, and Zimbabwe)
- Xylia xylocarpa (Roxb.) Taub. (found in Indochina)

And one unresolved species:

- Xylia perieri Drake
