= Pathein District =

Pathein District ပုသိမ်ခရိုင်
- District of Ayeyarwady Division
- location in Ayeyarwady region

- Location within Myanmar
- Coordinates: 16°45′0″N 94°30′0″E
- Country: Myanmar
- Division: Ayeyarwady
- District: Pathein

Area
  - Total: 10,899.8 sq mi (28,230 km^{2})

Population (2014)
  - Total: 1,630,716
  - Density: 149.610/sq mi (57.7646/km^{2})
- Time zone: UTC6:30 (MST)

Pathein District (Burmese: ပုသိမ်ခရိုင်) is a district of Ayeyawady Division, Myanmar. It is located around and includes the urban area of the city of Pathein. The area of the Pathein District is 10,899.8 km^{2} (4,208.4 sq mi). Its population was 1,630,716 in 2014.

== Townships ==
Map of Pathein District

The district consists of the following townships:

- Kangyidaunt Township
- Ngapudaw Township
- Pathein Township
- Thabaung Township

The district contains four subtownships:

- Hainggyikyun Subtownship in Ngapudaw Township
- Ngayokaung Subtownship in Ngapudaw Township
- Ngwesaung Subtownship in Pathein Township
- Shwethaungyan Subtownship spanning Pathein Township and Thabaung Township

== Towns ==
The district contains 12 towns:

- Pathein
- Kangyidaunt
- Thabaung
- Kyonpyaw
- Yekyi
- Ngathaingchaung
- Kyaunggon
- Ngapudaw
- Ngwesaung
- Chaungtha

It contains 48 wards, 519 village groups and 2963 villages.
