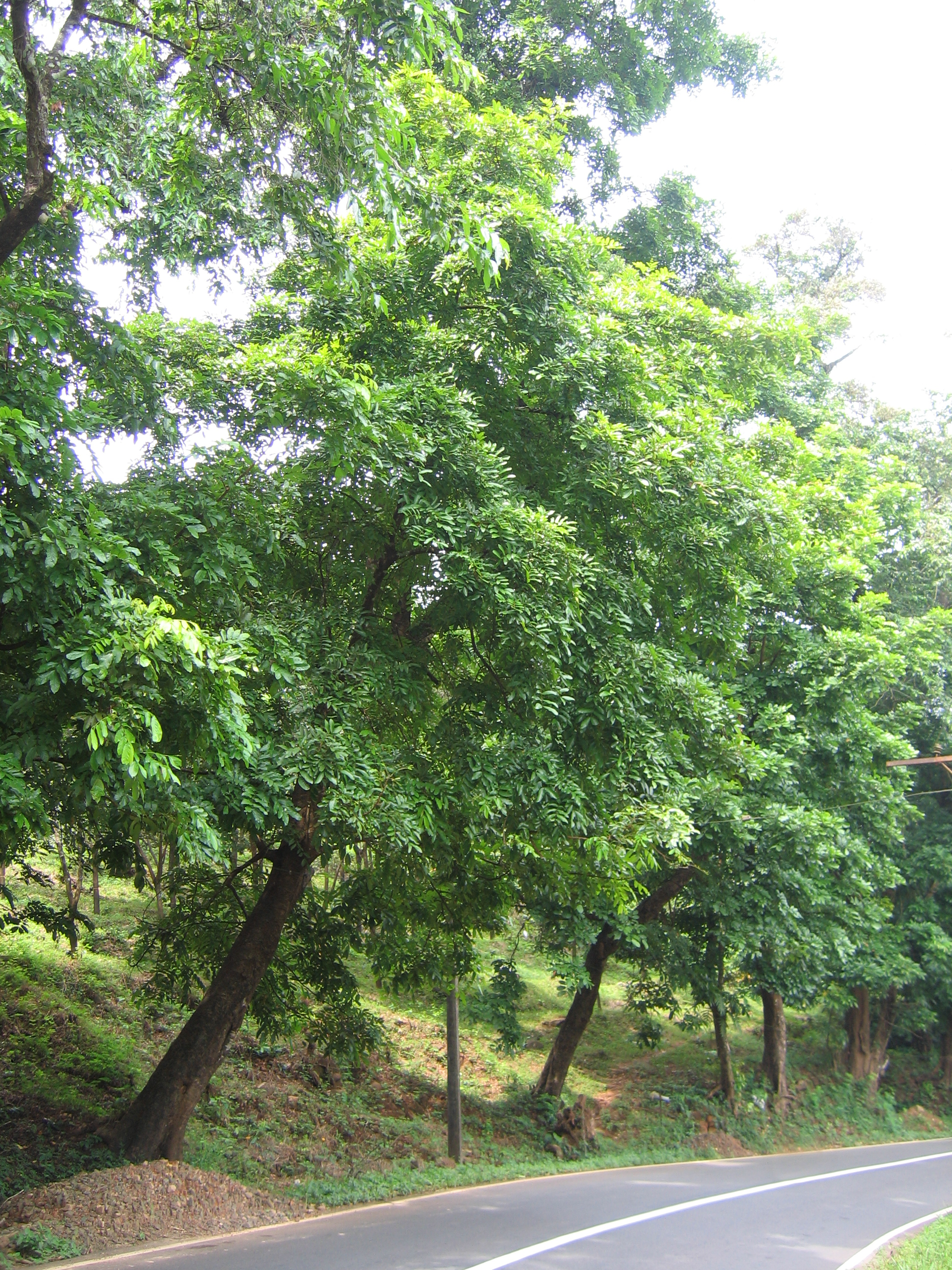

Conservation status
- Least Concern (IUCN 3.1)

Scientific classification
- Kingdom: Plantae
- Clade: Tracheophytes
- Clade: Angiosperms
- Clade: Eudicots
- Clade: Rosids
- Order: Fabales
- Family: Fabaceae
- Subfamily: Caesalpinioideae
- Clade: Mimosoid clade
- Genus: Xylia
- Species: X. xylocarpa

Binomial name
- Xylia xylocarpa Roxb. Taub.

Synonyms
- Mimosa xylocarpa Roxb.; Xylia kerrii; Xylia dolabriformis Benth.

= Xylia xylocarpa =

Species of legume

Xylia xylocarpa is a species of tree in the mimosoid clade of the subfamily Caesalpinioideae of the family Fabaceae.

== Description and properties ==
This perennial tree is very conspicuous in the flowering season owing to its bright yellow flowers.

Xylia xylocarpa produces hardwood, and in Vietnam it is classified as an 'ironwood' with its name referring to use in traditional cart-making. The cross-section of a trunk has a distinctive yellowish-white and thick outer layer, with a crimson-dark core of fine grain and high density (1.15 with 15% moisture content). The wood pulp may be used for making wrapping paper.

The seeds of this tree are edible. This tree is considered a medicinal plant in India. In Thailand its leaves are used to treat wounds in elephants.

== Distribution and common names ==
This tree is found in South and Southeast Asia; it is known as Pyinkado (Burmese: ပျဉ်းကတိုး) in Myanmar, Căm xe in Vietnam, Sokram (សុក្រំ) in Cambodia, Konda-tangedu or Erra-chinnangi in Andhra and Telangana, Jamba or Jambe in Karnataka and Maharashtra, and Kangada in Odisha. It has also been planted in certain parts of East Africa.

Xylia xylocarpa (Roxb.) Taub. var. kerrii (Craib & Hutch.) is known as แดง (daeng lit. 'red') in the Thai language. This species, naturally adapted to conditions in Thailand, is used in reforestation at certain denuded or environmentally degraded areas of the country.

== Gallery ==
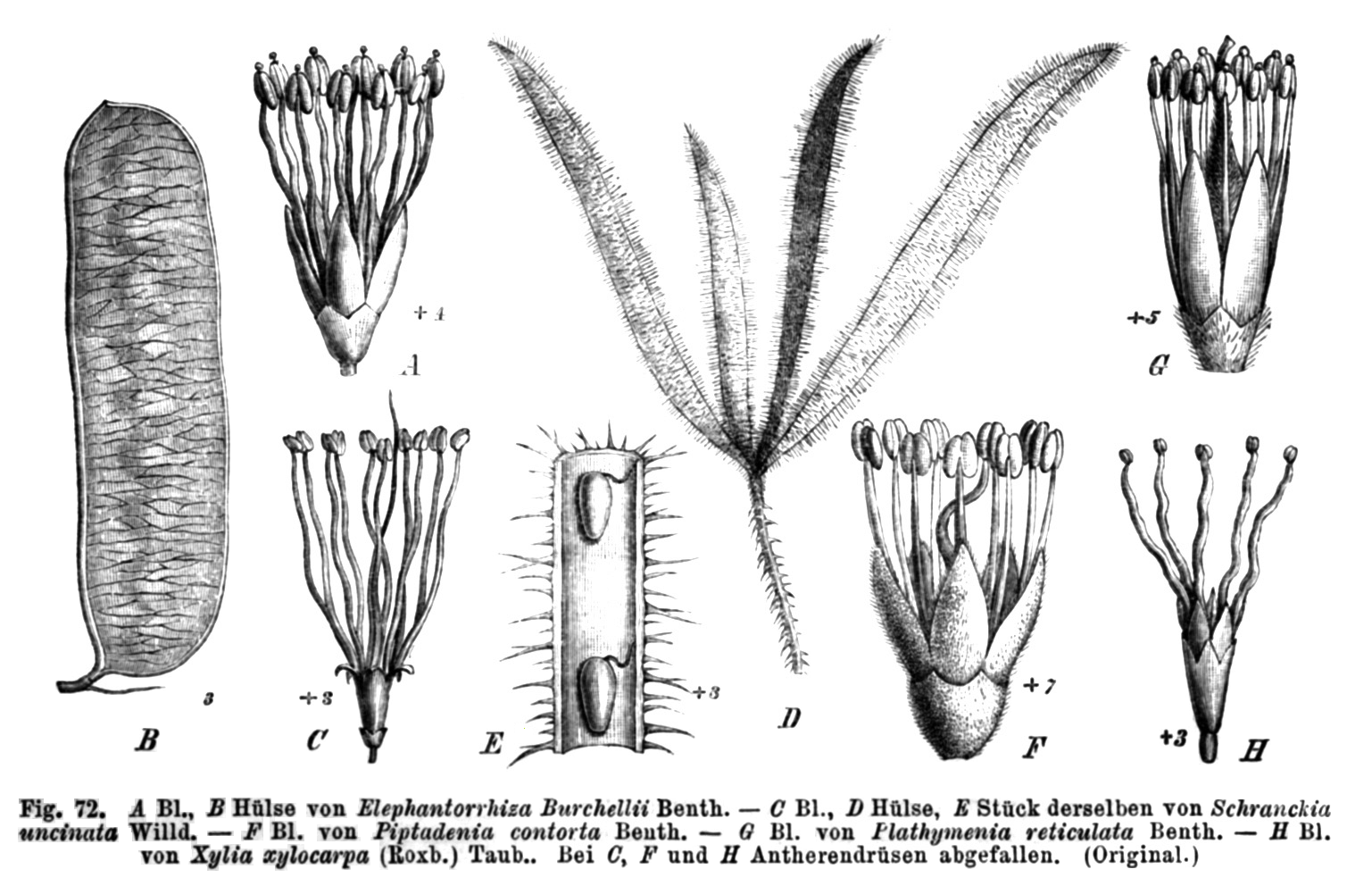
Xylia xylocarpa inflorescence on the lower right

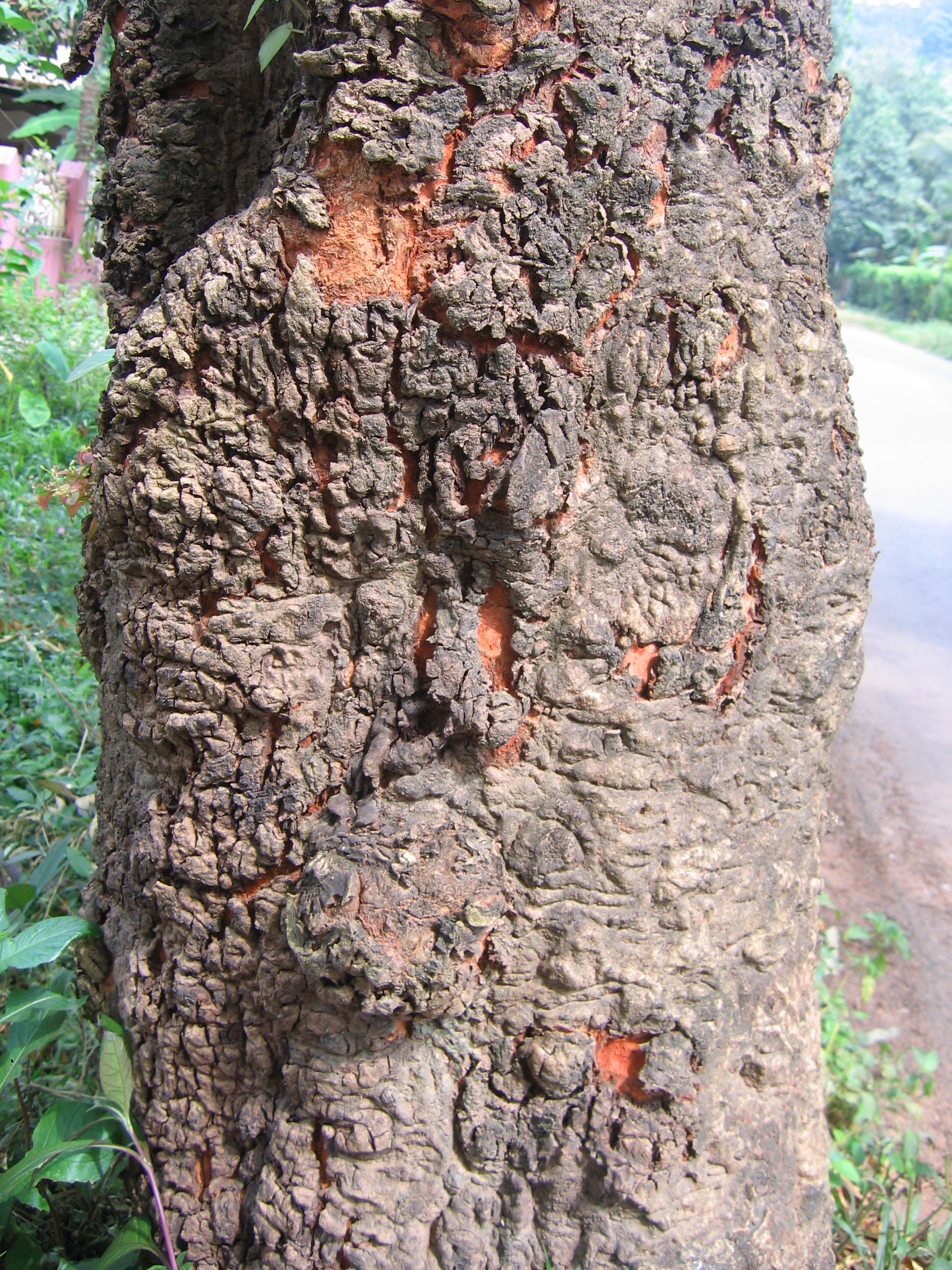
Bark

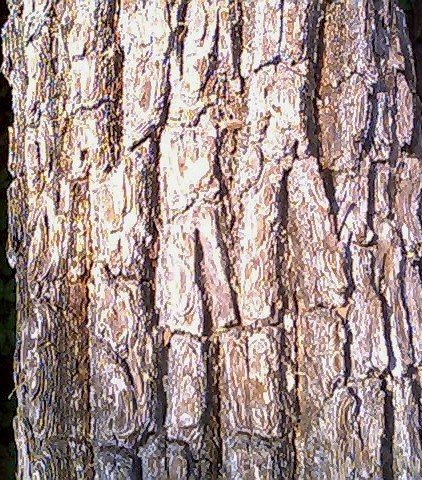
Bark closeup

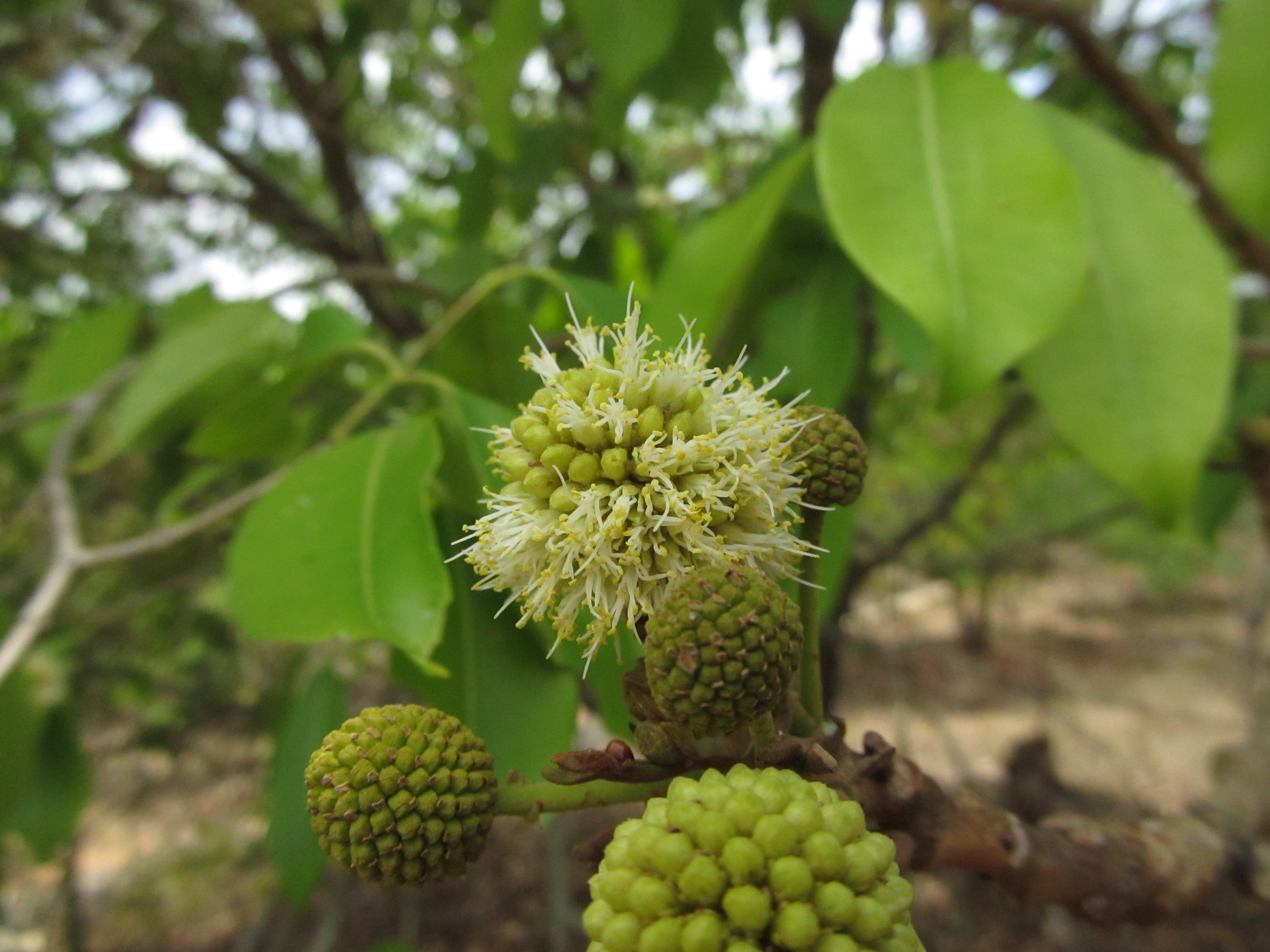
Flowers
