= Maha Thiri Thudhamma =

Military award

Maha Thiri Thudhamma Thingaha
- Insignia of the Order of Thudhamma Thingaha with neck ribbon

Awarded by President of Myanmar
- Type: Thiri Thudhamma Thingaha
- Established: 2.9.1948
- Country: Myanmar
- Ribbon

Precedence
- Next (higher): Sado Thiri Thudhamma
- Next (lower): Pyidaungsu Sithu Thingaha
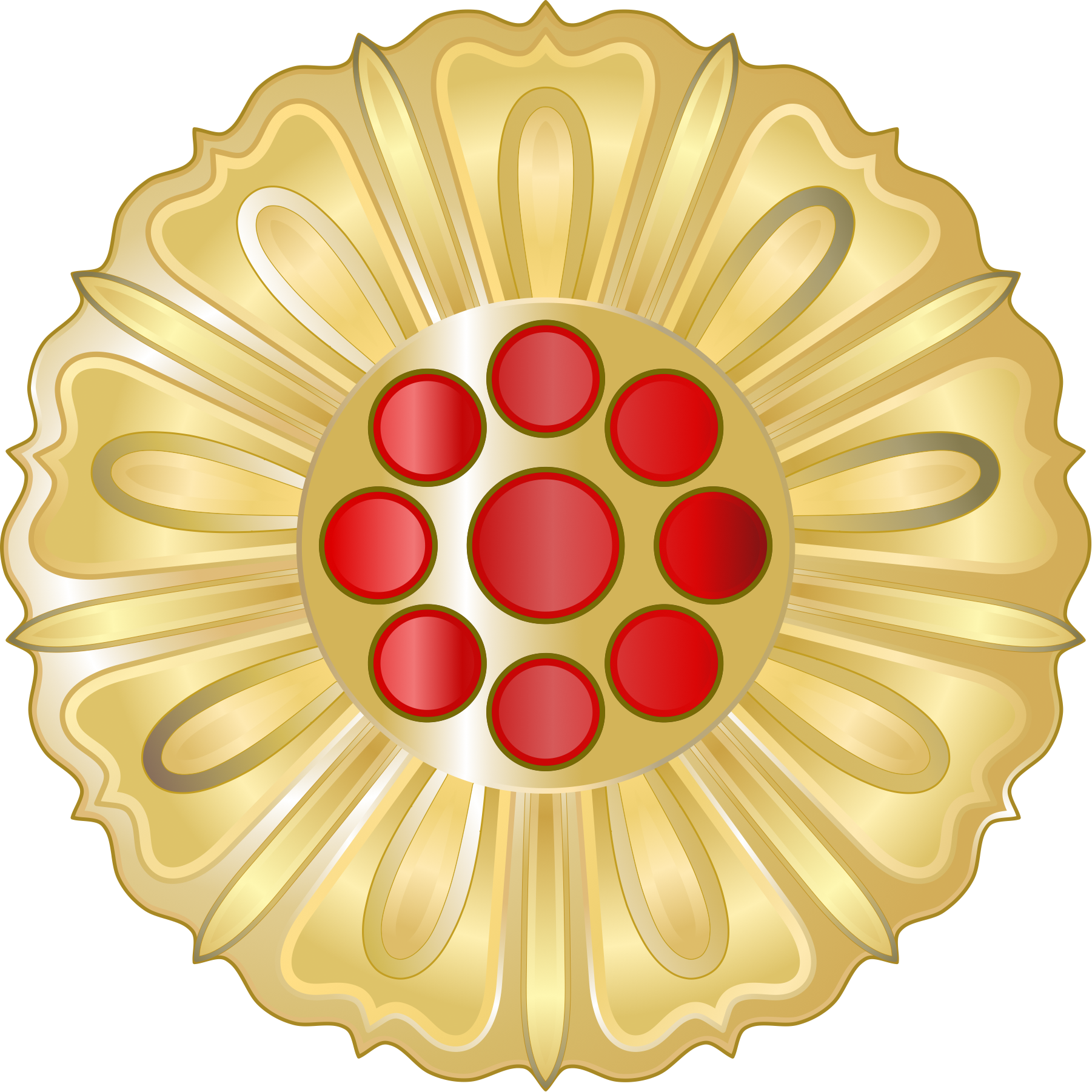
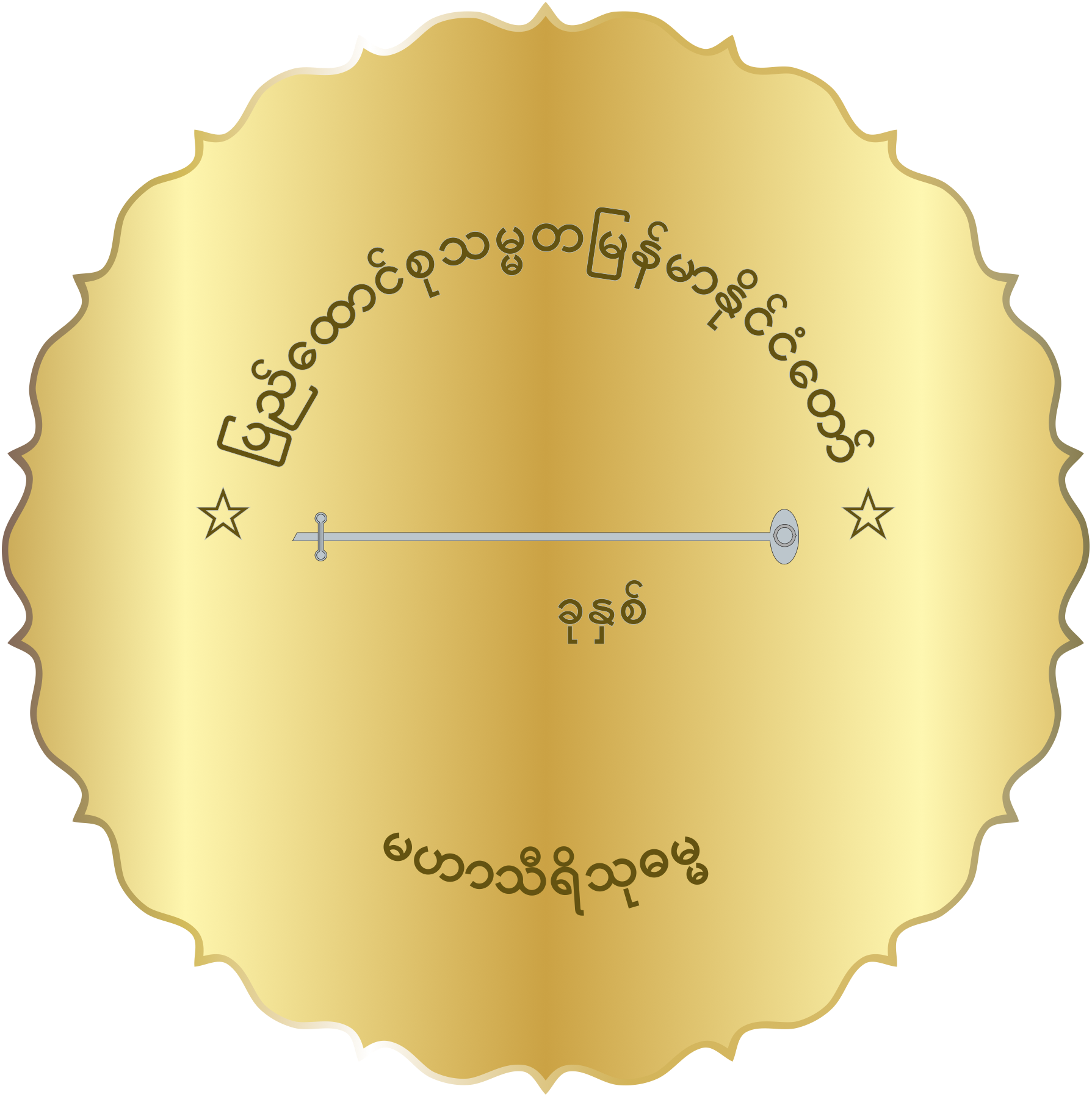
- Front and Back; Insignia of the Order of Thudhamma Thingaha (The ribbons’ color and design of all three grades are same and just different in gold’s weight and gems’ size.)

The Maha Thiri Thudhamma (Burmese: မဟာသီရိသုဓမ္မ, from Pali: mahāsīrisudhammā) is an honorary award given to those who have served in the military or the civil service of Myanmar since its 1948 independence. In the past, this title was given to the President, Chief Justice; Speaker of the Hluttaw, the Commander-in-Chief and Ministers. One of the first women to win the title in Myanmar was Khin Kyi, who obtained it in 1951.

== List of Maha Thiri Thudhamma recipients ==
- Daw Khin Kyi – a Burmese politician and diplomat, best known for her marriage to the country's leader, Aung San. They have four children, including Aung San Suu Kyi. She was born in Myaungmya, an Irrawaddy Delta town, on 16 April 1912.
- Gen. Ne Win – a Burmese politician and military commander who served as Prime Minister of Burma.
- Saw Kyar Doe
- President U Ba U
- Bo Let Ya – a Burmese military officer and a member of the legendary Thirty Comrades.

== See also ==
- Thiri Thudhamma Thingaha
- Pyidaungsu Sithu Thingaha
- Salwe
