= Kyaw Win (disambiguation) =

Kyaw Win may refer to:

- Kyaw Win (politician) (born 1948), Burmese politician and former minister for planning and finance of Myanmar
- Kyaw Win (general) (born 1944), Burmese military officer
- Kyaw Win (actor), Burmese actor
- Manutha Kyaw Win, Burmese writer
- Kyaw Khing Win (born 1983), Burmese football defender
- Kyaw Kyaw Win (born 1978), Burmese politician and lawyer
- Kyaw Zayar Win (born 1991), Burmese football midfielder
