= Thiri Thudhamma Thingaha =

Burmese order and title

Most Glorious Order of Truth (Thudhamma Thingaha)
- Insignia of the Order of Thudhamma Thingaha with neck ribbon (Note: The ribbons’ color and design of all three grades are same and just different in gold’s weight and gems’ size.)

Awarded by President of Myanmar
- Type: Order
- Established: 2 September 1948
- Country: Myanmar
- Ribbon: (Note: Design of neck ribbons and service ribbons of all three grades are same.)
- Grades: 1. Agga Mahar Thiri Thudhamma; 2. Sado Thiri Thudhamma; 3. Maha Thiri Thudhamma

Precedence
- Next (higher): None
- Next (lower): Pyidaungsu Sithu Thingaha
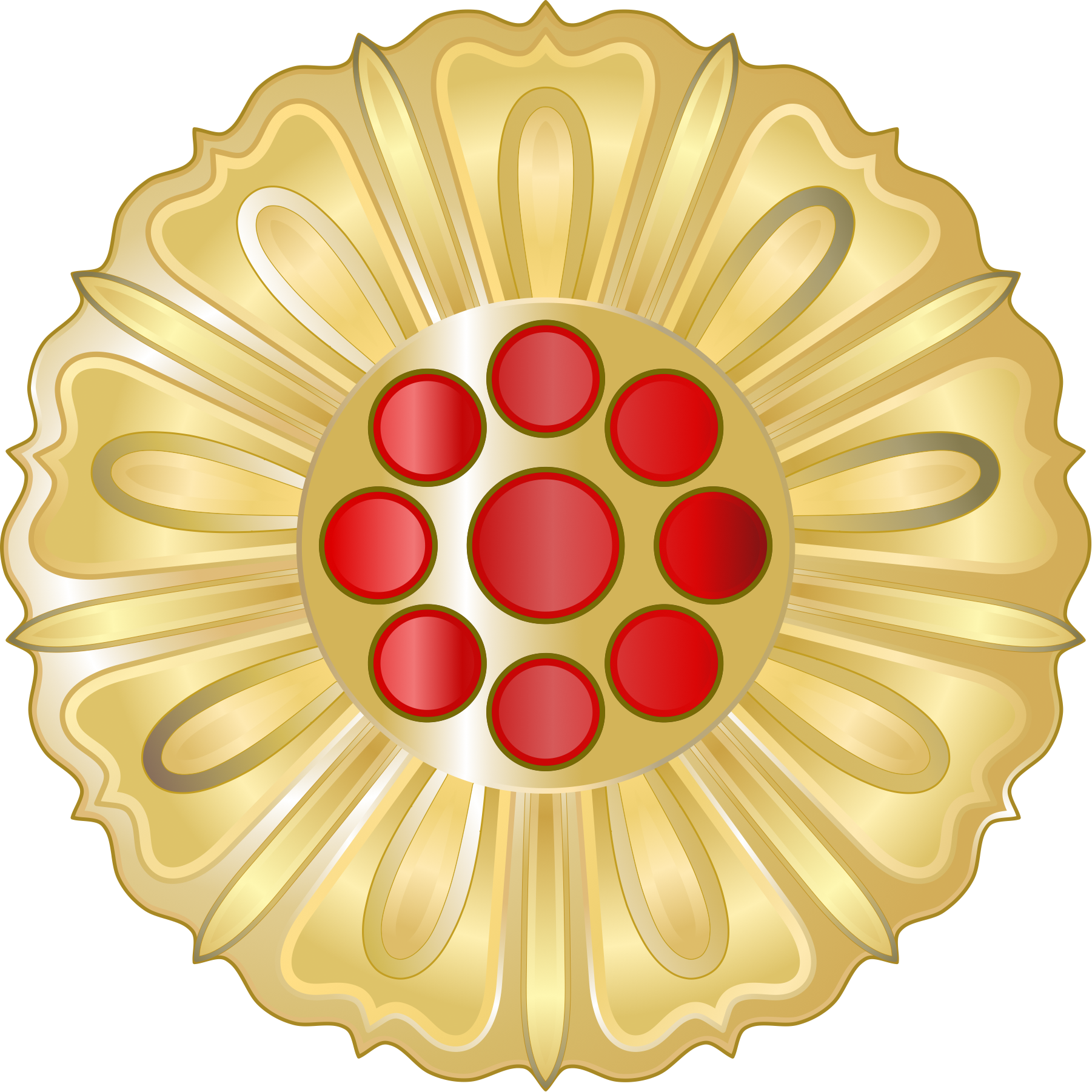
- Insignia of the Order of Thudhamma Thingaha

The Thiri Thudhamma Thingaha or the Order of Thiri Thudhamma (Burmese: သီရိသုဓမ္မသင်္ဂဟ, Thirí Thúdanma Thingăhá; lit. 'the Most Glorious Order of Truth', from Pali: sudhamma saṅgaha) was the highest Burmese commendation during the AFPFL era. In that day, Burmese orders could be also used as titles. Thiri Thudhamma Thingaha was founded on 2 September 1948. It is awarded in three classes:

1. Agga Maha Thiri Thudhamma – Grand Commander
2. Sado Thiri Thudhamma – Grand Officer
3. Maha Thiri Thudhamma – Companion

The first class consisted of a gold braided salwe worn over the right shoulder and across the breast with two badges of the order appended in the front, and also a large gold enamelled breast star. The second class consisted a single, breast star similar to the first class but smaller. Third class was a badge, worn from a ribbon around the neck. Generally speaking, the first class was conferred to the Head of State of the Union of Burma (1948–1962) and the Heads of State and Heads of Governments from other countries.

== Recipients ==
- U Ba U, Second President of Burma – Grand Commander
- Thein Sein, Eighth President of Burma – Grand Commander
- U Win Maung, Third President of Burma – Grand Commander
- Josip Broz Tito, President of Yugoslavia – Grand Commander, 1955

== See also ==
- Order of Burma
- Maha Thiri Thudhamma
- Pyidaungsu Sithu Thingaha
- Salwe
