= Win Maung =

3rd president of Myanmar

His Excellency Agga Maha Thray Sithu Agga Maha Thiri Thudhamma Mahn Win Maung
- မန်းဝင်းမောင်
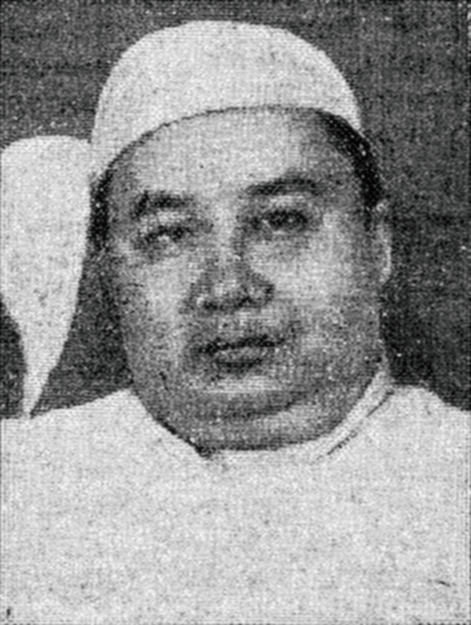
- Win Maung in 1958

3rd President of Burma
- In office 13 March 1957 – 2 March 1962
- Prime Minister: U Nu; Ne Win; U Nu
- Preceded by: Ba U
- Succeeded by: Ne Win as Chairman of the Union Revolutionary Council

Personal details
- Born: 17 April 1916 Hlezeit village, Kyonpyaw Township, Bassein District, Lower Burma, British India
- Died: 4 July 1989 (aged 73) Yangon, Myanmar
- Party: AFPFL
- Other political affiliations: KYO
- Spouse: Mya May
- Education: University of Rangoon (BA)
- Awards: Independence Mawgunwin (Second Class)

Mahn Win Maung (Burmese: မန်းဝင်းမောင် [máɰ̃ wɪ́ɰ̃ màʊɰ̃]; 17 April 1916 – 4 July 1989) was an Anglo-Burmese politician who served as the third president of Burma.

== Early life ==
Win Maung was an ethnic Karen and born on 17 April 1916 in the Irrawaddy delta, son of Daw Tharya and U Shwe Yin. He graduated with a B.A. from Rangoon University's Judson College in 1937.

== Career ==
Between 1947 and 1956, he was variously Minister of Ministry of Mining and Labour, Minister of the Ministry of Transport and Telecommunication and Minister of the Ministry of Water, Air and Coastal Ship.

He was selected by Prime Minister U Nu for the presidency in March 1957. He served for five years until 2 March 1962, when General Ne Win's military coup d'état ousted Nu's government. He was imprisoned between 1962 and 1967.

== Personal life ==
He privately visited the United States to receive medical treatment from 16 to 28 December 1957. During his visit to the U.S., he met with President Dwight D. Eisenhower, 34th President of the United States.

Political offices
Preceded by Ba U	President of Burma; 1957–1962	Succeeded by Ne Win; Chairman of the Union Revolutionary Council
