= List of villages in Kyonpyaw Township =

This is a list of villages in Kyonpyaw Township, Pathein District, Ayeyarwady Region, Myanmar.

Village	Village code	Village tract	Coordinates (links to map & photo sources)	Notes
Gyo Kone	162202	Thaung	17.3667°N 95.1°E	
Kyaung Su	162205	Thaung	17.3492°N 95.1665°E	
Thaung Ywar Ywar Ma	162201	Thaung	17.347°N 95.1766°E	
Boe Htaunt	162204	Thaung	17.3418°N 95.1877°E	
Hman Kone	162206	Thaung	17.3595°N 95.1794°E	
Kone Su	162207	Thaung	17.3583°N 95.175°E	
Daunt Gyi	162208	Thaung	17.3627°N 95.1652°E	
Kyo Thit Kone	162203	Thaung	17.3377°N 95.1878°E	
Kyon Pat Auk Su	159560	Pyin Cha Seik		
Kone Pat Ah Htet Su	159559	Pyin Cha Seik		
YwarThit	159558	Pyin Cha Seik		
Pyin Cha Seik Paing	159557	Pyin Cha Seik	17.3265°N 95.1872°E	
Nga Pyay Ma Yoe	162054	Than Hlyet Sun		
Ba Lan Gyi	162053	Than Hlyet Sun		
Than Hlyet Sun Ywar Ma	162052	Than Hlyet Sun		
La Har Paing	156511	La Har Paing	17.2883°N 95.1771°E	
Htein Ngu Gyi Ywar Ma	152780	Htein Ngu Gyi	17.2787°N 95.1509°E	
Kwin Thar Ywar Ma	154958	Kwin Thar	17.286°N 95.1458°E	
Kwin Thar Ah Nauk Su	154960	Kwin Thar	17.2873°N 95.1395°E	
Hmaw Thay Ah Shey Su	154966	Kwin Thar	17.2998°N 95.1594°E	
Yone Tone	154961	Kwin Thar	17.3°N 95.1333°E	
Lel Di	154962	Kwin Thar		
Hpan Khar Chaung	154963	Kwin Thar		
Ah Nyar Tan	154964	Kwin Thar		
Hmaw Thay Aing Ma	154965	Kwin Thar		
Kone Su	154969	Kwin Thar		
Dwar Ya Su	154968	Kwin Thar		
Da None Kwin Lay	154967	Kwin Thar		
Kwin Thar Taung Su	154959	Kwin Thar	17.2856°N 95.1537°E	
Let Pan Ngu	158567	Nyaung Pin Seik	17.3599°N 95.1814°E	
Kyan La Har	158566	Nyaung Pin Seik	17.3681°N 95.1969°E	
Nyaung Pin Seik Ywar Ma	158560	Nyaung Pin Seik	17.3486°N 95.1875°E	
Nat Kan	158561	Nyaung Pin Seik	17.3387°N 95.1943°E	
Nyaung Lan	158562	Nyaung Pin Seik	17.3321°N 95.209°E	
Pein Inn	158564	Nyaung Pin Seik	17.3474°N 95.2111°E	
Tha Pyay Hla	158568	Nyaung Pin Seik	17.3489°N 95.1816°E	
War Taw Su	158565	Nyaung Pin Seik		
Bi Sa Laung	158563	Nyaung Pin Seik	17.34°N 95.2143°E	
Kyat Kone	163969	Za Yit Yoe		
Za Yit Yoe Lay	163967	Za Yit Yoe	17.3423°N 95.2238°E	
Za Yit Yoe Gyi	163968	Za Yit Yoe	17.3387°N 95.2284°E	
Daung Aing	163971	Za Yit Yoe		
Hlay Swea	163972	Za Yit Yoe		
Za Yit Yoe Kan Nar	163970	Za Yit Yoe	17.3438°N 95.2341°E	
Ma Yan Yo	161286	Taw Chaung	17.303°N 95.241°E	
In Ga Lar	161288	Taw Chaung		
Shan Su	161290	Taw Chaung	17.2943°N 95.2124°E	
Sin Chaung	161289	Taw Chaung	17.3186°N 95.2371°E	
Taw Chaung	161285	Taw Chaung	17.3044°N 95.2229°E	
Ka Nyin Kaing	161287	Taw Chaung		
Kone Nyaung Saing	155436	Kyee Aing	17.3457°N 95.2413°E	
Hpa Yar Lay Seik	155445	Kyee Aing	17.3101°N 95.265°E	
Koke Ko Taw	155444	Kyee Aing	17.3199°N 95.2484°E	
Kan Nar Nyaung Saing	155443	Kyee Aing		
Tauk Teit Yoe	155442	Kyee Aing	17.3339°N 95.2451°E	
Kyar Pyit Kwin	155441	Kyee Aing	17.3193°N 95.2667°E	
Sin Aing	155440	Kyee Aing		
Kwin Baw Lay	155439	Kyee Aing	17.3439°N 95.2516°E	
Ywar Thit	155435	Kyee Aing	17.3289°N 95.237°E	
Hlay Lon Yoe	155434	Kyee Aing	17.3226°N 95.2662°E	
Kyee Aing Lay	155433	Kyee Aing	17.3334°N 95.2606°E	
Pyin Ka Doe Kone	155438	Kyee Aing		
Thea Kone	155437	Kyee Aing	17.3191°N 95.2626°E	
Kyan La Har (North)	154561	Kone Thar Gyi	17.3943°N 95.1992°E	
Kyan La Har (Middle)	154567	Kone Thar Gyi	17.3873°N 95.1981°E	
Zee Kone	154566	Kone Thar Gyi		
Kyan La Har (South)	154565	Kone Thar Gyi	17.3736°N 95.1966°E	
Kone Thar Ywar Ma	154560	Kone Thar Gyi	17.3907°N 95.2186°E	
Hpa Yar Seik	154562	Kone Thar Gyi	17.3838°N 95.1873°E	
Ah Twin Inn	154563	Kone Thar Gyi	17.4091°N 95.1957°E	
Tha Yet Thone Pin	154564	Kone Thar Gyi		
Inn Hpyar Ywar Ma	153042	Inn Hpyar	17.3704°N 95.2369°E	
Sar Hpyu Su	153046	Inn Hpyar	17.3796°N 95.2535°E	
Lein Kone	153045	Inn Hpyar	17.3734°N 95.2496°E	
Shan Su	153043	Inn Hpyar		
Gyone Gyone Kya	153047	Inn Hpyar	17.394°N 95.2523°E	
Pi Tauk Kone	153044	Inn Hpyar		
Ohn Taw Su	153999	Kan Thone Sint		
Daw Ma Lay Ah Su	154003	Kan Thone Sint		
Kan Nar Su	154000	Kan Thone Sint		
Lein Kone	154001	Kan Thone Sint		
Ywar Thit	154002	Kan Thone Sint		
Kan Thone Sint Ywar Ma	153998	Kan Thone Sint	17.3804°N 95.2611°E	
Ah Ku Chaung	159022	Paik Taw	17.4625°N 95.2744°E	
Paik Taw Kan Nar Su	159026	Paik Taw	17.4672°N 95.2835°E	
Moe Kwei	159023	Paik Taw	17.4585°N 95.2855°E	
Kyun Paw	159025	Paik Taw	17.4629°N 95.2616°E	
Zay Cho Seik	159024	Paik Taw	17.4619°N 95.2565°E	
Paik Taw Gyi	159021	Paik Taw	17.4489°N 95.2739°E	
Kyar Chaung	159027	Paik Taw	17.4746°N 95.2769°E	
War Taw Su	161855	Tha Yet Chaung		
Tha Yet Chaung Ywar Ma	161853	Tha Yet Chaung	17.4654°N 95.2418°E	
Oke Taik	161854	Tha Yet Chaung		
Ta Loke Kone	151329	Daik Pyet	17.4688°N 95.1845°E	
Kwin Pyar	151330	Daik Pyet	17.4715°N 95.1966°E	
Kyi Kone	151331	Daik Pyet	17.477°N 95.1832°E	
Daik Pyet Ywar Ma	151328	Daik Pyet	17.4705°N 95.2164°E	
Doke Yaik	151333	Daik Pyet	17.4591°N 95.1837°E	
Kayin Taw	151332	Daik Pyet	17.4728°N 95.2083°E	
Tha Khut Kone	160008	Sauk Waing	17.4523°N 95.2147°E	
Kyar Inn	160003	Sauk Waing	17.4317°N 95.2109°E	
Oke Ta Man	160004	Sauk Waing	17.4486°N 95.2376°E	
Kyan Taw Su	160005	Sauk Waing	17.4491°N 95.2291°E	
Pyay Taw Thar	160007	Sauk Waing		
Hman Taw Chaung	160009	Sauk Waing	17.4519°N 95.2307°E	
Hpa Lan Kone	160010	Sauk Waing		
Baw Kone	160006	Sauk Waing		
Ka Nyin Chaung	155853	Kyon Ma Yan	17.4144°N 95.1832°E	
Ma Gyi La Har	155852	Kyon Ma Yan	17.4161°N 95.1874°E	
Kyon Ma Yan Ywar Ma	155850	Kyon Ma Yan	17.396°N 95.1747°E	
Kan Ka Lay Kone	155851	Kyon Ma Yan	17.412°N 95.1787°E	
Hpa Lan Kone Ywar Ma	152225	Hpa Lan Kone	17.4329°N 95.2361°E	
Kyat Kwin	152229	Hpa Lan Kone	17.4164°N 95.2394°E	
Saik Kwin	152228	Hpa Lan Kone	17.4369°N 95.2503°E	
Set Kwin	152230	Hpa Lan Kone	17.4231°N 95.2509°E	
Hmyaw Aing	152226	Hpa Lan Kone		
War Taw Su	152227	Hpa Lan Kone		
Kyun Waing Lay	153073	Inn Par		
Ma Tawt Kone	153072	Inn Par	17.4036°N 95.2342°E	
Inn Par Ywar Ma	153071	Inn Par		
Sauk Tan	153074	Inn Par	17.3938°N 95.2332°E	
Chin Hlyar Lay	151215	Chin Hlyar	17.3921°N 95.2637°E	
Gyone Gyone Kya	151218	Chin Hlyar	17.3942°N 95.2555°E	
Hpa Yar Au Pauk	151216	Chin Hlyar		
Kya Khat Kwin	151217	Chin Hlyar	17.4099°N 95.2536°E	
Si Tauk Yoe	163106	Wea Gyi	17.4397°N 95.2522°E	
Gway Tauk Kwin	163105	Wea Gyi	17.4319°N 95.2606°E	
Gon Nyin Tan	163104	Wea Gyi	17.4422°N 95.2719°E	
Wea Gyi Ywar Ma	163103	Wea Gyi	17.426°N 95.2844°E	
Me Za Li Kone	156153	Kyu Taw		
Kyaung Su	156147	Kyu Taw	17.4636°N 95.3078°E	
Pein Inn Kone	156156	Kyu Taw	17.4294°N 95.299°E	
Ta Loke Kone	156154	Kyu Taw		
Ta Zin Inn	156152	Kyu Taw	17.4654°N 95.2954°E	
Saing Htun Kone	156151	Kyu Taw	17.4464°N 95.2974°E	
Ka Nyin Yoe	156150	Kyu Taw	17.4601°N 95.294°E	
Hman Aing	156149	Kyu Taw	17.438°N 95.3046°E	
Hpu Lar	156148	Kyu Taw	17.4524°N 95.3072°E	
Yae Twin Yoe	156146	Kyu Taw	17.4451°N 95.2851°E	
Kone Su	156155	Kyu Taw	17.4557°N 95.3192°E	
Kyu Taw Yar Ma	156145	Kyu Taw	17.4224°N 95.3042°E	
Tha Pyu Pin Kwin	161724	Tha Pyay Hla	17.4016°N 95.2762°E	
Yoe Lay	161723	Tha Pyay Hla	17.41°N 95.2778°E	
Tha Pyay Hla Ywar Ma	161721	Tha Pyay Hla	17.4167°N 95.2833°E	
Kywe Hmaw Kwin	161722	Tha Pyay Hla	17.4079°N 95.268°E	
Hmaw Htu Kan Nar Su	161310	Taw Gyi	17.3414°N 95.3276°E	
Taw Gyi (Middle)	161295	Taw Gyi	17.3378°N 95.3017°E	
Taw Gyi Kone Su	161294	Taw Gyi	17.3408°N 95.3052°E	
Hmaw Htu Kone Su	161313	Taw Gyi	17.3481°N 95.3226°E	
Taw Gyi Kan Nar	161296	Taw Gyi	17.3338°N 95.3014°E	
Ohn Thone Pin	161311	Taw Gyi	17.3493°N 95.3054°E	
Ka Nyin Saing	161302	Taw Gyi	17.3704°N 95.3053°E	
Taw Gyi (Ah Nauk Su)	161297	Taw Gyi	17.3353°N 95.2985°E	
Kone Me Za Li	161298	Taw Gyi	17.3553°N 95.3182°E	
Boe Seik Kone	161299	Taw Gyi	17.3464°N 95.3105°E	
Kyu Taw Inn	161312	Taw Gyi		
Kan Nar Me Za Li	161301	Taw Gyi	17.3385°N 95.3143°E	
Hmaw Htu	161309	Taw Gyi	17.3386°N 95.3219°E	
Si Kone	161303	Taw Gyi	17.3609°N 95.3018°E	
San Ta Mar	161304	Taw Gyi	17.37°N 95.3027°E	
Ywar Thit	161305	Taw Gyi	17.3592°N 95.3074°E	
Sar Hpyu Su	161306	Taw Gyi	17.3621°N 95.2926°E	
Seik Gyi	161307	Taw Gyi	17.3332°N 95.2816°E	
Taw Kone	161308	Taw Gyi	17.336°N 95.2805°E	
Pan Myaing Kone	161300	Taw Gyi	17.3514°N 95.3177°E	
Ma Gu Yoe	163952	Za Yat Seik	17.3465°N 95.2768°E	
Nat Taung	163950	Za Yat Seik		
Ma Au Kone	163948	Za Yat Seik	17.3563°N 95.2654°E	
Za Yat Seik Ywar Ma	163947	Za Yat Seik	17.3516°N 95.254°E	
Pa Loet Taung	163949	Za Yat Seik	17.357°N 95.2727°E	
Ohn Pin Su	163951	Za Yat Seik	17.3343°N 95.2656°E	
Gon Min Chaung	154771	Kwin Baw	17.3899°N 95.2731°E	
Hpa Lu Taik	154780	Kwin Baw	17.3793°N 95.2979°E	
Kwin Ka Lay Hle Seik	154779	Kwin Baw	17.3801°N 95.2678°E	
Kwin Ka Lay	154778	Kwin Baw	17.3864°N 95.2675°E	
Daik Ka Lay	154777	Kwin Baw		
Mar Lar Chaung	154776	Kwin Baw	17.3762°N 95.2842°E	
Ywar Thit Kone	154775	Kwin Baw		
Nyaung Kone	154774	Kwin Baw		
Kone Su	154773	Kwin Baw	17.3703°N 95.2693°E	
Baw Kone	154772	Kwin Baw	17.3886°N 95.2772°E	
Kwin Baw	154770	Kwin Baw	17.3613°N 95.2773°E	
Ah Htaung Ywar Ma	150062	Ah Htaung	17.3471°N 95.3368°E	
Ma Au Chaung	150063	Ah Htaung		
Inn Hpyar Ywar Ma	150064	Ah Htaung		
Kan Ka Lay Kone	150065	Ah Htaung		
Kyee Aing	153504	Ka Nyin Saing		
Leik Aing	153506	Ka Nyin Saing	17.3708°N 95.322°E	
Inn Ta Man	153507	Ka Nyin Saing	17.3959°N 95.303°E	
Ywar Thit Kone	153505	Ka Nyin Saing	17.3736°N 95.3087°E	
Ohn Hne Yoe	153503	Ka Nyin Saing	17.3886°N 95.3111°E	
Ka Nyin Saing Ywar Ma	153502	Ka Nyin Saing		
Si Kone	153512	Ka Nyin Saing		
Ma Gyi Kone	153511	Ka Nyin Saing	17.3856°N 95.3066°E	
Kyar Inn	153510	Ka Nyin Saing	17.3757°N 95.3247°E	
Thea Kone	153509	Ka Nyin Saing	17.4049°N 95.3051°E	
U Me Kone	153508	Ka Nyin Saing	17.3743°N 95.315°E	
Ywar Thar Aye	153120	Inn Ta Yaw	17.3733°N 95.3351°E	
Pa Lin	153121	Inn Ta Yaw		
Kya Wa Inn	153115	Inn Ta Yaw		
Kan Nar Ba Leik	153114	Inn Ta Yaw		
Kone Ba Leik	153113	Inn Ta Yaw		
Inn Ta Yaw Nyaung Kone	153112	Inn Ta Yaw	17.396°N 95.3322°E	
Thu Htay Kone	153119	Inn Ta Yaw		
Kyee Taw Yoe	153117	Inn Ta Yaw		
Hne Bo Kyoe	153116	Inn Ta Yaw		
Inn Ta Yaw (Taung Su)	153111	Inn Ta Yaw	17.384°N 95.3224°E	
Kun Chan Kone	153118	Inn Ta Yaw		
Inn Ta Yaw Ywar Ma	153108	Inn Ta Yaw	17.3889°N 95.3223°E	
Inn Ta Yaw (Myauk Su)	153109	Inn Ta Yaw	17.4018°N 95.3221°E	
Inn Ta Yaw (Ah Shey Su)	153110	Inn Ta Yaw	17.3961°N 95.3231°E	
Pa Lin	160242	Shar Khe		
Shar Khe Ywar Ma	160239	Shar Khe	17.4039°N 95.3622°E	
Myo Kone	160240	Shar Khe		
Kone Baung Yoe	160241	Shar Khe		
Kwin Ma	161781	Tha Pyay Ngu	17.3965°N 95.3623°E	
Pyar Sat	161784	Tha Pyay Ngu		
Kwin Kauk	161782	Tha Pyay Ngu		
Kyaung Su	161783	Tha Pyay Ngu	17.3898°N 95.3591°E	
Nyaung Kone	161785	Tha Pyay Ngu		
Kywe Chan Daunt Lay	156342	Kywe Chan Daunt		
Thet Kei Kone	156344	Kywe Chan Daunt		
Zee Hpyauk	156345	Kywe Chan Daunt		
Kywe Chan Daunt Gyi	156340	Kywe Chan Daunt		
Ah Nyar Su	156343	Kywe Chan Daunt		
Tha Pyay Ngu	156341	Kywe Chan Daunt	17.3721°N 95.3456°E	
Thein Kone	162403	Thein Kone	17.3411°N 95.3672°E	
Ohn Kone	162404	Thein Kone	17.35°N 95.3667°E	
Pauk Kone	162405	Thein Kone		
Kyet Ta Nyin Ywar Ma	155567	Kyet Ta Nyin	17.3278°N 95.3827°E	
Bant Bway Kone	155568	Kyet Ta Nyin	17.3188°N 95.3933°E	
Myauk Paing Ywar Thit Kone	155570	Kyet Ta Nyin		
Taung Paing Ywar Thit	155569	Kyet Ta Nyin		
Pauk Kone	155571	Kyet Ta Nyin		
Gon Min Chaung	157384	Man Kyar		
Htan Pin Kan	157385	Man Kyar		
Man Kyar (South)	157382	Man Kyar	17.3333°N 95.35°E	
Man Kyar (North)	157381	Man Kyar	17.3333°N 95.35°E	
Tu Myaung	157383	Man Kyar		
Kyan Taw	162648	Thit Ma Thi		
Sauk Tan	162649	Thit Ma Thi	17.3082°N 95.3507°E	
Mi Chaung Aing	162647	Thit Ma Thi	17.3031°N 95.3738°E	
Pyar Ma Lawt	162646	Thit Ma Thi		
Thit Ma Thi Ywar Ma	162645	Thit Ma Thi	17.3271°N 95.3799°E	
Aung Pan Kwin	162651	Thit Ma Thi		
Tu Myaung	162650	Thit Ma Thi	17.3176°N 95.3623°E	
Thar Yar Kone Ywar Ma	162151	Thar Yar Kone	17.3101°N 95.3904°E	
Taung Thar Gyi	162154	Thar Yar Kone		
Ywar Tan Shey	162153	Thar Yar Kone		
Yaung Yin Kone	162152	Thar Yar Kone		
Byant Gyi	154881	Kwin Hlyar		
Hpone Gyi Lu Su	154882	Kwin Hlyar		
Ta Man U	154883	Kwin Hlyar	17.2971°N 95.3859°E	
Daik Hlyar	154880	Kwin Hlyar	17.2881°N 95.4002°E	
Kyar Inn	150414	Aing Gyi		
Pauk Kone	150418	Aing Gyi		
Ma Gyi Kone	150415	Aing Gyi		
Ywar Thit	150417	Aing Gyi		
Baw Di Kone	150413	Aing Gyi	17.2758°N 95.3482°E	
Aing Gyi Ywar Ma	150412	Aing Gyi	17.2778°N 95.3545°E	
Ah Kei Gyi	150416	Aing Gyi	17.2833°N 95.3333°E	
Kyar Kwin Gyi	150419	Aing Gyi		
Ywar Thit	154796	Kwin Chauk		
Kwin Chauk	154790	Kwin Chauk	17.2878°N 95.3901°E	
Kwin (Lel Su)	154791	Kwin Chauk		
Kyon Ka Thaung	154792	Kwin Chauk		
Ta Man U	154794	Kwin Chauk		
Ka Tet Ngu	154793	Kwin Chauk		
Kyon Su	154795	Kwin Chauk		
Hlyaw Tan	154797	Kwin Chauk		
Shar Hpyu Yoe	162628	Thit Hpyu Kwin		
Yae Sa Khan	162627	Thit Hpyu Kwin		
Kyaung Ah Ma Su	162629	Thit Hpyu Kwin		
Yin Daik Kone	162630	Thit Hpyu Kwin	17.25°N 95.3167°E	
Hpu Mar Lar	162633	Thit Hpyu Kwin		
Tha Yet Taw	162632	Thit Hpyu Kwin		
Ah Ngu	162631	Thit Hpyu Kwin		
Kyon Taing	157388	Man Set Ku	17.2664°N 95.3805°E	
Man Set Ku Ywar Ma	157386	Man Set Ku	17.2593°N 95.3778°E	
Yae Nauk	157387	Man Set Ku	17.2446°N 95.3923°E	
Kyon Ka Thaung	157389	Man Set Ku	17.2667°N 95.3915°E	
Nat Chaung	157390	Man Set Ku		
Ah Nyar Su	155966	Kyon Ta Nee		
Inn Ma Kone	155965	Kyon Ta Nee		
Taing Tan Kone	155964	Kyon Ta Nee		
Kyon Ta Nee	155963	Kyon Ta Nee	17.2353°N 95.4024°E	
Pauk Pa Dan	155967	Kyon Ta Nee	17.2223°N 95.4008°E	
Leik Chaung	151562	Eik Ka Duk		
Ein Yar Gyi	151563	Eik Ka Duk		
Taung Tha Le Kone	151565	Eik Ka Duk		
Gway Dauk Kone	151564	Eik Ka Duk		
Kywe Ta Lin	156422	Kywe Ta Lin	17.207°N 95.3016°E	
Yone Chaung	162218	Thaung Gyi	17.3063°N 95.2731°E	
Ka Nyut Kwin	162219	Thaung Gyi	17.3191°N 95.2803°E	
Thaung Gyi Ywar Ma	162216	Thaung Gyi	17.3026°N 95.2819°E	
Lel Di Chaung	162217	Thaung Gyi	17.3113°N 95.2915°E	
Kan Ka Lay	154822	Kwin Gyi		
Yae Thoe Kan Nar	154823	Kwin Gyi		
Ka Nyin Pin Su	154821	Kwin Gyi		
Yae Thoe Kone Su	154824	Kwin Gyi		
Kwin Gyi Ywar Ma	154820	Kwin Gyi	17.322°N 95.3041°E	
Sa Par Htar Yoe	162595	Thin Taw Gyi		
Ka Nyin Pin Su	162596	Thin Taw Gyi		
Kya Khat Taw	162597	Thin Taw Gyi	17.3167°N 95.3333°E	
Kyaung Su	162594	Thin Taw Gyi	17.3088°N 95.3199°E	
Ywar Thit Kone	161968	Tha Yet Thone Pin		
Ah Nyar Tan	161969	Tha Yet Thone Pin		
San Tan	161967	Tha Yet Thone Pin		
Kyar Kwin	161970	Tha Yet Thone Pin		
Dei Kwin	161966	Tha Yet Thone Pin	17.2844°N 95.3177°E	
Tha Yet Thone Pin Ywar Ma	161965	Tha Yet Thone Pin	17.296°N 95.3234°E	
Ah Nyar Tan	163911	Za Yat Kwin		
Hmyawt Htu	163912	Za Yat Kwin	17.2937°N 95.3043°E	
Lel Di Su	155052	Kyaik Par		
Tha Yet Yoe	155051	Kyaik Par	17.2767°N 95.2945°E	
Ah Nauk Paing	155053	Kyaik Par		
Kyaik Par Ywar Ma	155050	Kyaik Par	17.2667°N 95.3°E	
Sin Hnit Kaung	158211	Nga Gyi Htu	17.2853°N 95.2617°E	
Ngar Ein Tan	158209	Nga Gyi Htu		
Inn Waing	158207	Nga Gyi Htu	17.2767°N 95.2893°E	
Oke Shit Gyi	158204	Nga Gyi Htu	17.2837°N 95.2832°E	
Tha Yet Kone	158206	Nga Gyi Htu	17.2738°N 95.2626°E	
Aung Lan Su	158205	Nga Gyi Htu	17.2947°N 95.2756°E	
Kwin Thar	158212	Nga Gyi Htu		
Nga Gyi Htu Ywar Ma	158202	Nga Gyi Htu	17.2887°N 95.2586°E	
Daik Hlyar	158213	Nga Gyi Htu	17.2951°N 95.2678°E	
Ywar Thit	158208	Nga Gyi Htu		
Nga Poke Shwe	158210	Nga Gyi Htu	17.2819°N 95.253°E	
Tha Yet Kwe	158203	Nga Gyi Htu	17.2722°N 95.2571°E	
In Ga Lar	158201	Nga Gyi Htu	17.2939°N 95.2471°E	
Chaung Sauk	150309	Ah Su Gyi	17.2722°N 95.2395°E	
Pyaw Kone	150311	Ah Su Gyi		
Nyaung Pin Kwin	150310	Ah Su Gyi	17.2934°N 95.2241°E	
Tha Yet Yoe	150312	Ah Su Gyi	17.2808°N 95.2254°E	
Hle Seik Ywar Ma	152035	Hle Seik	17.2563°N 95.2508°E	
Nyaung Pin Thar	152038	Hle Seik	17.2643°N 95.2597°E	
Hpa Yar Gyi	152036	Hle Seik	17.256°N 95.265°E	
Kyon Ka Dun	152037	Hle Seik		
Nga Aik Kwin Ywar Ma	158174	Ngar Aik Kwin	17.2514°N 95.2899°E	
Htein Taw	158319	Ngar Aik Kwin		
Ah Nyar Tan	158320	Ngar Aik Kwin		
Myo Twin	157985	Myo Chaung		
Ywar Thit	157984	Myo Chaung	17.2393°N 95.2895°E	
Myo Chaung Ywar Ma	157983	Myo Chaung	17.25°N 95.3°E	
Zin Pyun Kone	164057	Zin Pyun	17.2331°N 95.305°E	
Htein Ta Pin Ywar Ma	152781	Htein Ta Pin	17.2667°N 95.1667°E	
Kyaung Su	154296	Kha Yu Yoe		
Taung Su	154295	Kha Yu Yoe		
Yoe Lel	162361	Thea Kone		
Oke Shit Chaung	162362	Thea Kone		
Myet Nyo Chaung	162358	Thea Kone		
Taik Kone	162360	Thea Kone		
Htaw U	162359	Thea Kone		
Thea Kone Ywar Ma	162357	Thea Kone	17.2341°N 95.1719°E	
Kywe Gaung	156389	Kywe Gaung		
Thea Chaung	156393	Kywe Gaung		
Kyon Hpar Yoe (East)	156392	Kywe Gaung		
Kyon Hpar Yoe (West)	156391	Kywe Gaung		
Nei Kyet Ma Aing	156390	Kywe Gaung		
Pyin Ka Doe Kone	159566	Pyin Ka Doe Kone		
Tha Pyay Kwin	159567	Pyin Ka Doe Kone		
Kayin Taw Gyi	159568	Pyin Ka Doe Kone		
Yae Ma Nin	159570	Pyin Ka Doe Kone		
Kaing Taw Kwin	159569	Pyin Ka Doe Kone		
Yae Tein	153963	Kan Su	17.2493°N 95.2483°E	
Kan Su	153962	Kan Su	17.2642°N 95.2336°E	
Tha Bawt Yoe	153964	Kan Su	17.2751°N 95.225°E	
Taw Ei	153175	Inn Ye	17.2538°N 95.2339°E	
Shwe Kyo Kone	153177	Inn Ye	17.2267°N 95.2382°E	
Thone Pin Saing	153171	Inn Ye		
Ma Gyi Kone	153173	Inn Ye		
Nyaung Kone	153178	Inn Ye		
Inn Ye Ywar Ma	153170	Inn Ye	17.224°N 95.2269°E	
Kun Chan Kone	153172	Inn Ye		
Inn Ye Gyi	153176	Inn Ye	17.2403°N 95.2284°E	
Yae Tein Kan Nar	153174	Inn Ye	17.2313°N 95.245°E	
Inn Ma	153048	Inn Ma	17.2317°N 95.221°E	
Zee Pin Chaung	153049	Inn Ma	17.2421°N 95.216°E	
Mi Chaung Aing	157098	Ma Gyi Kone	17.2044°N 95.1904°E	
Ywar Thit Kone	157100	Ma Gyi Kone	17.2354°N 95.1828°E	
Kin Mun Chon	157097	Ma Gyi Kone	17.2049°N 95.2034°E	
Ma Gyi Kone	157096	Ma Gyi Kone	17.2177°N 95.2112°E	
Sun Par	157099	Ma Gyi Kone	17.2204°N 95.1767°E	
Lel Di Kwin	157101	Ma Gyi Kone		
Htan Pin Kan	157102	Ma Gyi Kone	17.2322°N 95.1974°E	
Mi Chaung Aing (East)	157592	Mi Chaung Aing		
Leik U Kone	157591	Mi Chaung Aing		
Mi Chaung Aing (West)	157590	Mi Chaung Aing		
Inn Ye (South)	161880	Tha Yet Cho	17.2095°N 95.232°E	
Ywar Thit Kone	161878	Tha Yet Cho		
Sit Taw	161882	Tha Yet Cho	17.1939°N 95.2179°E	
Tha Yet Cho	161877	Tha Yet Cho	17.1982°N 95.2313°E	
Set Kone	161879	Tha Yet Cho	17.2023°N 95.2376°E	
Naung Bo	161881	Tha Yet Cho	17.1875°N 95.2187°E	
Kyun U	156242	Kyun Inn		
Thin Gan Chaung	156240	Kyun Inn		
Kyun Inn	156237	Kyun Inn		
Aing Daunt	156238	Kyun Inn		
Ohn Taw Su	156239	Kyun Inn		
Sar Hpyu Su	156241	Kyun Inn		
Koke Ko Su	161550	Tha Hpan Chaung	17.1806°N 95.2594°E	
Ka Nyut Kwin	161541	Tha Hpan Chaung	17.1855°N 95.2495°E	
Thone Ein Tan	161531	Tha Hpan Chaung	17.1949°N 95.2654°E	
Sin Ku	161532	Tha Hpan Chaung	17.1651°N 95.2486°E	
Ma Au Chaung	161533	Tha Hpan Chaung	17.1543°N 95.2364°E	
Yone Chaung	161534	Tha Hpan Chaung	17.1535°N 95.2225°E	
Yoe Gyi	161535	Tha Hpan Chaung	17.1626°N 95.2306°E	
Thea Hpyu Lay	161536	Tha Hpan Chaung	17.176°N 95.2416°E	
Thea Hpyu (West)	161537	Tha Hpan Chaung	17.1735°N 95.2187°E	
Thea Hpyu (East)	161538	Tha Hpan Chaung	17.1818°N 95.2292°E	
Tha Hpan Chaung	161530	Tha Hpan Chaung	17.1715°N 95.2625°E	
Tha Yet Chaung	161540	Tha Hpan Chaung		
Sar Kyet Kone	161549	Tha Hpan Chaung	17.1764°N 95.25°E	
Pet Pet Gyi	161542	Tha Hpan Chaung	17.2006°N 95.2552°E	
Shwe Ka Nyin Pin	161543	Tha Hpan Chaung		
Dei Kwin	161544	Tha Hpan Chaung	17.1917°N 95.2471°E	
Kyu Taw Yoe	161545	Tha Hpan Chaung		
Kywe Gaung	161546	Tha Hpan Chaung	17.1584°N 95.2145°E	
Thea Hpyu Ah Lel Kone	161547	Tha Hpan Chaung	17.1675°N 95.2125°E	
Thea Hpyu (Middle)	161551	Tha Hpan Chaung	17.1774°N 95.2231°E	
Hpa Yar Gyi Kone	161548	Tha Hpan Chaung		
Ta Dar Yoe	161539	Tha Hpan Chaung	17.1867°N 95.2354°E	
Tha Yet Taw	161552	Tha Hpan Chaung	17.1675°N 95.2125°E	
Ma Hla Pan	157158	Ma Hla Pan		
Moe Kyoe Pyit	157159	Ma Hla Pan	17.2167°N 95.3°E	
Lel Di Su	157161	Ma Hla Pan		
Ah Nyar Su	157160	Ma Hla Pan		
Kywe Gaung Ga Yet	161083	Taik	17.2194°N 95.2528°E	
Ywar Thar Yar	161082	Taik		
Kyee Kan Hla	161086	Taik		
Nyaung Chaung	161084	Taik	17.2207°N 95.2601°E	
Hpet Gyi Kone	161085	Taik	17.2317°N 95.2707°E	
Khe Paung	160352	Shwe Ka Nyin Pin	17.298°N 95.2029°E	
Shwe Ka Nyin Pin Ywar Ma	160348	Shwe Ka Nyin Pin	17.2116°N 95.264°E	
Ga Yet Shey	160349	Shwe Ka Nyin Pin	17.213°N 95.2842°E	
Thea Chaung	160351	Shwe Ka Nyin Pin		
Ywar Thar Gyi	160350	Shwe Ka Nyin Pin		
Kyar Yoe	163149	Wet Chaung	17.185°N 95.2733°E	
Kat Hpo	163154	Wet Chaung	17.1931°N 95.2831°E	
Inn Meik	163153	Wet Chaung	17.1991°N 95.2882°E	
Ta Loke Kone	163148	Wet Chaung	17.1734°N 95.2752°E	
Wet Chaung Ywar Ma	163147	Wet Chaung	17.1603°N 95.2574°E	
Ywar Thit Kone	163152	Wet Chaung	17.18°N 95.277°E	
Kyun Taw Su	163150	Wet Chaung	17.2974°N 97.0776°E	
Kyaung Yoe	163151	Wet Chaung	17.1744°N 95.2835°E	
Boe Lein Kwin (East)	150425	Aing Ma	17.187°N 95.3191°E	
Za Yat Su	150426	Aing Ma		
Boe Lein Kwin (West)	150424	Aing Ma	17.1847°N 95.315°E	
Aing Ma	150423	Aing Ma	17.2°N 95.3°E	
Ah Lel Su	160507	Sin Gaung		
Ah Nauk Su	160506	Sin Gaung		
Kyaung Su	160508	Sin Gaung		
Kyar Man	160509	Sin Gaung		
Aung Pan Chaung	151600	Ga Nein		
Ga Nein Ywar Ma	151599	Ga Nein	17.1626°N 95.3076°E	
Kyoet Pin Seik	151607	Ga Nein		
Sin Maung Kwin Lay	151606	Ga Nein		
Sin Maung Kwin Gyi	151605	Ga Nein		
Ywar Thit	151604	Ga Nein		
Nga Nei	151601	Ga Nein	17.1545°N 95.3186°E	
Htein Taw Gyi	151603	Ga Nein		
Za Yat Su	151602	Ga Nein		
Kyauk Pone	151259	Da Naw		
Nga Nei	151256	Da Naw		
Kha Yei Kan	151255	Da Naw		
Tha Yet Kone	151257	Da Naw		
Leik Kone	151258	Da Naw		
Sin Chaung	151254	Da Naw		
Ohn Pin Su	151253	Da Naw		
Da Naw Ywar Ma	151252	Da Naw	17.1606°N 95.3702°E	
Sin Gaung	150124	Ah Kway Tan		
Shwe Kyo Kone	150122	Ah Kway Tan		
Inn Thaung Gyi	150123	Ah Kway Tan		
Ah Kway Tan Ywar Ma	150121	Ah Kway Tan		
Ah Twin Inn	163893	Za Yat Hla	17.4096°N 95.1963°E	
Ma Gyi La Har	163891	Za Yat Hla	17.4192°N 95.1871°E	
Pale Kwin	163892	Za Yat Hla	17.437°N 95.2009°E	
Doe Tan Ngu	163889	Za Yat Hla	17.441°N 95.1798°E	
Pyin Ma Chaung	163890	Za Yat Hla	17.4238°N 95.2032°E	
Za Yat Hla Ywar Ma	163888	Za Yat Hla	17.4287°N 95.1764°E	
Thet Kei Pyin Ywar Ma	162462	Thet Kei Pyin	17.4805°N 95.259°E	
Moe Ma Kha	162463	Thet Kei Pyin	17.479°N 95.2448°E	
Tha Pyay Aing Kan Nar	157859	Myet Ni Kwin	17.4833°N 95.1969°E	
Ta Loke Kone	157857	Myet Ni Kwin		
Ta Dar U	157855	Myet Ni Kwin		
Kan Nar Su	157861	Myet Ni Kwin		
Lan Khwe	157856	Myet Ni Kwin		
Kyaung Su	157858	Myet Ni Kwin	17.4925°N 95.2099°E	
Nwe Ni Yoe	157860	Myet Ni Kwin		
Taw Tan	157862	Myet Ni Kwin		
Kone Thar (West)	159663	Pyin Ma Pin Hla		
Pyin Ma Pin Hla	159658	Pyin Ma Pin Hla	17.3649°N 95.2138°E	
Kone Thar (East)	159662	Pyin Ma Pin Hla		
Kwin Lel Su	159661	Pyin Ma Pin Hla		
Za Yat Kwin	159664	Pyin Ma Pin Hla		
Myauk Kwin	159659	Pyin Ma Pin Hla		
Zee Kone	159660	Pyin Ma Pin Hla		
Mee Thee Kone	162593	Thin Taw Ga Yet		
Nyaung Waing	162592	Thin Taw Ga Yet	17.4519°N 95.1707°E	
Doe Tan Ngu	162591	Thin Taw Ga Yet	17.4423°N 95.1766°E	
Ah Waing Lay	150376	Ah Waing Nin Gyan		
Let Pan Pin Seik (North)	150383	Ah Waing Nin Gyan		
Za Yat Seik	150382	Ah Waing Nin Gyan		
Thone Gwa	150381	Ah Waing Nin Gyan		
Tu Myaung	150380	Ah Waing Nin Gyan		
Oke Shit Su	150379	Ah Waing Nin Gyan		
Let Pan Pin Seik (South)	150378	Ah Waing Nin Gyan		
Nin Gyan	150377	Ah Waing Nin Gyan		
Ah Waing Gyi	150375	Ah Waing Nin Gyan		
Lun Taing	157420	Me Ga Yet	17.4252°N 95.332°E	
Lel Pyin Su	157424	Me Ga Yet		
Nyaung Pin Su	157423	Me Ga Yet	17.4225°N 95.3205°E	
Ywar Thit Kone	157422	Me Ga Yet	17.4141°N 95.3307°E	
Me Ga Yet	157417	Me Ga Yet	17.4146°N 95.3215°E	
Paik Inn	157418	Me Ga Yet	17.4345°N 95.3371°E	
Hlay Swea	157419	Me Ga Yet		
Kyon Wun	157425	Me Ga Yet	17.4118°N 95.3416°E	
Nyaung Lay Pin	157421	Me Ga Yet	17.4338°N 95.3244°E	
Kan Kone	150771	Baw Zoke		
Taung Su Gyi	150770	Baw Zoke		
Baw Zoke	150765	Baw Zoke	17.1877°N 95.3757°E	
Chaung Zauk	150766	Baw Zoke	17.2131°N 95.3795°E	
Kyar Man	150773	Baw Zoke		
Me Za Li	150768	Baw Zoke	17.2048°N 95.3827°E	
Kyauk Pone	150769	Baw Zoke		
Nyaung Pin Su	150772	Baw Zoke	17.2019°N 95.3705°E	
Pauk Pa Dan	150767	Baw Zoke	17.2175°N 95.4007°E	
