= Kyonpyaw Township =

Kyonpyaw Township ကျုံပျော်မြို့နယ်
- Township
- Location in Kyonpyaw district

- Location within Myanmar
- Coordinates: 17°18′N 95°12′E
- Country: Myanmar
- Region: Ayeyarwady Region
- District: Kyonpyaw District
- Capital: Kyonpyaw

Area
  - Total: 319.7600 sq mi (828.1746 km^{2})
- Elevation: 18 ft (5.5 m)

Population (2023)
  - Total: 262,581
  - Density: 821.182/sq mi (317.060/km^{2})
  - Ethnicities: Bamar; Karen
- Time zone: UTC+6:30 (MMT)

Kyonpyaw Township (Burmese: ကျုံပျော်မြို့နယ်) is a township in the south of Kyonpyaw District in the Ayeyarwady Division of Myanmar. The capital is Kyonpyaw town, founded 600 years ago. The township, like others in its district, used to be part of Pathein District until 2022. The Township borders Lemyethna Township and Hinthada Township of Hinthada District to the north. To the east and southeast it borders Danubyu Township and Pantanaw Township of Maubin District respectively. To the south and west, it borders Kyaunggon Township and Yekyi Township respectively. The Township has a significant Karen population and is divided into 2 towns, 8 wards, 89 village tracts and 523 villages.

== History ==
Kyonpyaw Township's name derives from Mon Krangpi meaning three streams named in the 15th century. The Township in modern times was founded on 30 August 1972.

Tun Myint Oo, the Parliamentary Democracy Party candidate for Kyonpyaw Township for the 2015 elections was arrested in 2018 with a grenade and swords after showing nationalist sympathies working with Arakan groups and with U Wirathu.

== Geography ==
Kyonpyaw Township is a flat low-lying delta area with several streams running through it. the Daka river passes through Kyonpyaw town where it meets another major stream, Ahtaung stream, just east of the town. Besides Kyonpyaw, the town of Ahtaung is the next largest, but significantly smaller, center of population. Both the Ahtaung and the Daka meander significantly in the town and lead to elongated rice cultivation land use patterns. The township also hosts Inye Lake, an oxbow lake. Most of the waterways are freshwater with many being navigable by boat for the transportation of the township's people and goods. Prior to the construction of the Yangon-Pathein Highway, the Daka river was the main way to access the town from Yangon.

Despite the township's lack of large natural forests, it has a wide variety of classic southern Burmese trees including lebbek trees, Mango trees, Jackfruit trees, Banyan trees, Bamboo, Coconut trees, Tamarind trees, Burmese plum trees among others. The township also has a significant wildlife population- mostly waterfowl like ducks, cranes and cormorants.

Kyonpyaw Township is located in a hot tropical zone with a heavy monsoon presence. Average highs and lows range between 42°C and 19°C, respectively. Between 2016 and 2019, the average year sees 90.25 days of rain with an average rainfall of 296.71 inches (753.64 cm) per year.

== Demographics ==
Historical Population
| Year | Kyonpyaw Township | ±% |
|---|---|---|
| 2014 | 235,727 | — |
| 2018 | 245,352 | +4.1% |
| 2019 | 252,885 | +3.1% |
| 2022 | 261,629 | +3.5% |
| 2023 | 262,581 | +0.4% |
Source: Ministry of Labor, Immigration, and Population and General Administration Department data

Kyonpyaw township is very rural with 90.2% of the population in 2019 living outside of either Kyonpyaw or Ahtaung. The town has a significant Karen minority accounting for 41.5% of the population. The majority religion is Buddhism with 71.76% of the population adhering to it. The religion with the second most followers is Christianity with 27.92% of the population. The median age is 28.5 and the mean household size is 4.1 people. The township's literacy rate is 89.9% and workforce participation is 86.7% for males and 41.2% for females. Only 66.7% of the township has an official citizenship scrutiny card.

== Economy ==
The main industry in Kyonpyaw Township is agriculture with 133,874 acres of farmland. The primary crop is rice and black lentils with peanuts and green peas as the primary cool season crop. The Township also has many orchards of which its major products include bananas.

== Notable people ==
Mahn Win Maung, 3rd president of Myanmar (1957–1962) was born in Hlezeit, Kyonpyaw Township in 1916.

Kenneth Sein's book The Great Po Sein chronicling the famous Burmese dance actor Po Sein, the character of a young Po Sein lives in Kyonpyaw when a dance troupe passes through the town, prompting his interest.

== See also ==
- List of villages in Kyonpyaw Township
