= Ba U =

Former President of Burma

Agga Maha Thray Sithu Agga Maha Thiri Thudhamma Sir U Ba U
- ဘဦး
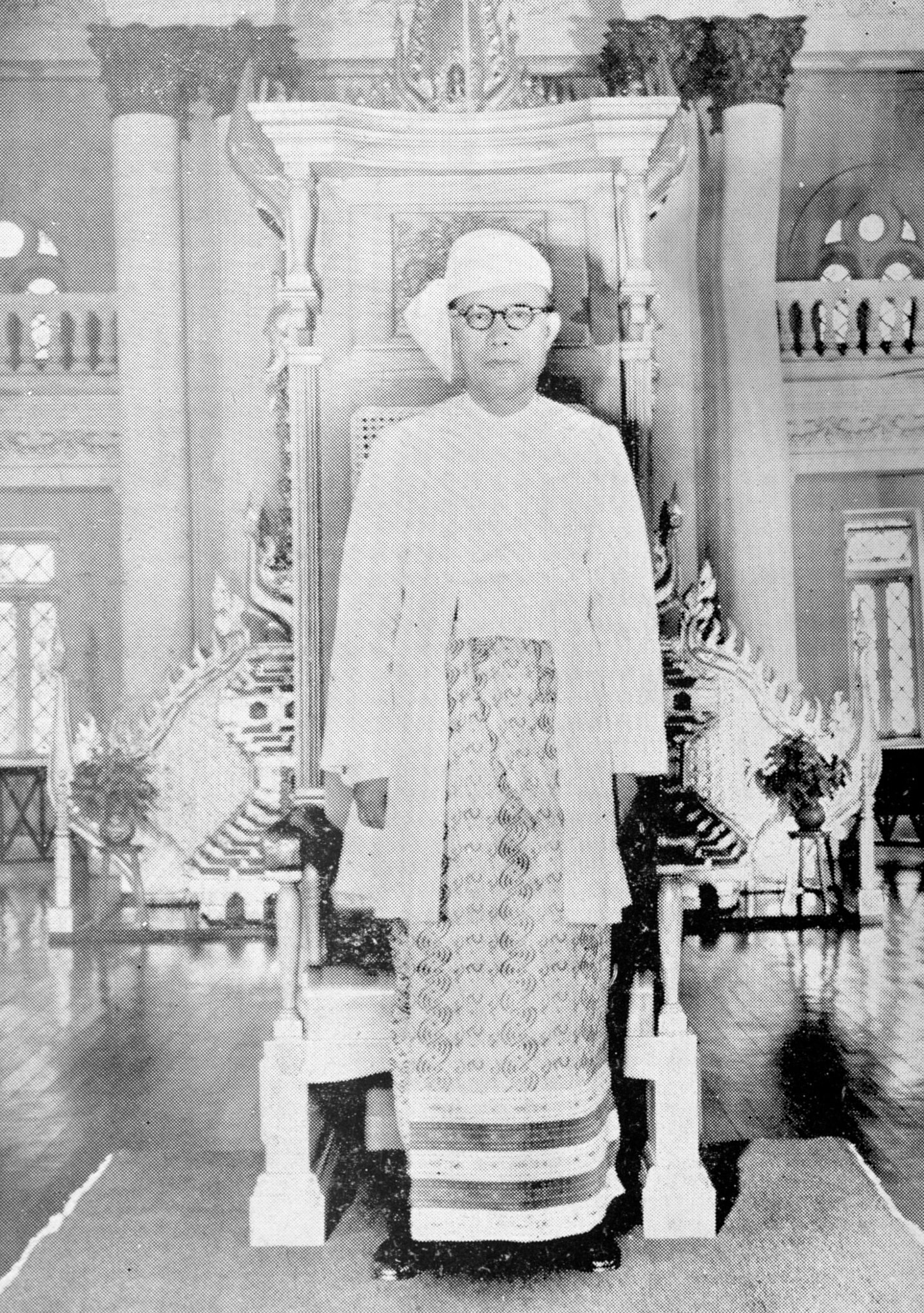
- Ba U c. 1955

2nd President of Burma
- In office 16 March 1952 – 13 March 1957
- Prime Minister: U Nu; Ba Swe
- Preceded by: Sao Shwe Thaik
- Succeeded by: Win Maung

Chief Justice of Supreme Court of Burma
- In office 1952–1948

Personal details
- Born: 26 May 1887 Pathein, Lower Burma, British India
- Died: 9 November 1963 (aged 76) Yangon, Burma (Myanmar)
- Party: AFPFL
- Spouse(s): Daw Nyein (died 1922); Daw Aye (died 1941)
- Education: MA (Cantab), LLD
- Alma mater: University of Cambridge
- Occupation: Politician; lawyer
- Awards: Thiri Thudhamma Thingaha

Sir Ba U (Burmese: ဘဦး, pronounced [ba̰ ʔú]; 26 May 1887 – 9 November 1963), was an Anglo-Burmese politician and lawyer. He served as Chief Justice of the Supreme Court of Burma from 1948 to 1952, and the second president of Burma from 16 March 1952 to 13 March 1957.

== Birth ==
He was born on 26 May 1887 at Pathein in the Irrawaddy delta, son of U Poe Hla and Daw Nyunt.

== Education ==
He passed university entry class from Rangoon Government High School. In 1907 he attended the University of Cambridge to study law and graduated in 1912. In the early 1950s, he was awarded an Honorary Doctorate of Letters at the University of Rangoon.

== Career ==
He was employed as a lawyer in Yangon between 1913 and 1921. In 1921 he became a district judge. In 1932, he was appointed to the High Court of Judicature at Rangoon as a judge. He was Chief Justice of the Supreme Court of Burma from 1948 to 1952. He was knighted in 1947. He was a member of the Anti-Fascist People's Freedom League. Ba U served as a judge under British, Japanese and Burmese rule. In 1958, he wrote an autobiography, Ba, My Burma: The Autobiography of a President. It contains little in the way of a discussion of public issues.

== Family ==
In 1913 he married Daw Nyein, daughter of retired district judge Aung Zan, and they had two sons. Daw Nyein died in 1922. In 1923 he married Daw Aye, daughter of governor Soe Pe. With her he had two sons and a daughter. Daw Aye died in 1941. He died on 9 November 1963.

Political offices
Preceded by Sao Shwe Thaik	President of Burma; 1952–1957	Succeeded by Win Maung
