= Kyonpyaw =

Kyonpyaw ကျုံပျော်မြို့
- Town
- Location in Burma
- Coordinates: 17°18′N 95°12′E
- Country: Myanmar
- Region: Ayeyarwady Region
- District: Pathein District
- Township: Kyonpyaw Township

Area
  - Total: 2.78 sq mi (7.2 km^{2})

Population (2023)
  - Total: 25,488
  - Density: 9,170/sq mi (3,540/km^{2})
  - Religions: Buddhism
- Time zone: UTC+6.30 (MST)

Kyonpyaw (Burmese: ကျုံပျော်မြို့) is a town in the Ayeyawady Division of Myanmar. It is the seat of Kyonpyaw Township. As of 2014 the population was 23,966.

== Wards ==
Kyonpyaw contains four wards:

- Taza Ward
- Myawady Ward
- Panglong Ward
- Aung San Ward

== In popular culture ==
Kenneth Sein's book The Great Po Sein chronicling the famous Burmese dance actor Po Sein, the character of a young Po Sein lives in Kyonpyaw when a dance troupe passes through the town, prompting his interest.
