= Orders, decorations, and medals of the United Kingdom =

In the United Kingdom and the British Overseas Territories, personal bravery, achievement, or service are rewarded with honours. The honours system consists of three types of award:

- Honours are used to recognise merit in terms of achievement and service;
- Decorations tend to be used to recognise specific deeds;
- Medals are used to recognise service on a particular operation or in a specific theatre, long or valuable service, and good conduct.

Awards of these and other honours are usually published in The Gazette.

== Brief history ==
Although the Anglo-Saxon monarchs are known to have rewarded their loyal subjects with rings and other symbols of favour, it was the Normans who introduced knighthoods as part of their feudal government. The first English order of chivalry, the Order of the Garter, was created in 1348 by Edward III. Since then, the system has evolved to address the changing need to recognise other forms of service to the United Kingdom.

== System ==
As the head of state, the Sovereign is the fount of honour, but the system for identifying and recognising candidates to honour has changed considerably over time. Various orders of knighthood have been created (see below) as well as awards for military service, bravery, merit, and achievement which take the form of decorations or medals. Most medals are not graded. Each one recognises specific service so there are normally set criteria which must be met. These criteria may include a period of time and will often delimit a particular geographic region. Medals are not normally presented by the Sovereign. A full list is printed in the "order of wear", published (infrequently) by The London Gazette.

=== Orders of honours ===
Honours are split into classes ("orders") and are graded to distinguish different degrees of achievement or service, according to various criteria. Nominations are reviewed by honours committees made up of government officials and private citizens from different fields, who meet twice a year to discuss the candidates and make recommendations for appropriate honours to be awarded by the Sovereign.

=== Selection and nomination ===
==== New Year and Birthday honours ====
A list of approximately 1,350 names is published twice a year, at the New Year and on the date of the Sovereign's (official) birthday. Since decisions are inevitably subjective, the twice-yearly honours lists often provoke criticism from those who feel strongly about particular cases. Candidates are identified by public or private bodies, by government departments, or are nominated by members of the public. Depending on their roles, those people selected by the honours committee are submitted either to the Prime Minister, Secretary of State for Foreign, Commonwealth and Development Affairs, or Secretary of State for Defence for their approval before being sent to the Sovereign for final approval. Certain honours are conferred solely at the Sovereign's discretion, such as appointments to the Order of the Garter, the Order of the Thistle, the Royal Victorian Order, and the Order of Merit. The honours' insignia are then presented by the Sovereign or his representative at investitures held at Buckingham Palace, Windsor Castle or the Palace of Holyroodhouse; Prince Charles, Prince William and Princess Anne deputised for Queen Elizabeth II with William and Anne continuing to do so for King Charles III since his September 2022 accession.

==== Prime Minister's Resignation Honours ====
By convention, a departing prime minister is allowed to nominate Prime Minister's Resignation Honours, to reward political and personal service. In recent history, only Tony Blair and Gordon Brown have not taken up this privilege (although Brown did issue the 2010 Dissolution Honours).

==== Special Honours ====
As part of the British honours system, Special Honours are issued at the Monarch's pleasure at any given time. The Special Honours refer to the awards made within royal prerogative, operational honours, political honours and other honours awarded outside the New Years Honours and Birthday Honours.

== Orders of chivalry ==
=== Current orders ===
The current system is made up of six orders of chivalry and four orders of merit. The statutes of each order specify matters such as the size of the order, the use of post-nominal letters and insignia design and display. These are ordered by the order of wear.

Complete name	Ranks (letters)	Ribbon	Established	Founder	Motto	Awarded to/for/by	Associated awards	Ref.
Most Noble Order of the Garter	Knight Companion (KG); Lady Companion (LG)		23 April 1348	King Edward III	Honi soit qui mal y pense ("Shame upon him who thinks evil of it")	Relating to England, Wales and Northern Ireland. Appointments are made at the Sovereign's sole discretion.		
Most Ancient and Most Noble Order of the Thistle	Knight (KT); Lady (LT)		29 May 1687	King James VII & II	Nemo me impune lacessit ("No one provokes me with impunity")	Relating to Scotland. Appointments are made at the Sovereign's sole discretion.		
Most Honourable Order of the Bath	Knight/Dame Grand Cross (GCB); Knight/Dame Commander (KCB/DCB); Companion (CB)		18 May 1725	King George I	Tria iuncta in uno ("Three joined in one")	Civil division: senior civil servants; Military division: senior military officers. The Sovereign makes all appointments to the Order on the advice of the Government.		
Order of Merit	Member (OM)		23 June 1902	King Edward VII	"For merit"	Military, science, art, literature, culture. Members are personally appointed by the Sovereign with the assistance of their private secretaries.		
Most Distinguished Order of Saint Michael and Saint George	Knight/Dame Grand Cross (GCMG); Knight/Dame Commander (KCMG/DCMG); Companion (CMG)		28 April 1818	George, Prince Regent	Auspicium melioris ævi ("Token of a better age")	Diplomats and colonial service. The Sovereign makes all appointments to the Order on the advice of the Government.		
Royal Victorian Order	Knight/Dame Grand Cross (GCVO); Knight/Dame Commander (KCVO/DCVO); Commander (CVO); Lieutenant (LVO); Member (MVO)		21 April 1896	Queen Victoria	Victoria ("Victory")	Services to the Crown. Appointments are made at the Sovereign's sole discretion.	Royal Victorian Medal, Royal Victorian Chain	
Most Excellent Order of the British Empire	Knight/Dame Grand Cross (GBE); Knight/Dame Commander (KBE/DBE); Commander (CBE); Officer (OBE); Member (MBE); Recipient [of the British Empire Medal] (BEM)		4 June 1917	King George V	"For God and the Empire"	Miscellaneous (military and civil). The Sovereign makes all appointments to the Order on the advice of the Government.	British Empire Medal (incorporated fully into the Order in 2012)	
Order of the Companions of Honour	Member (CH)		4 June 1917	King George V	"In action faithful and in honour clear"	Arts, science, politics, industry, religion. The Sovereign makes all appointments to the Order on the advice of the Government.		
Distinguished Service Order	Companion (DSO) – plus bars		6 September 1886	Queen Victoria		Military officers for leadership while on active service. The Sovereign makes all appointments to the Order on the advice of the Government.		
Imperial Service Order	Companion (ISO)		8 August 1902	King Edward VII	"For faithful service"	Civil servant for 25 years (in administrative or clerical capacity)	Imperial Service Medal	

=== Dormant orders ===
Orders were created for particular reasons at particular times. In some cases these reasons have ceased to have any validity and orders have fallen into abeyance, primarily due to the decline of the British Empire during the twentieth century. Reforms of the system have sometimes made other changes. For example, the British Empire Medal temporarily ceased to be awarded in the UK in 1993, as was the companion level award of the Imperial Service Order (although its medal is still used). The British Empire Medal was revived, however, in 2012 with 293 BEMs awarded for the 2012 Birthday Honours, and has continued to be awarded in some other Commonwealth nations.

Complete name	Ranks (letters)	Ribbon	Established	Founder	Motto	Awarded to/for	Ref.
Most Illustrious Order of Saint Patrick	Knight (KP)		17 March 1783	King George III	Quis separabit? ("Who will separate us?")	Relating to Ireland	
Most Exalted Order of the Star of India	Knight Grand Commander (GCSI); Knight Commander (KCSI); Companion (CSI)		25 June 1861	Queen Victoria	"Heaven's light our guide"	Indian, Middle Eastern and Asian rulers, Viceroys, Governors and senior administrators, Commanders-in-Chief, senior military officers and Indian civil servants	
Most Eminent Order of the Indian Empire	Knight Grand Commander (GCIE); Knight Commander (KCIE); Companion (CIE)		1 January 1878	Queen Victoria	Imperatricis auspiciis ("Under the auspices of the Empress")	Indian, Middle Eastern and Asian rulers, Viceroys, Governors and senior administrators, Commanders-in-Chief, senior military officers and Indian civil servants	
Imperial Order of the Crown of India	Companion (CI)		1 January 1878	Queen Victoria		British Princesses, wives or female relatives of Indian Princes and wives or female relatives of any person who holds or held the office of: Viceroy of India, Governor-General of India, Governor of Madras, Governor of Bombay, Governor of Bengal, Secretary of State for India, Commander-in-Chief in India.	
Order of Burma	Member (OB)		10 May 1940	King George VI		Long, faithful and honourable service of members of certain armed forces in Burma	

The Order of St Patrick was founded in 1783 by George III for the Kingdom of Ireland, and after the Acts of Union 1800 continued for Irish peers in the United Kingdom of Great Britain and Ireland. After the Irish Free State's secession in 1922, only members of the royal family were appointed to the order, the last in 1936. The last surviving knight was Prince Henry, Duke of Gloucester, who died on 10 June 1974. Although dormant, the order technically still exists, and may be used as an award at any time.

Princes or Chiefs; the Viceroy or Governor-General; the Governors of Bombay, Madras and Bengal; the Principal Secretary of State for India; and the Commander-in-Chief in India. Upon Indian independence in 1947, appointments to all these orders ceased.

HH Maharaja Tej Singh Prabhakar Bahadur of Alwar, who was a KCSI and the last surviving member of the Order of the Star of India, died in February 2009, aged 97. The last surviving member of the Order of the Indian Empire, HH Maharaja Meghrajji III of Dhrangadhra-Halvad, a KCIE, died in August 2010, aged 87. Queen Elizabeth II was appointed to the Order of the Crown of India (then as Princess Elizabeth) and was the last surviving former member of that order until her death in September 2022, aged 96.

The Order of Burma was created in May 1940 by King George VI of the United Kingdom to recognise subjects of the British colony of Burma (Myanmar) after it became a distinct colony, separate from British India. This order had one class which entitled the member to the postnominal letters OB but no title. It was originally intended to reward long and faithful service by military and police. In 1945, the Royal Warrant was altered to allow for membership for acts of gallantry as well as meritorious service. The Order was one of the rarest awarded with only 33 appointments by the time appointments were discontinued in 1948 when Burma declared independence.

=== Orders no longer associated with the British monarch ===
Complete name	Ranks (letters)	Ribbon	Established	Founder	Motto	Awarded to/for	Associated awards	Ref.
Royal Guelphic Order	Knight Grand Cross (GCH); Knight Commander (KCH); Knight (KH)		28 April 1815; Defunct 1841 (British order); Since 1841 (Hanoverian House Order)	Prince George, Prince Regent	Nec Aspera Terrent ("Not afraid of difficulties")	At the monarch's pleasure		

The Royal Guelphic Order, also known as the Hanoverian Guelphic Order, was an honour founded by George, Prince Regent in the name of his father King George III in 1815. In the United Kingdom, it was used only briefly, until the death of William IV in 1837. That is when the personal union with the Kingdom of Hanover ended due to the Hanover throne succession, which followed Salic Law, unlike the United Kingdom, where women could inherit the throne. The order continued for some time as a national order of Hanover, until the Kingdom of Hanover's defeat against Prussia and forced dissolution in 1866. Since then, it has been a house order to be awarded by the House of Hanover. The order's current head is Ernst August Prinz von Hanover, head of the House of Hanover. The Order includes two Divisions: Civil and Military. During the personal union of the United Kingdom and Hanover, it originally had three classes. Today, after several reorganizations since 1841, it is a house order with four classes and an additional Cross of Merit.

== Decorations ==
=== Current decorations ===
Current awarded decorations in order of wear:

Complete name	Post- nominal letters	Ribbon	Established	Founder	Awarded to/for	Associated awards	Ref.
Victoria Cross	VC		29 January 1856	Queen Victoria	British Empire, Commonwealth and allied military personnel for "... most conspicuous bravery, or some daring or pre-eminent act of valour or self-sacrifice, or extreme devotion to duty in the presence of the enemy."		
George Cross	GC		24 September 1940	King George VI	Commonwealth subjects for "... acts of the greatest heroism or of the most conspicuous courage in circumstances of extreme danger."	George Medal	
Conspicuous Gallantry Cross	CGC		October 1993	Queen Elizabeth II	British and allied forces for "... an act or acts of conspicuous gallantry during active operations against the enemy."	Distinguished Conduct Medal‡ Conspicuous Gallantry Medal‡	
Royal Red Cross	RRC		27 April 1883	Queen Victoria	Members of the Military Nursing Service for "... exceptional services in military nursing"		
Distinguished Service Cross	DSC		15 June 1901 as the Conspicuous Service Cross. Renamed the Distinguished Service Cross in October 1914.	King Edward VII	British, (formerly) Commonwealth and allied forces at sea for "... gallantry during active operations against the enemy."	Distinguished Service Medal‡	
Military Cross	MC		28 December 1914	King George V	British, (formerly) Commonwealth, and allied forces on land for "... gallantry during active operations against the enemy."	Military Medal‡	
Distinguished Flying Cross	DFC		3 June 1918	King George V	British, (formerly) Commonwealth, and allied forces in the air for "... gallantry during active operations against the enemy."	Distinguished Flying Medal‡	
Air Force Cross	AFC		3 June 1918	King George V	British, (formerly) Commonwealth, and allied air forces for "... gallantry while flying but not on active operations against the enemy."	Air Force Medal‡	

‡ In abeyance.

On 1 July 2009, BBC News reported that the Queen had approved a new posthumous award, the Elizabeth Cross, honouring members of the armed forces killed in action or by terrorist attack since World War II. The cross itself is given to the deceased's family.

=== Inactive decorations ===
These decorations have not been awarded since the Independence of India in 1947.

Complete name	Post- nominal letters	Ribbon	Established	Founder	Awarded to/for	Ref.
Indian Order of Merit	IOM		1 May 1837	East India Company	Indian citizens in the armed forces and civilians for gallantry.	
Order of British India	OBI	1837–1838 Original ribbon; 1838–1939 Second ribbon; 1939–1947 First Class; 1939–1947 Second Class	17 April 1837	East India Company	For "long, faithful and honourable service".	
Kaisar-i-Hind Medal			10 April 1900	Queen Victoria	Civilians of any nationality for "... distinguished service in the advancement of the interests of the British Raj".	
Indian Distinguished Service Medal	IDSM		25 June 1907	King Edward VII	Indian citizens in the armed forces and police.	

== Other honours and appointments ==
=== Hereditary peerage ===
There are five ranks of hereditary peerage: duke, marquess, earl, viscount, and baron. Until the mid-20th century, peerages were usually hereditary. Until the end of the 20th century, English, Scottish, British, and UK peerages (except, until very recent times, those for the time being held by women) carried the right to a seat in the House of Lords.

Hereditary peerages are now normally given only to Royal Family members. The most recent were the grants to: Queen Elizabeth II's youngest son, Prince Edward, Earl of Wessex, on his marriage in 1999; the Queen's grandson Prince William, made the Duke of Cambridge on the morning before his marriage to Catherine Middleton on 29 April 2011; and the Queen's grandson Prince Harry, made the Duke of Sussex on the morning before his marriage to Meghan Markle on 19 May 2018. No hereditary peerages were granted to commoners after the Labour Party came to power in 1964, until Margaret Thatcher tentatively reintroduced them by two grants to men with no sons in 1983: Speaker of the House of Commons George Thomas and former deputy prime minister William Whitelaw. Both titles died with their holders. She followed this with an earldom in 1984 for former prime minister Harold Macmillan not long before his death, reviving a traditional honour for former prime ministers. Macmillan's grandson succeeded him on his death in 1986. No hereditary peerages have been created since, and Thatcher's own title was a life peerage (see further explanation below). The concession of a baronetcy (i.e., hereditary knighthood) was granted to her husband Denis following her resignation (explained below).

Hereditary peerages are not "honours under the crown" and cannot normally be withdrawn. A peerage can be revoked only by a specific Act of Parliament, and then only for the current holder, in the case of hereditary peerages. A hereditary peer can disclaim his peerage for his own lifetime under Peerage Act 1963 within a year of inheriting the title.

=== Life peerage ===
Life peerages were introduced under the Appellate Jurisdiction Act 1876, following a test case, the Wensleydale Peerage Case (1856), which established that non-statutory life peers would not have the right to sit in the House of Lords. At that time, life peerages were intended only for law lords, who would introduce appellate legal expertise into the chamber without conferring rights on future generations, which might not have legal experts.

Subsequently, under the Life Peerages Act 1958, life peerages were more widely awarded and became the norm for all new grants outside the Royal Family. All life peers hold the rank of baron and automatically have the right to sit in the House of Lords. The title exists only for the duration of their own lifetime and is not passed to their heirs, although the children of life peers enjoy the same courtesy titles as those of hereditary peers. Some life peerages are created as an honour for achievement, others for the specific purpose of introducing legislators from the various political parties (known as working peers).

As a life peerage is not technically an "honour under the Crown", it cannot normally be withdrawn once granted. Thus, while knighthoods have been withdrawn as "honours under the Crown", convicted criminals who have served their sentences have returned to the House of Lords.

=== Baronetcy ===
A baronetcy is the lowest hereditary title in the United Kingdom. It carries the title sir. In order of precedence, a Baronetcy is below a Barony but above most knighthoods. Baronetcies are not peerages. When a baronetcy becomes vacant on the holder's death, the heir is required to register the proofs of succession if he wishes to be addressed as "Sir". The Official Roll of Baronets is kept at the Ministry of Justice, transferred from the Home Office in 2001, by the Registrar of the Baronetage. Anyone who considers that he is entitled to be entered on the roll may petition the Crown through the Lord Chancellor. Anyone succeeding to a baronetcy must exhibit proofs of succession to the Lord Chancellor. A person who is not entered on the roll will not be addressed or mentioned as a baronet or accorded precedence as a baronet, effectively declining the honour. The baronetcy can be revived at any time on provision of acceptable proofs of succession. As of 2017, 208 baronetcies are listed as presumedly not extinct but awaiting proofs of succession.

As with hereditary peerages, baronetcies generally ceased to be granted after the Labour Party came to power in 1964. The sole subsequent exception was a baronetcy created in 1990 for the husband of Margaret Thatcher, Sir Denis Thatcher, later inherited by their son Mark Thatcher.

=== Knighthood ===
Ribbon of a Knight Bachelor

Descended from medieval chivalry, knights exist both within the orders of chivalry and in a class known as Knights Bachelor. Regular recipients include High Court judges and, to a lesser extent, Chief Constables of larger police forces. Knighthood carries the title Sir; the female equivalent Dame exists only within the orders of chivalry—Dame Commander of the Order of the British Empire (DBE) is usually awarded as an equivalent of a Knight Bachelor.

=== Order of St John ===
Ribbon of the Order of St John

The Most Venerable Order of the Hospital of St John of Jerusalem established in 1888 with a royal charter, is a royal order of chivalry dedicated to charitable work, notably through St John Ambulance. Operating independently of the UK government under the patronage of the monarch as Sovereign Head, the Order's ranks include Bailiff or Dame Grand Cross (GCStJ), Knight or Dame of Justice or Grace (KStJ/DStJ), Commander (CStJ), Officer (OStJ), and Member (MStJ). Members may wear the Order's insignia, including those of Bailiff or Dame Grand Cross, as recognized in the UK order of wear. However, these ranks do not confer official rank in the order of precedence, and post-nominal initials (e.g., GCStJ, KStJ) are strictly unofficial and should never be used outside the Order's internal correspondence. Recipients of the highest grades are not addressed as "Sir" or "Dame".

=== Other orders ===
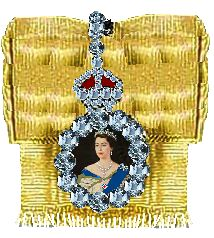
Insignia of the Royal Family Order of Elizabeth II

Other British and Commonwealth orders, decorations, and medals exist that do not carry titles but entitle the holder to place post-nominal letters after his or her name, as do a small number of Royal Family Orders.

== British honours in the Commonwealth realms ==
Until the mid-20th century, the British honours system was the primary—and generally the sole—honours system utilised across the various dominions and territories of the British Empire, which became the Commonwealth of Nations from 1949. Today, British honours and decorations continue to be awarded to citizens of Commonwealth realms and British Overseas Territories. Within the Commonwealth realms, however, the nature of the British honour or decoration awarded and the permissibility of its conferment varies from government to government. The British honours system comprises both dynastic honours, the personal gift of the Sovereign, and British state honours or decorations (known as imperial honours or decorations outside the UK), which are not. Dynastic honours continue to be conferred by the Sovereign across the Commonwealth realms, although outside the United Kingdom they are typically non-titular honours, such as the Order of Merit or the lower grades of the Royal Victorian Order.

In 1917 and 1919, the Canadian House of Commons passed the Nickle Resolutions, which although non-binding gradually ended the conferment of titular honours—peerages, baronetcies, and knighthoods—to Canadians. Occasional conferments of knighthoods (in 1934 and 1935) and imperial honours, notably after the Second World War, continued until 1955, when the Canadian government officially ended all awards of imperial honours to Canadians. In 1967, Canada established its own honours system with the Order of Canada, created its own system of bravery decorations in 1972, and its own system of military decorations for valour in 1993. Canadian service personnel remained eligible to receive the imperial Victoria Cross until 1993, when a Canadian version was instituted. Canadian citizens remain eligible for imperial honours, including peerages and knighthoods, presumably for achievements within Great Britain, however such conferment may involve individual approval by the Canadian government.

In 1975, the Australian government established its own honours system, creating the Order of Australia and its own system of bravery decorations. Indigenous police and fire service decorations followed from 1986, with a new system of military decorations created in 1991. Imperial honours continued to be conferred on Australians through 1989, when the last recommendations were made. With effect from 5 October 1992, the Australian government discontinued the awarding of imperial honours.

In 1975, New Zealand also instituted its first indigenous honour, the Queen's Service Order, followed by the Order of New Zealand in 1987. In 1996, it replaced imperial honours with the New Zealand Order of Merit, and replaced imperial gallantry and bravery decorations with New Zealand decorations in 1999.

Other Commonwealth realms have continued to apply the imperial honours system together with their own honours systems. Jamaica established its own honours system in 1969, passing the National Honours and Awards Act. Saint Lucia followed in 1980; the Solomon Islands in 1981; Belize in 1991; Antigua and Barbuda in 1998; Papua New Guinea in 2004; and Grenada in 2007. The government of the Bahamas continues to solely use imperial honours. In 2007, it passed a National Honours Act establishing a Bahamian honours system; however, it had not come into effect as of 2015.

In practice, legislation across the Commonwealth realms regulating the awarding of imperial honours to citizens of a realm, including knighthoods and damehoods, does not necessarily prevent a citizen of a Commonwealth realm from receiving a substantive award of an imperial honour for service in the United Kingdom or to its government. There continue to be numerous examples of Canadians, New Zealanders, and Australians who the British government have honored and can use the honour or its accompanying style when they are resident in their own nation or the United Kingdom.

== Honorary awards ==
Citizens of countries that do not have the King as their head of state sometimes have honours conferred upon them, in which case the awards are "honorary". In the case of knighthoods, the holders are entitled to place initials after their name but not style themselves "Sir" as they are not entitled to receive the accolade. Examples of non-subjects with honorary knighthoods are Billy Graham, Bill Gates, Bob Geldof, Bono, Steven Spielberg, John Williams and Rudolph Giuliani, while foreigners Arsène Wenger and Gérard Houllier are honorary OBEs. Honorary knighthoods are of Orders of Chivalry rather than as Knights Bachelor as the latter confers no postnominal letters.

Recipients of honorary awards who later become subjects of His Majesty may apply to convert their awards to substantive ones. Examples of this are Marjorie Scardino, American CEO of Pearson PLC, and Yehudi Menuhin, the American-born violinist and conductor. They were granted an honorary damehood and knighthood respectively while still American citizens, and converted them to substantive awards after they assumed British nationality, becoming Dame Marjorie and Sir Yehudi. Menuhin later accepted a life peerage with the title Lord Menuhin.

Sir Tony O'Reilly, who held both British and Irish nationality, (Note: A person born in the Republic of Ireland before 1949 who holds British nationality may be either a British subject or a British citizen. British subject status is not full British citizenship but confers equal entitlement to a substantive honour.) used the style "Sir", but had also gained approval from the Irish Government to accept the award as is necessary under the Irish Constitution. Elisabeth Schwarzkopf, the German soprano, became entitled to be known as "Dame Elisabeth" when she took British nationality. Irish-born Sir Terry Wogan was initially awarded an honorary knighthood, but by the time he collected the accolade from the Queen in December 2005, he had obtained dual nationality and the award was upgraded to a substantive knighthood.

Bob Geldof is often erroneously referred to as "Sir Bob"; he is not entitled to this style as an honorary knight, as he is a citizen of the Republic of Ireland (i.e., he is not a citizen of a Commonwealth realm).

There is no law in the UK preventing non-citizens from retaining a hereditary peerage, e.g., for a century Americans held the title Lords Fairfax of Cameron but then became naturalised British seated peers, and also a foreign citizen of Italy is currently the unseated Earl of Newburgh. Originally only Commonwealth and Irish citizens were eligible to sit in the House of Lords, however, after the royal assent of Hereditary Peers Act of 2026, all hereditary peers, elected or otherwise, are forever removed the House of Lords. This was never tested under the previous arrangements. However, some other countries have laws restricting the acceptances of awards granted to would-be recipients by foreign powers. In Canada, where the House of Commons of Canada (but not the Senate of Canada) has opposed the granting of titular honours with its (non-binding) Nickle Resolution, then Prime Minister Jean Chrétien advised the Queen not to grant Conrad Black a titular honour while he remained a Canadian citizen (see Black v Chrétien).

== Ceremony ==
Each year, around 2,600 people receive their awards personally from the monarch or another member of the Royal Family. The majority of investitures take place at Buckingham Palace, but an annual ceremony also takes place at the Palace of Holyroodhouse in Edinburgh (during Holyrood Week), and some happen at Windsor Castle. There are approximately 120 recipients at each Investiture. In recent years the King, the Prince of Wales and The Princess Royal have all held investitures.

During the ceremony, the monarch enters the ballroom of Buckingham Palace attended by two Gurkha orderly officers, a tradition begun in 1876 by Queen Victoria. On duty on the dais are five members of the King's Body Guard of the Yeomen of the Guard, which was created in 1485 by Henry VII; they are the oldest, but not most senior, military corps in the United Kingdom. Three Lady or Gentleman Ushers are on duty to help look after the recipients and their guests.

The King or his representative is escorted by either the Lord Chamberlain or the Lord Steward. After the national anthem has been played, he stands to the right of the King and announces the name of each recipient and the achievement for which they are being decorated. The King or his representative is provided with a brief background for each recipient by their equerry as they approach to receive their decorations.

Men who are to be knighted kneel on an investiture stool to receive the accolade, which the King bestows. Elizabeth II used the sword used by her father, George VI as Duke of York and Colonel of the Scots Guards. Only men are knighted. Women receive their honours in the same fashion as men receiving decorations or medals, even if they are receiving a damehood. Occasionally, an award for gallantry may be made posthumously and in this case, the King or his representative presents the decoration or medal to the recipient's next-of-kin in private before the public investiture begins. The Elizabeth Cross was created especially for this purpose.

After the investiture ceremony, those honoured are ushered out of the ballroom into the Inner Quadrangle of Buckingham Palace, where the royal rota's photographers are stationed. Here, recipients are photographed with their awards. In some cases, members of the press may interview some of the more well-known people who have been honoured.

== Refusal ==
In 2003, The Sunday Times published a list of almost 300 people who had declined an honour between 1951 and 1999. In 2020, The Guardian reported based on a Freedom of Information request, that the number of people refusing an honour had more than doubled in the previous nine years.

=== Notable examples ===
- Outgoing prime ministers:
  - Neville Chamberlain declined an earldom and appointment as Knight Companion of the Garter.
  - Sir Winston Churchill declined a dukedom in order to remain in the House of Commons and to allow his son Randolph Churchill a political career.
  - Sir Edward Heath declined a life peerage in order to remain in the House of Commons.
  - Sir John Major declined a life peerage, saying elevation to the House of Lords was incompatible with retirement from politics.
  - Sir Tony Blair declined a life peerage.
  - Gordon Brown declined a life peerage.
- Joseph Conrad, novelist
- John Cleese declined appointment as CBE and later declined a life peerage.
- Frank Pick declined both a knighthood and a peerage.
- T. E. Lawrence declined a knighthood, as he felt that Britain had betrayed the Arabs.
- David Bowie declined appointment as CBE in 2000, then declined a knighthood in 2003, stating, "It's not what I spent my life working for."
- Graham Greene, novelist
- Stephen Hawking, physicist, reportedly turned down a knighthood because he "does not like titles."
- Benjamin Zephaniah declined appointment as OBE, describing it as a legacy of colonialism.
- George Bernard Shaw declined appointment as OM, replying that "merit" in authorship could only be determined by the posthumous verdict of history.
- Honor Blackman declined appointment as CBE, as she was a republican.
- Albert Finney, actor (in 2000; had previously declined appointment as CBE in 1980).
- John Lennon returned his MBE insignia (awarded in 1965) in 1969, although no official provision exists for renouncing an honour.
- Geraldine McEwan declined a damehood.
- Vanessa Redgrave declined a damehood in 1999, but accepted it in 2022. She also accepted appointment as CBE in 1967.
- Gareth Peirce declined appointment as CBE.
- Rabindranath Tagore resigned his knighthood in protest against the Jallianwala Bagh – one of the bloodiest massacres in Indian and British histories.

== Revocation ==
Honours are sometimes revoked (forfeited), for example if a recipient is subsequently convicted of a serious criminal offence. The Honours Forfeiture Committee is an ad hoc committee convened under the chairmanship of the Head of the Home Civil Service, to consider cases where information has been received which indicates an individual is unsuitable to hold an award. Sometimes the original decision to grant an honour was made on the basis of inaccurate information (including through manipulation of the public nominations system), but normally cases relate to actions that took place after the award was made. Recommendations are made to the monarch of the United Kingdom, who has the sole authority to rescind an honour.

In 2009, Gordon Brown confirmed that the process remains as set out in 1994 by the then Prime Minister John Major in a written answer to the House of Commons:

The statutes of most orders of knighthood and the royal warrants of decorations and medals include provision for the Queen to "cancel and annul" appointments and awards. Cancellation is considered in cases where retention of the appointment or award would bring the honours system into disrepute. There are no set guidelines for cancellations, which are considered on a case-by-case basis. Since 1979, the London Gazette has published details of cancellations of 15 appointments and awards—three knighthoods, one CBE, five OBEs, four MBEs and two BEMs.

In October 2016, the House of Commons approved a motion to ask the Honours Forfeiture Committee to strip Sir Philip Green of his knighthood for his role in the downfall of British Home Stores. It was the first time MPs voted to recommend rescinding a knighthood.

=== Notable examples ===
- Kaiser Wilhelm II was a Knight Companion of the Garter prior to the start of the First World War, when it was revoked.
- Roger Casement had been honoured for his human rights work while a British diplomat; however, upon being convicted on 30 June 1916 of High Treason for his role in the Irish 1916 Easter Rising, the King directed that Casement would cease to be a member of the Order of St Michael and St George, his name being stricken from the register, and letters patent were also issued "degrading" him "from the degree, title and dignity of Knight Bachelor". He was executed that August.
- Benito Mussolini was stripped of his honorary knighthood after Italy declared war on the United Kingdom in 1940.
- Anthony Blunt, knighted as Surveyor of the Queen's Pictures for his services to Art, lost his knighthood in the 1980s when he was revealed to be the "Fourth Man" in the early 1950s Burgess and Maclean spying scandal which also touched on the 1960s Philby spying affair, as a result of which he confessed to the security services. Although Blunt was never charged or convicted, the honour was withdrawn on the advice of the then Prime Minister, Margaret Thatcher.
- Nicolae Ceaușescu forfeited his honorary knighthood that he earlier received for his friendship with Western democracies.
- Albert Henry was the former Premier of the Cook Islands. He was later convicted of electoral fraud in the 1980s.
- Terry Lewis, knighted for his services to Queensland police, was stripped of his knighthood in 1993 after being sentenced to prison on charges of corruption and forgery as a result of the findings of the Fitzgerald Inquiry.
- Jack Lyons, who had received his knighthood for his huge charitable donations and services to industry, lost it when he was convicted of fraud in the 1980s.
- Robert Mugabe was stripped of his honorary GCB after calls from the Government to the Royal Family due to the crisis in Zimbabwe under his régime, including hyperinflation, and violence in the 2008 presidential elections.
- Lester Piggott, the high-profile jockey, had his OBE removed after being convicted and sentenced to imprisonment for tax evasion.
- Fred Goodwin, the former CEO of Royal Bank of Scotland, had his knighthood annulled, after the Financial Services Authority found that the failure of RBS had an important role in the 2008 financial crisis, because Goodwin was the dominant decision maker at the time.
- James Crosby, former CEO of HBOS and non-executive director of the Financial Services Authority, was stripped of his knighthood at his request in April 2013 as the result of the bank's collapse during the UK financial crisis.
- Ronald Brierley, New Zealand investor and corporate raider, chairman and director of a number of companies in Australia, New Zealand and the UK. In April 2021, Brierley pleaded guilty to three counts of possessing child abuse material and resigned his 1988 knighthood after the New Zealand government had initiated the process of having it removed.

== Order of Wear ==
Honours, decorations and medals are arranged in the "Order of Wear", an official list which describes the order in which they should be worn. Updates to the Order of Wear are published in The London Gazette when necessary. The current Order of Wear was published on 11 January 2019. Additional information on the social events at which an award may be worn is contained in the insignia case given to each recipient.

The list places the Victoria Cross and George Cross at the top, followed by the orders of knighthood arranged in order of date of creation. Below the Knights of the Garter and Thistle, individuals of a higher rank precede those of a lower rank. For instance, a Knight Grand Cross of any order precedes any Knight Commander. For those of equal rank, members of the higher-ranked Order take precedence. Within the same Order, precedence is accorded to that individual who received the honour earlier.

Not all orders have the same number of ranks. The Order of Merit, the Order of the Companions of Honour, the Distinguished Service Order and the Imperial Service Order are slightly different, being single-rank honours, and have been placed at appropriate positions of seniority. The precedence of Knight Bachelor is below the knights of the different orders and above those with the rank of Commander or lower.

Decorations are followed by medals of various categories, being arranged in date order within each section. These are followed by Commonwealth and honorary foreign awards of any level. Miscellaneous details are explained in notes at the bottom of the list.

The order of wear is not connected to and should not be confused with the order of precedence.

== Style ==
For peers, see forms of address in the United Kingdom.

For baronets, the style Sir John Smith, Bt (or Bart) is used. Their wives are styled Lady Smith. A baronetess is styled Dame Jane Smith, Btss.

For knights, the style Sir John Smith [postnominals] is used, attaching the proper postnominal letters depending on rank and order (for knights bachelor, no postnominal letters are used). Their wives are styled Lady Smith, with no postnominal letters. A dame is styled Dame Jane Smith, [postnominals]. More familiar references or oral addresses use the first name only, e.g. Sir John, or Dame Joan.

Wives of knights and baronets are styled Lady Smith, although customarily no courtesy title is automatically reciprocated to male consorts.

Recipients of orders, decorations and medals receive no styling of Sir or Dame, but they may attach the according postnominal letters to their name, e.g., John Smith, VC. Recipients of gallantry awards may be referred to in Parliament as "gallant", in addition to "honourable", "noble", etc.: The honourable and gallant Gentleman.

Bailiffs or Dames Grand Cross (GCStJ), Knights/Dames of Justice/Grace (KStJ/DStJ), Commander Brothers/Sisters (CStJ), Officer Brothers/Sisters (OStJ), Serving Brothers/Sisters (SBStJ/SSStJ), and Esquires (EsqStJ) of the Order of St John do not receive any special styling with regards to prenominal address i.e. Sir or Dame. They may, however, attach the relevant postnominal initials (solely) within internal correspondence of the Order. In the Priory of Australia, Canada and the United States, the rank of Serving Brother/Sister is no longer granted. The rank now awarded is referred to as Member of the Order of St John for both men and women.

For honours bestowed upon those in the entertainment industry (e.g., Anthony Hopkins, Maggie Smith), it is an accepted practice to omit the title for professional credits.

== Reform ==
Reforms of the system occur from time to time. In the last century notable changes to the system have included a Royal Commission in 1925 following the scandal in which Prime Minister David Lloyd George was found to be selling honours. The sale of British Honours, including titles, is now prohibited by the Honours (Prevention of Abuses) Act 1925.

A significant set of reforms were enacted in 1993 under the Conservative Prime Minister John Major, with the intention of providing a more merits-based system for honouring service and achievement. Among other outcomes, this removed the rank distinctions that were explicitly linked to certain military awards, and ended (with the exception of High Court Judges) the awarding of ex officio honours. The reforms also provided for people to be nominated for an honour by members of the public, as well as placing more emphasis within the system on recognising and rewarding voluntary service in particular.

In July 2004, the Public Administration Select Committee (PASC) of the House of Commons and, concurrently, Sir Hayden Phillips, Permanent Secretary at the Department of Constitutional Affairs, both concluded reviews of the system. The PASC recommended some radical changes; Sir Hayden concentrated on issues of procedure and transparency. In February 2005, the Government responded to both reviews by issuing a Command paper detailing which of the proposed changes it had accepted. These included diversifying and opening up the system of honours selection committees for the Prime Minister's list and also the introduction of a miniature badge. Furthermore, the 2004 review suggested a regular report on the transparency and operation of the system at a suggested frequency of every 3 years. These reviews have taken place in 2008, 2011, 2014, 2018 and 2023. The most recent review covers the period 2019 to 2023 and shows a notable shift towards community and voluntary recognition, and a continued emphasis on ensuring that the Honours System reflects British societal diversity.

As of 2012, same-sex civil partners of individual recipients of British honours are not themselves granted honours by way of their partnered relation. In July 2012, Conservative MP Oliver Colvile introduced a private member's bill, titled "Honours (Equality of Titles for Partners) Bill", to amend the honours system to both allow husbands of those made dames and for civil partners of recipients to receive honours by their relationship statuses.

In May 2020, a special COVID nomination process was introduced to provide a more streamlined consideration process and accessible route for the public to nominate those in society who had responded to the COVID-19 pandemic. Compared with the existing public nomination form, it required substantially less information in order to be accepted and processed. This process was ended in May 2022.

== Controversies ==
A scandal in the 1920s was the sale by Maundy Gregory of honours and peerages to raise political funds for David Lloyd George.

In 1976, the Harold Wilson era was mired by controversy over the 1976 Prime Minister's Resignation Honours, which became known as the "Lavender List".

In 2006, The Sunday Times revealed that every donor who had given £1,000,000 or more to the Labour Party since 1997 was given a Knighthood or a Peerage (see Cash-for-Honours scandal). Moreover, the government had given honours to 12 of the 14 individuals who have donated more than £200,000 to Labour and of the 22 who donated more than £100,000, 17 received honours. An investigation by the Crown Prosecution Service did not lead to any charges being made.

The Times published an analysis of the recipients of honours in December 2015 which showed that 46% of those getting knighthoods and above in 2015 had been to fee-paying public schools. In 1955 it was 50%. Only 6.55% of the population attends such schools. 27% had been to Oxford or Cambridge universities (18% in 1955).

== See also ==
- British nobility
- Mentioned in dispatches
- Awards and decorations of the British Armed Forces
- Orders of precedence in the United Kingdom
- United Kingdom honours order of wearing
- Orders, decorations, and medals of the Commonwealth realms
  - Orders, decorations, and medals of Australia
  - Orders, decorations, and medals of Canada
  - Orders, decorations, and medals of New Zealand
- Orders, decorations, and medals of Hong Kong
