= Kyaw Win (general) =

Burmese general

Lieutenant General Maha Tharay Sithu Kyaw Win
- ကျော်ဝင်း

Chief of the Defense Service Training
- In office ?–?

Chief of Bureau of Special Operations 2
- In office ?–2008

Personal details
- Born: 3 January 1944 (age 82) Burma
- Spouse: San San Yee
- Education: Defence Services Academy

Military service
- Allegiance: Burma
- Branch/service: Myanmar Army
- Years of service: ?–2008
- Rank: Lieutenant General
- Commands: Northern Military Region in Myitkyina

Lt Gen. Maha Tharay Sithu Kyaw Win (Burmese: ကျော်ဝင်း; born 3 January 1944) is a Burmese military officer and retired lieutenant general in the Myanmar Army, who served as Chief of Defense Service Training. He also served as Chief of Bureau of Special Operations 2 for Shan State and Kayah State.

== Military career ==
He was appointed as Tactical Operations Commander No.1 of the Eastern Military Region under Vice-Senior General Maung Aye in 1988. He later commanded MOC-12 (Kawkareik) and the Northern Military Region in Myitkyina, Kachin State. In November 1997, he was appointed a member of the State Peace and Development Council.

Burma's military establishment has a total of five officers in its Bureau of Special Operations (BSO). Kyaw Win is one of the five BSO officers, and retired with the other four, in order to make way for the newly transferred officers. He retired the Myanmar Army at the rank of Lieutenant general in June 2008.

== Sources ==
- "Burma's Rulers II - The Next Generation". Burma Library. May 1, 2003.
- "Lt-General Kyaw Win on inspection tour of Eastern Shan State" (PDF). The New Light of Myanmar. November 23, 2007.
- "Lt-Gen Kyaw Win visits Lawpita Hydro-electric Power Stations 1&2" (PDF). The New Light of Myanmar. February 11, 2007.
