= Manutha Kyaw Win =

Burmese novelist and writer (born 1945)

Kyaw Win
- ကျော်ဝင်း
- Born: 3 June 1945 (age 81); Myitkyina, Kachin State, Myanmar
- Education: Yangon University
- Occupation: Writer
- Writing career
- Pen name: Manutha Kyaw Win
- Notable awards: Myanmar National Literature Award 1977

Manutha Kyaw Win (Burmese: မနုဿကျော်ဝင်း, lit. 'Kyaw Win the anthropologist'; born 3 June 1945, Kyaw Win) is a Burmese novelist and writer. He has written over 400 research papers, novels and articles. He was awarded the Myanmar National Literature Award for Nout Aww Naga in 1977.

== Early life and education ==
Kyaw Win, the eldest of five siblings, was born on 3 June 1945 in Myitkyina, Kachin State.

In 1968, he worked as a tutor at Yangon University from which he completed his bachelor's and a master's degree in anthropology.

== Careers ==
At the beginning of his writing career, he wrote novels and books under the pen names 'University Win Thu', Shwe Aoe Lay, Hla Myint, and Maung Win Nwe (Yangon University). Based on his anthropological studies, he changed his pen name to Manutha Kyaw Win in 1968. He wrote about his field experience as articles and short stories in the press. He has written over 400 research papers, novels, and articles. It was also broadcast on the MRTV's Culture and Arts program. Until 1968, he worked as a tutor at Yangon University, and he transferred to the Department of Culture in 1969.

In 1973, he won the Thutapadetha Prize for his manuscript, 'Basic Archeology' in the competition for the Sarpay Beikman Manuscript Awards. In 1975, he also received the Full Length Novel Award for his novel, Where is the university. He won the Myanmar National Literature Award again for his book Nout Aww Naga in 1977. He was awarded the Sarpay Beikman of Literature Prize for his manuscript "Rough travel, strange tradition" in 1979 and Pakokku U Ohn Pe Full Length Novel award for Aoe Chanpae Myar That Thay Htarr in 1955. He has authored six books, five of which have won awards.

In 2001, he published a book, Basic Museum.

== Published books ==
- Basic Museum (2001)
- Nout Aww Naga (1977)
- Rough travel, strange tradition (1976)
- Where is the university? (1975)
- Basic Archeology (1973)
- Aoe Chanpae Myar That Thay Htarr (1955)
