= Salwe =

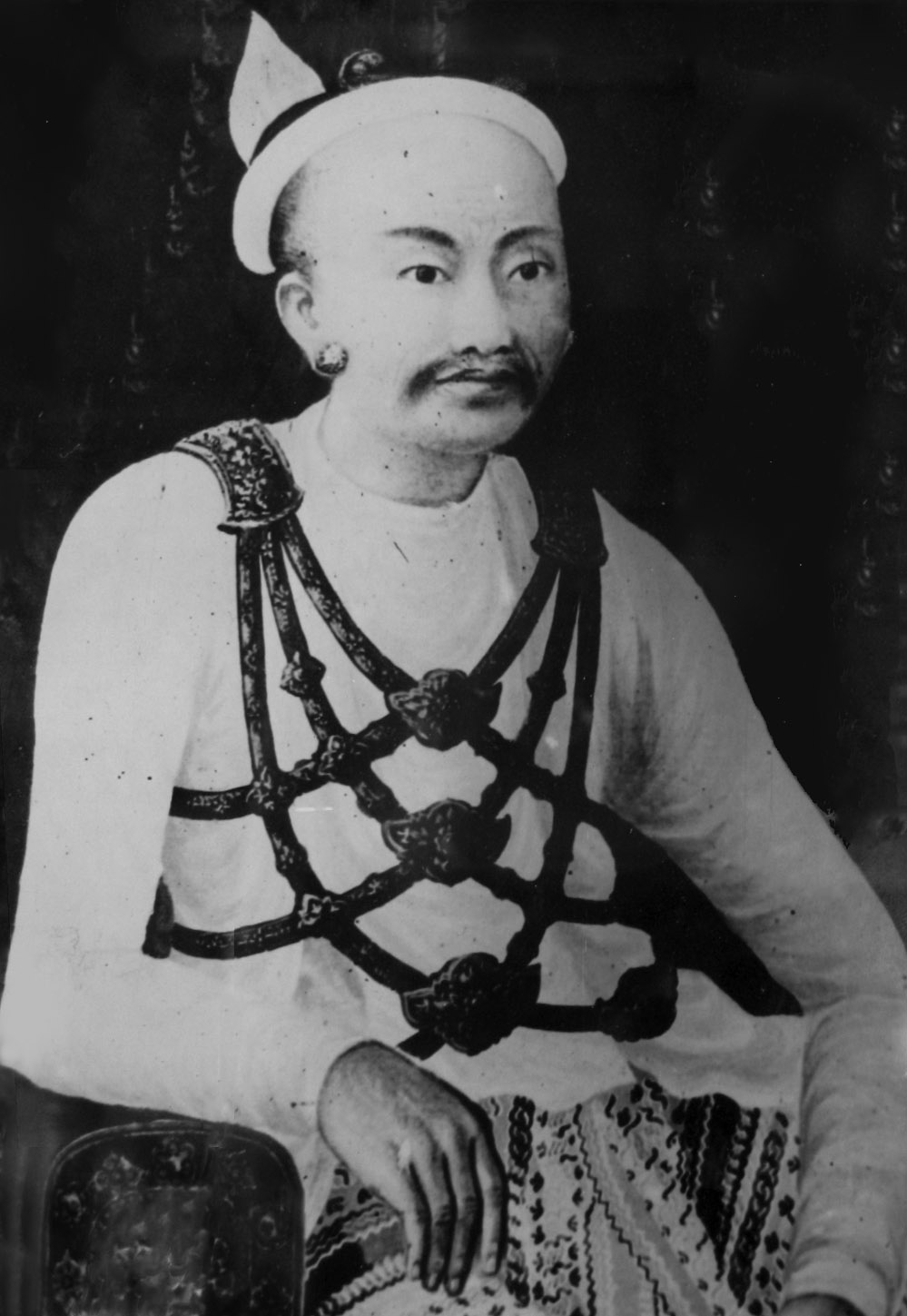
Salwe on Mindon Min's shirt

Salwe (Burmese: စလွယ်, [səlwɛ̀]) are issues for Burmese orders. A salwe is a shoulder-belt formed with metal chains, normally fashioned in gold or silver, which are fastened in four places, in shields or bosses, and worn over the shoulder like an officer's sash.

The Burmese monarchy used the salwe was purely secular, as it was used to recognize merit and service to the state.

== Etymology and origins ==
The Burmese language word salwe စလွယ် is a corruption of the Hindi term janeu (जनेऊ). Janeu (also known as upanayana) in Hindi, refers to a sacred investiture or Brahminical cord found in the higher castes of Hindu society.

It is of ancient Burmese origin. The salwe is referenced in the Salwedin Sadan (Book of the Order), a Burmese text that states the number of salwe cords that members of each of the four Hindu varnas wore:

1. Rulers (Khattiya) - 9 cords
2. Ritualists (Brahmana) - 6 cords
3. Merchants (Vessa) - 1-3 cords
4. Commoners (Sudda) - none

== Usage ==
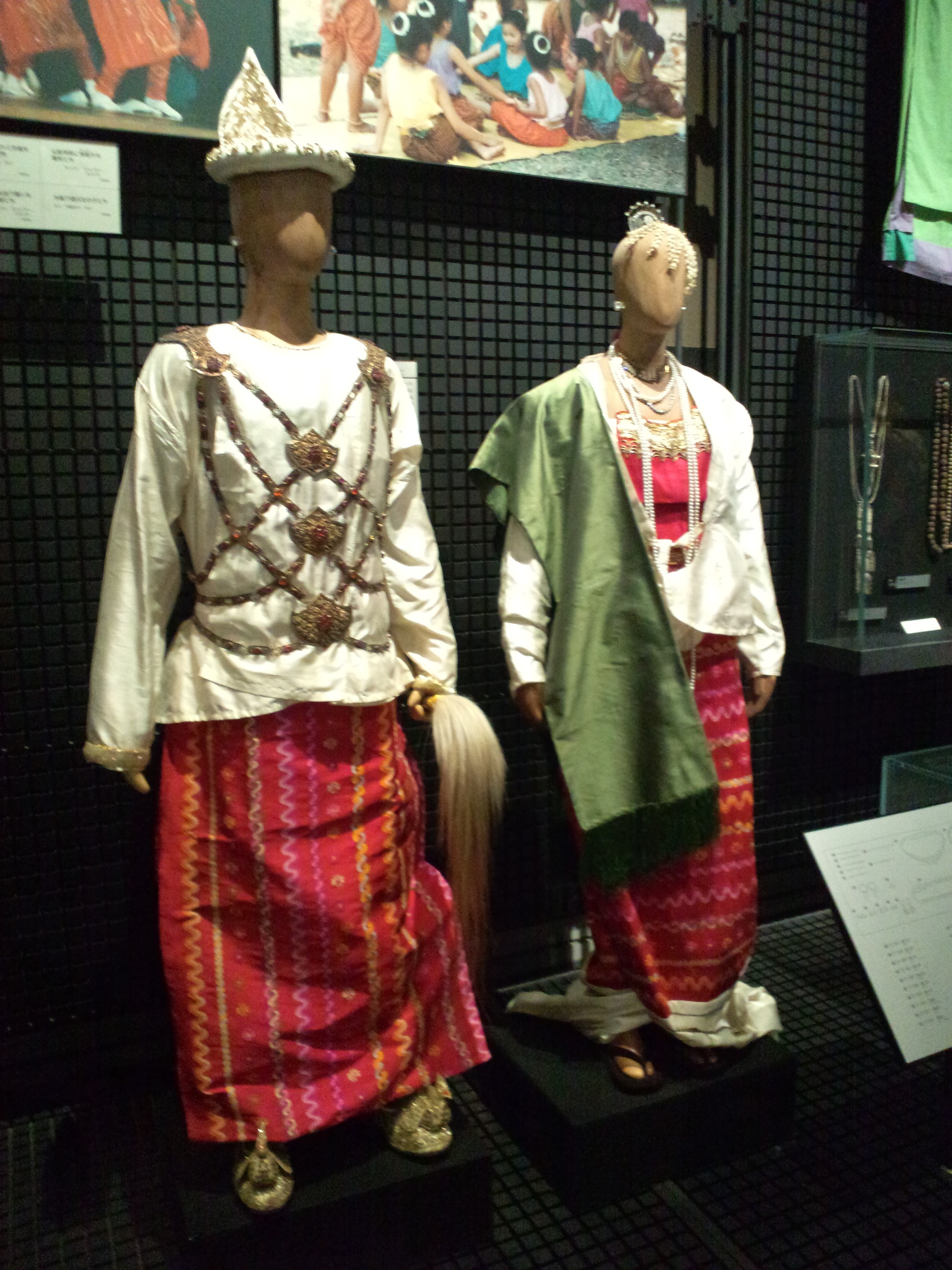
Salwe as seen at the National Museum of Ethnology, Osaka

The number of strands or threads indicates rank in the order. The salwe was worn as a symbol of high character, to maintain the purity of character of one's family or caste.

During the Konbaung Dynasty, high-ranking ministers with immunity from various forms of execution (thetdawshay) also wore salwe of 18 strands. The following is a list of Konbaung-era grades and the corresponding number of salwe strands conferred:

Grades during the Konbaung dynasty
Grade	Number of strands
King	24
Crown Prince	21
Shan Sawbwas, Princes of the Blood	18
Shan Myosas, other Royal Family Members	15
High-ranking Ministers (Mugyi, Matgyi)	12
Lower-ranking Ministers (Mulat, Matlat, Mu-nge, Matnge)	3-9

== Current usage ==
The following salwes are currently issued by the Government of Burma:

- Pyidaungsu Sithu Thingaha
- Thiri Thudhamma Thingaha
