= Maha Tharay Sithu =

Honor of the Order of the Union of Burma

Awarded by President
- Type: Order of Pyidaungsu Sithu
- Established: 2 September 1948
- Country: Myanmar
- Ribbon

Precedence
- Next (higher): Sado Maha Thray Sithu
- Next (lower): Thray Sithu

Maha Tharay Sithu (Burmese: မဟာသရေစည်သူ) is one of the five honors of the Order of the Union of Burma and is a third class honor. On 4 January 1948, after the establishment of a sovereign and independent Union of Burma, the President of the Union Government has introduced a new system of annual awards in commemoration of Independence Day.

Maha Thray Sithu to Chao Pha, Ministers, Ministers of the Supreme Court and Outstanding State Officials were awarded.

== Recipients ==
- U Thant, Former Secretary-General of the United Nations
- Myoma U Ba Lwin (1951)
- Pe Khin, a Burmese diplomat.
- U Kya Pu, Panglong Agreement Public Representative
- Secretary-General Khin Maung Phyu (1949)
- Dr. Ba Han
- Min Nyo (1958)
- Brigadier General Aung Gyi
- Brigadier General Maung Maung Kyaw Win
- Chatichai Choonhavan, Thai prime minister
- U Sein, Chief Minister of Kayah State from 1948 to 1960
- Lieutenant General Tin Oo
- Min Aung Hlaing
