= Order of Burma =

British Burma order of merit

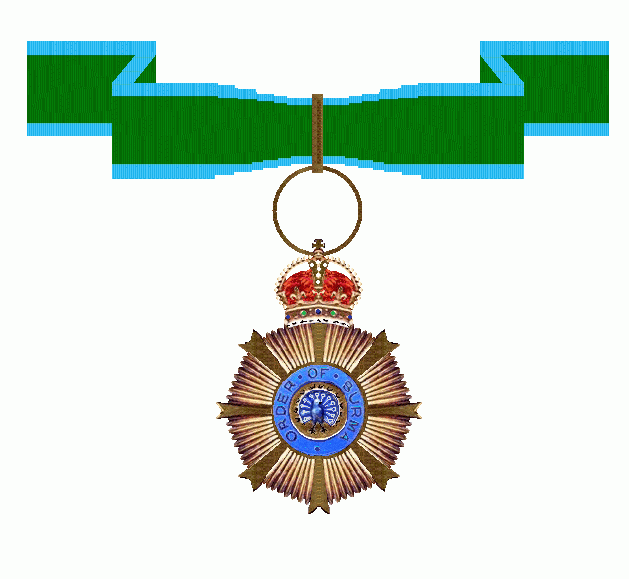
- Badge of the order
- Type: Colonial order
- Established: 10 May 1940
- Country: British Burma
- Awarded for: Long, faithful and honourable service, and later gallantry, by members of the armed forces in Burma
- Status: Dormant order
- Grades: Member (OB)

Statistics
- Total inductees: 24 for long and loyal service
- Ribbon of the Order

The Order of Burma was founded by Royal Warrant on 10 May 1940, and conferred in a single class. It was awarded by the Governor of British Burma for long, faithful and honourable service by Governor's Commissioned (i.e. native Burmese) Officers in the Burma Army, the Burma Frontier Force and the Burma Military Police. In September 1945 the royal warrant was amended to permit awards of the order for gallantry.

In 1937 Burmese officers had ceased to be eligible for the Order of British India when Burma became a distinct colony, separate from British India. The Order of Burma was, effectively, a replacement for the Order of British India and was awarded on similar terms.

When established, there was a fixed establishment of twenty eight members, sixteen for the Burma Army, and twelve for the Burma Frontier Force and Military Police, with vacancies filled once annually as they occurred. The award carried an allowance of one rupee a day for life, unless forfeited by misconduct.

Recipients were entitled to the post-nominal letters OB. Only 24 Burmese officers were ever made members of the order for long and loyal service.

The badge of the order consisted of a gold rayed circle, 39 millimetres (1.5 in) in diameter, surmounted by an Imperial crown, with a central roundel showing a peacock displaying his tail, surrounded by the words ‘ORDER OF BURMA’. It was worn from a neck ribbon of dark green edged with light blue.

The government of post-independence Burma created the Pyidaungsu Sithu Thingaha, (or Order of the Union of Burma) to replace the Order of Burma on 2 September 1948.

== Bibliography ==
- Dorling, H. Taprell (1956). Ribbons and Medals. London: A. H. Baldwin & Son.
- Duckers, Peter (2009) [2004]. British Orders and Decorations. Oxford: Shire Publications. ISBN 978-0-7478-0580-9. OCLC 55587484.
- Mussell, John W. (2015). Medal Yearbook 2015. Honiton, Devon: Token Publishing Limited. ISBN 978-1-908-828-16-3.
