= Order of the Union of Burma =

Highest civilian award of Myanmar

Order of the Union of Burma (Pyidaungsu Sithu Thingaha)
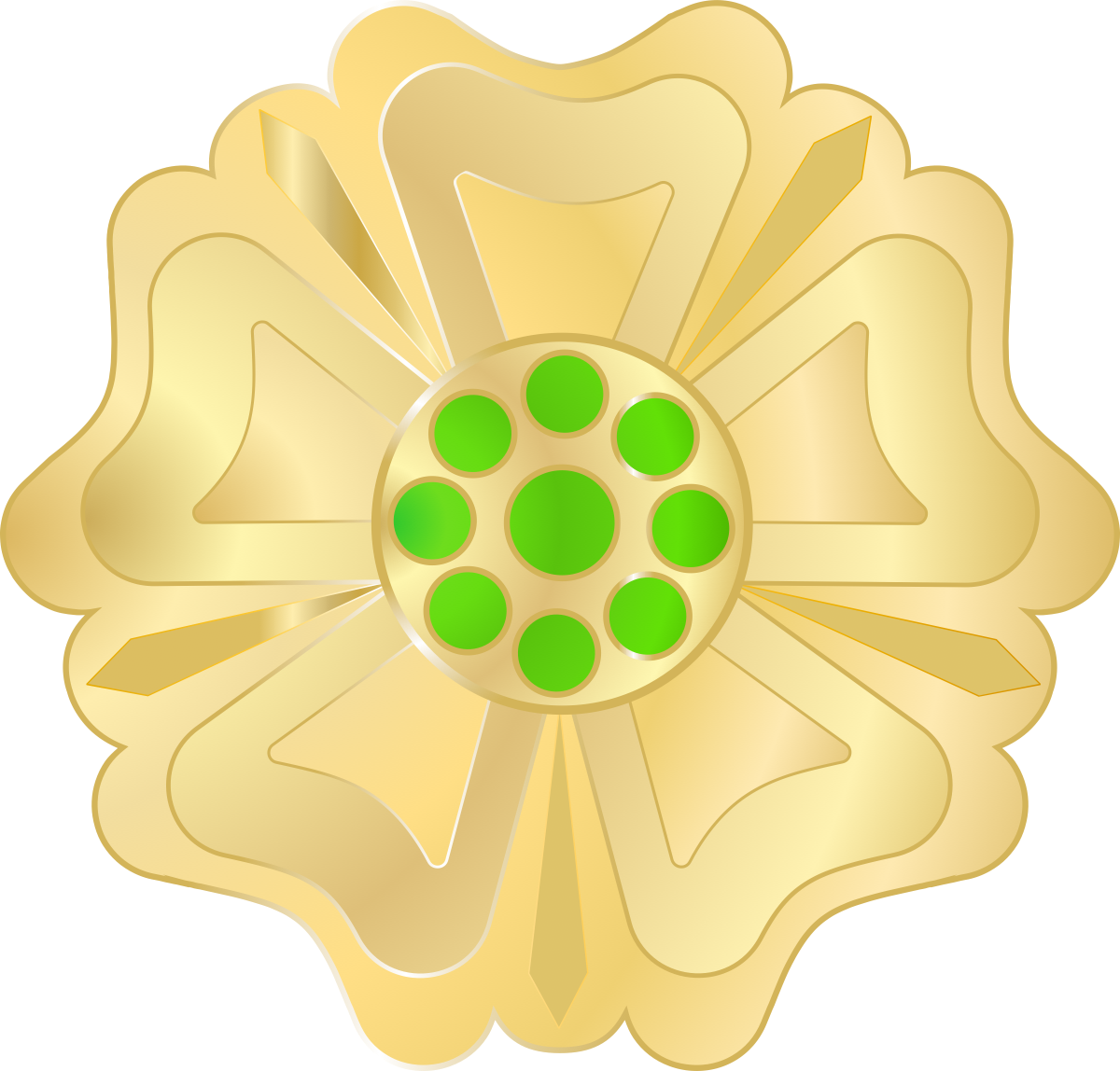
- Established: 2 September 1948
- Country: Myanmar
- Grades: Grand Commander; Grand Officer; Commander; Officer; Member
- / Ribbon bar of the Order of the Union of Burma (military and civilian member)

The Order of the Union of Myanmar (Burmese: ပြည်ထောင်စုစည်သူသင်္ဂဟ [pjìdàʊɰ̃zṵ sìθù θɪ̀ɰ̃ɡəha̰]) is the highest civilian decoration bestowed by the government of Myanmar (also known as Burma).

The order was founded on 2 September 1948 as a replacement for the British Order of Burma. The original order had been founded by Royal Warrant on 10 May 1940. The title Pyidaungsu Sithu Thingaha may be used by the awardee.

== Award classes ==
The Order of the Union of Burma is awarded in two divisions (military and civil) and each of these is split into five classes:

1. အဂ္ဂမဟာသရေစည်သူ Agga Maha Thray Sithu - Grand Commander
2. သတိုးမဟာသရေစည်သူ Thado Maha Thray Sithu - Grand Officer
3. မဟာသရေစည်သူ Maha Thray Sithu - Commander
4. သရေစည်သူ Thray Sithu - Officer
5. စည်သူ Sithu - Member

The first class consists of a gold braided salwe worn across the breast with the badge of the order suspended. It is decorated with a large gold and enamelled breast star surrounded by five small stars.

2nd class honors have a single breast star that is smaller than the first class version.

3rd class honors have a badge, worn from a ribbon around the neck.

== Recipients ==
Recipients of the order include:

=== Agga Maha Thray Sithu ===
Recipient	Year received	Note
Thein Sein	2012	
Sao Shwe Thaik	?	
Min Aung Hlaing	2022	
Ne Win	2022	

=== Maha Thray Sithu ===
Recipient	Year received	Note
U Thant	1961	
Khin Maung Phyu	1961	
Lt-Gen Maung Bo	2012	
Lt-Gen Tin Oo	2012	
Lt-Gen Soe Win	2012	
Brigadier Aung Gyi	1962	

=== Thray Sithu ===
Recipient	Year received	Note
Maj-Gen Thura Thiha Thura Sit Maung	2012	
Lt-Gen Kyaw Than	2012	
Aung Ko Win	2020	
Vice Senior General Soe Win	2022	

=== Sithu ===
Recipient	Year received	Note
Tin Tin Mya	2012	Singer
Khin Maung Nyunt	2012	
San Yin (San Shar Tin)	2012	
Dr. Kyaw Sein	2012	
Kyi Soe Tun	2012	
Myint Myint Khin	2012	
Shwe Nan Tin	2012	
Ledwinthar Saw Chit	2013	
Nwae Nwae San	2012	

== See also ==
- Order of Burma
- Thiri Thudhamma Thingaha
- Salwe
