= Hainggyi Island =

Hainggyi Island, also spelt Haigyi Island may refer to:

- Hainggyi Island (town), a town located in the Ayeyarwady Division of south west Burma
- Hainggyi Island (island), an island located in the Ayeyarwady Division of south west Burma
- Hainggyikyun Subtownship, an unofficial statistical and administration unit within Ngapudaw Township
