= Lemyethna Township =

Township in Ayeyawady Region, Myanmar

Lemyethna Township လေးမျက်နှာမြို့နယ်
- Township
- Location in Hinthada district
- Coordinates: 17.63°N 95.02°E
- Country: Myanmar
- Region: Ayeyarwady Region
- District: Hinthada District
- Capital: Lemyethna

Area
  - Total: 399.04 sq mi (1,033.5 km^{2})
- Highest elevation: 6,820 ft (2,080 m)
- Lowest elevation: 66 ft (20 m)

Population (2023)
  - Total: 108,132
  - Density: 270.98/sq mi (104.63/km^{2})
  - Ethnicities: Bamar; Karen
  - Religions: Buddhism; Christianity
- Time zone: UTC+6:30 (MMT)

Lemyethna or Laymyethna Township (Burmese: လေးမျက်နှာမြို့နယ်) is a township of Hinthada District in northern Ayeyarwady Region, Myanmar. The only town and principal town is Lemyethna.

The township borders Yegyi Township and Kyonpyaw Township of Kyonpyaw District to the south, Gwa Township of Rakhine State to the west and Ingapu Township of Myanaung District to the north. To the east, it borders the rest of Hinthada District, bordering Hinthada Township. The township has one town with five wards and 43 village tracts grouping together 284 villages.

== History ==
During the conquest of Hanthawaddy by King Alaungpaya, the Konbaung troops discovered a stupa with four gates pointing in the cardinal directions originally constructed by Binnya Dala. The Burmese named it Lemyethna (literally, Four Faces) Pagoda. In 1891, Lemyethna Townshipwas moved to out of Henzada District, before being returned to the district in 1901, where it remains to this day. On 15 September 1993, due to the increased usage of Ngawun River for transportation, the village around this area grew in size before becoming officially designated as a town in 1998 by the Ministry of Home Affairs.

However, there are records of the township's existence as early as 1903 when the British commissioner received a petition against a myo-ok (town administrator) for alleged tax evasion.

== Geography ==
Lemyethna Township lies on the Irrawaddy Delta and is centred around the Ngawun River, which runs north–south through the township. 21 of the town's village tracts lie to the east of the township, which is densely populated flat lowlands, and the remaining 22 village tracts lie in the hilly foothills of the Arakan Mountains to the west of the Ngawun. The streams within the township are entirely freshwater, allowing for ample drinking, transportation and irrigation uses. The township has a hot and rainy climate with an average rainfall of 88.7 inches (225 cm) over an average of 80.6 rainy days a year. The lowest temperate and highest temperatures per year over the 2018-2023 period were 10.5 °C and 39.2 °C respectively.

The Lemyethna Forest Reserve covers 44% of the township with 112,550 acres (455.5 km^{2}) of protected state-owned forest covering the township's western half. 2,602 acres (10.53 km^{2}) of this area is reserved for hardwood forests, cultivating economically important teak and Pyinkado trees. The township has additional forested areas, mostly west of the Ngawun, containing various trees including padauk and bamboo forests. These preserved forests are home to various fauna like wild hogs, gaur, deer and monkeys.

The township is located on the extreme-south of the Rakhine-Chin-Naga ranges where sediment-hosted stratabound deposits formed in the volcanic-sea water interface. Of interest to the economy, are copper mineralization deposits that formed in the area.

== Demographics ==
Historical Population
Year	Lemyethna Township	±%
1973		—
1983		—
2014	103,024	—
2018	109,776	+6.6%
2019	110,080	+0.3%
2022	110,786	+0.6%
2023	108,132	−2.4%
Source: Ministry of Labor, Immigration, and Population data, General Administration Department

The township is overwhelmingly rural with, in 2023, only 2.9% of the population living in the singular town of Lemyethna. According to the 2014 Myanmar census, 44.9% of the township used a bicycle for daily travel, with 33.7% using some form of animal-driven cart for daily travel. Only 5.0% of the population primarily used electricity to light their homes with only 0.1% of the population having a flush toilet and a further 78.2% of the population an enclosed sceptic tank or system.

In 2023, the township experienced depopulation, losing a little over two thousand people between 2022 and 2023. The majority religion is Buddhism with 98.0% of the population adhering to it and the majority ethnic group are Bamar people.

== Economy ==
The township is seeing a lack of economic growth when compared to others in Ayeyarwady Region. The primary industry of the township is agriculture with rice being the overwhelming crop transported out through the township's waterways and roadways to larger markets like Hinthada, Pathein and Yangon. Other notable agricultural produce of the town include rubber and mangoes as well as a variety of vegetable farming, shrimp farming, and cattle and poultry raising primarily for local consumption. With increase in demand for cassava in the late 2010s and the prevalent of rainfed upland land unsuitable for rice cultivation, pilot programs have found some success encouraging cassava cultivation in the township.

The township is home to significant copper deposits. The stratabound copper deposits in the township form Cyprus-type copper alongside gold deposits, which contribute to the township's mining industry. The township has 11 industrial granaries and 43 combine harvesters. There is also a significant forestry industry, with teak logging managed by the government. The township has a total of 2,765 acres of non-teak private-managed forests.

== See also ==
- List of villages in Lemyethna Township
