= Ngayokaung =

Ngayokaung ငရုတ်ကောင်းမြို့
- Town
- Ngayoutkaung
- Location within Myanmar
- Coordinates: 16°31′16″N 94°17′51″E
- Country: Myanmar
- Region: Ayeyarwady
- District: Pathein
- Township: Ngapudaw
- Subtownship: Ngayokaung

Area
  - Total: 1.9 km^{2} (0.73 sq mi)

Population (2014)
  - Total: 3,178
  - Density: 1,700/km^{2} (4,300/sq mi)
- Time zone: UTC6:30 (MST)

Ngayokaung (Burmese: ငရုတ်ကောင်း, lit. 'Chili pepper', also spelt Ngayoutkaung or Ngayokekaung) is a town in southwestern Ayeyarwady Region within the Ngayokaung Subtownship, Ngapudaw Township, Pathein District, Myanmar. It is a coastal town on the Bay of Bengal near Goyingyi Island. The Ngayokaung Road connects the Mawtin-Pathein road to the town across the southern end of the Arakan Mountains. It is the primary town within Ngayokaung Subtownship, Ngapudaw Township, Pathein District. The town of Ngayokaung has an area of 0.72 square miles (1.9 km^{2})

During the COVID-19 pandemic, the town implemented strict COVID inspection gates. These gates were destroyed in December 2020- allegedly by the construction company building a hotel on nearby Goyingyi Island after tensions grew as the local government required incoming construction workers to undergo a 7-day quarantine. The first COVID-19 death in the town occurred in June 2021.
