= Phaung Daw U Pagoda (Pathein) =

Buddhist Pagoda in Ayeyarwady, Myanmar

Yekyiu Pagoda
- လေးကျွန်းမာရ်အောင် ဖောင်တော်ဦးစေတီ
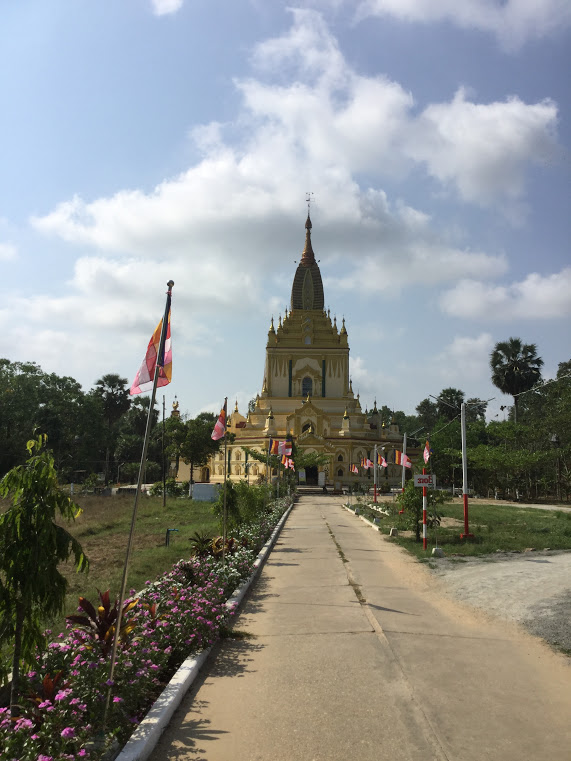

Religion
- Affiliation: Theravada Buddhism

Location
- Country: Pathein, Ayeyarwady Region, Myanmar
- Interactive map of Yekyiu Pagoda
- Coordinates: 16.751362°N 94.728075°E

Yekyiu Pagoda (Burmese: ရေကြည်ဦးဘုရား), officially known as the Lay Kyun Man Aung Phaung Daw U Pagoda (Burmese: လေးကျွန်းမာရ်အောင် ဖောင်တော်ဦးစေတီ), is a Buddhist pagoda in the southern part of Pathein, Ayeyarwady Region, Myanmar (Burma).

== See also ==
- Shwemokhtaw Pagoda
- Buddhism in Myanmar
