= Hainggyi Island (island) =

Island in southwestern Myanmar

Native name: ဟိုင်းကြီးကျွန်း
- Location within Myanmar

Geography
- Location: Indian Ocean
- Coordinates: 16°N 94.3179°E
- Adjacent to: Bay of Bengal
- Total islands: 1
- Area: 25.29 km^{2} (9.76 sq mi)

Administration
- Myanmar
- Region: Ayeyarwady
- District: Pathein
- Township: Ngapudaw
- Subtownship: Hainggyikyun

Demographics
- Languages: Burmese
- Ethnic groups: Bamar

Additional information
- Time zone: MST (UTC+6.30)

Hainggyi Island (Burmese: ဟိုင်းကြီးကျွန်း, also spelt Haigyi Island or Hainggyikyun) is an island near the southwestern tip of Ayeyarwady Region near Cape Negrais located at the mouth of the Pathein River. The island has a marine port in its west and the town of Hainggyi Island on the east. The island is divided into the village tract of Zibyugyaung and the town of Hainggyi Island, which has 2 wards. The island lies within Hainggyikyun Subtownship within Ngapudaw Township, Pathein District.

The Pammawaddy Regional Command of the Myanmar Navy is headquartered in Hainggyi Island with its main port in the western part of island, outside the town. The Khamaukmaw Bridge connects the island to the mainland on the far western end south of the port.

Cyclone Nargis made landfall on Hainggyi Island in 2008 with sustained winds of 130mph. Political unrest at the time within Myanmar severely impeded aid and relief efforts.
