= Ngayokaung Subtownship =

Subtownship in Myanmar

Ngayokaung Subtownship ငရုတ်ကောင်းမြို့နယ်ခွဲ
- Subtownship
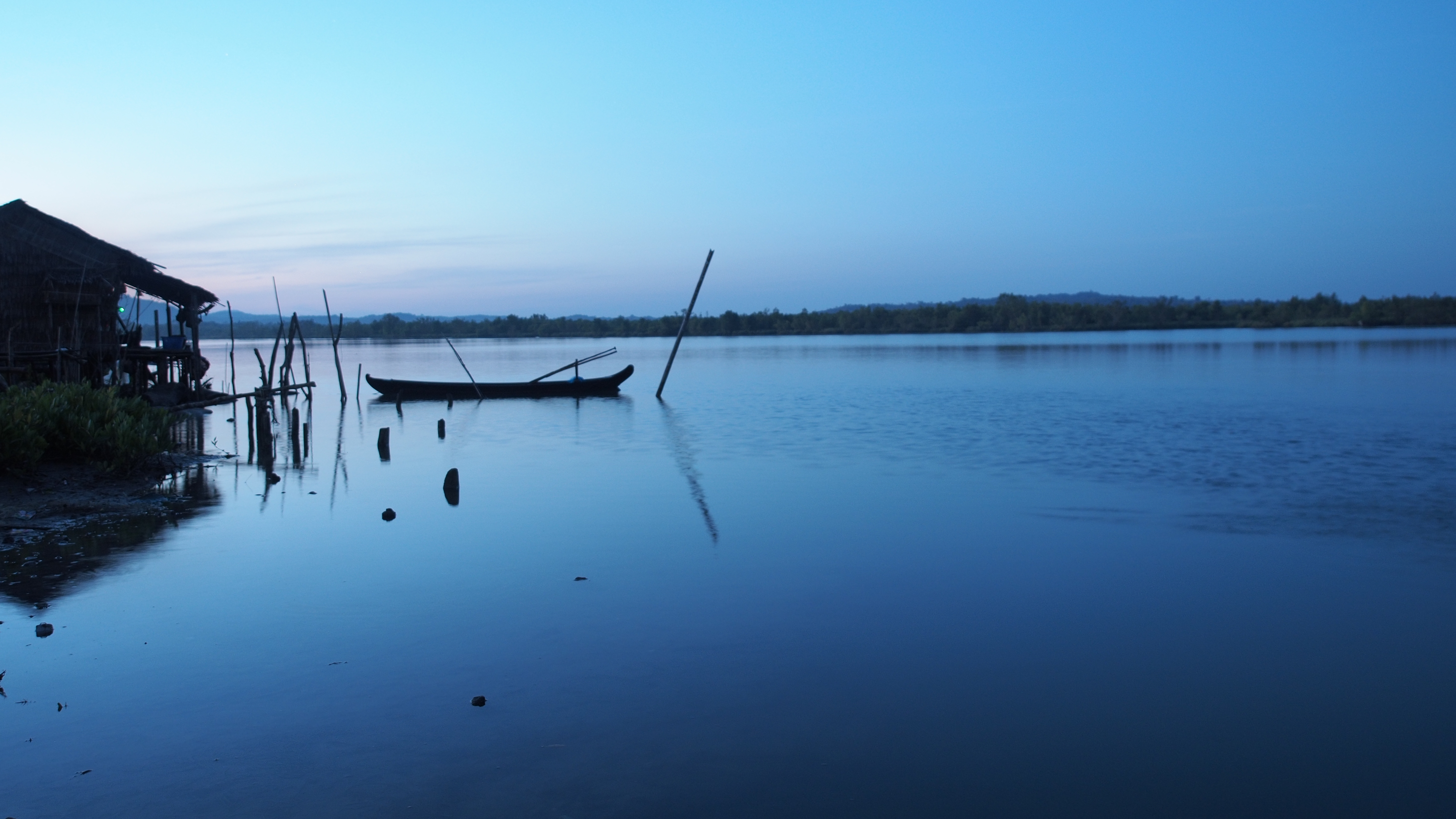
- Goyingyi Jetty, Ngayokaung town

- Location in Pathein district
- Coordinates: 16°28′N 94°21′E
- Country: Myanmar
- Region: Ayeyarwady Region
- District: Pathein District
- Township: Ngapudaw Township

Area
  - Total: 469.6 sq mi (1,216.2 km^{2})
- Highest elevation: 1,325 ft (404 m)

Population (2014)
  - Total: 41,194
  - Density: 87.726/sq mi (33.871/km^{2})
- Time zone: UTC+6:30 (MMT)

Ngayokaung Subtownship (Burmese: ငရုတ်ကောင်းမြို့နယ်ခွဲ) is a subtownship of Ngapudaw Township in Pathein District, Ayeyarwady Region, Myanmar. The namesake of the subtownship is the town of Ngayokaung, which literally translates to pepper. The subtownship is coastal, bordering the Bay of Bengal to the west. To its north, it borders Pathein Township. To its east and south, it borders the rest of Ngapudaw Township. The eastern bound of the subtownship follows the Mawtin-Pathein road. The Subtownship is mountainous with the southern portions of the Arakan Mountains within the township making the area historically difficult to reach and hard to develop. The subtownship is divided into 11 village tracts consisting of 68 villages and one town, Ngayokaung, split into 2 wards. and a population of only 3,254 people in 2014.

The median age within the township is 30 years and the mean household has 4.0 persons. There are 102 males for every 100 females within the township. The township was very underdeveloped in 2014 with only 53 residents having a computer and 46 households with kerosene stoves.

The town sought to develop Goyingyi Island near the town of Ngayokaung into a community-based tourist resort, but were denied by the Ayeyarwady Region Government based on a study conducted in 2018. Despite its name, Goyingyi Island is a peninsular cut off from the town by the wide mouth of a stream without a bridge.
