= Diamond Island (Myanmar) =

Island off Myanmar

Diamond Island, now Thamihla Kyun (Burmese: သမီးလှကျွန်း; lit. 'Beautiful Daughter Island'), is off the coast of Burma at 15°51′30″N 94°17′30″E. It is in the Ayeyarwady Region and off Cape Negrais, which is also known as Pagoda Point or Mawdin Zoon, and marks the entrance to the Bassein River.

The island is the site of an active navigational light on a skeletal tower.

The island is a nesting place for green and loggerhead turtles. It is now one of the major nesting areas for green turtles in Myanmar, and since 1986 there has been a conservation station on the island. In recent years the loss of mangroves has reduced turtle nesting sites. Cyclone Nargis, 2–3 May 2008, also damaged turtle nests and nesting sites. The Department of Fisheries protects the island and has established hatcheries to preserve the turtles' habitat.

== History ==
In 1801 the British merchant ship Mermaid wrecked on a rock some miles from the island. On 7 November 1808 the East Indiaman Travers did so also.

A communications station, now closed, was established there. The station in 1908 was in radio contact with the Andaman Islands and had a telegraph connection to Bassein (now Pathein).

During World War II, in January 1942 the river steamer Yengyua evacuated the British radio operators on the island. On 6 March 1943, B-24s strafed the radio station while returning from an attack on shipping at Pagoda Point.
