= Pathein Cultural Museum =

- ပုသိမ်ယဉ်ကျေးမှုပြတိုက်
- Former name: Bogyoke Aung San Library
- Established: 1960; 66 years ago
- Location: Pathein, Ayeyarwady Division, Myanmar
- Coordinates: 16°47′01″N 94°43′55″E
- Type: Cultural Museum
- Accreditation: Ministry of Religious Affairs and Culture (Myanmar)

The Pathein Cultural Museum is a museum in Pathein, Ayeyarwady Region, Myanmar. The museum began as the Bogyoke Aung San Library in 1960. In 1963, it was handed over to the government, and became the Irrawaddy Division Museum and Library. The new museum was opened in December 1990, and displays Pathein bamboo umbrellas, Buddha images, paintings, bronze drums, weapons, lacquer-wares and clay pipes, folk arts materials, and bronze weights used in the 19th century.

Pathein's principal industry of Pathein hti umbrella-making is represented in the Pathein Cultural Museum as a noteworthy intangible cultural heritage of the region.

The admission fee is 2 US $ and the opening hours are from 10:00 am to 3:30 pm (from Tuesday to Sunday) except on public holidays.
