= SS Yengyua (1914 ship) =

History

United Kingdom
- Name: Yengyua
- Operator: 1914:British India Steam Navigation Company; 1951:Arakan River Flotilla; 1953:Government of Burma
- Launched: 1914
- Fate: Sold to Burmese government in 1953

General characteristics
- Tonnage: 238 GRT
- Length: Overall:141 ft (43.0 m); Between posts:136 ft (41.5 m)
- Beam: 23 ft (7.0 m)
- Depth: 8 ft (2.4 m)

Yengyua was launched in 1914 for the British-India Steam Navigation Company (BISN). She was a shallow draft steamer, stationed primarily at Tavoy, Burma, transporting passengers and cargo between Tavoy and Grindstone Island (13°39′30″N 98°11′30″E; now Kathema Kyun) to connect with the ships trading between Rangoon and Penang. During World War II she evacuated British personnel from Lower Burma and then was the headquarters for a small flotilla that attacked the Japanese on the Mayu River. In 1951 she was sold to the Arakan Flotilla Co., which in 1953 sold her to Government of Burma.

== World War II service ==
In 1942 Yengyua was the first BISN vessel to evacuate refugees. On 15 January Japanese crossed from Thailand and seized a hill some three miles from Tavoy. In the morning of 18 January Captain R. Burch embarked 22 persons on Yengyua, including five Europeans, and sailed to Grindstone Island. Before he could sail 150 miles south to Mergui to pick up reinforcements to bring them back to Tavoy he found out that the Japanese had entered Tavoy. He therefore sailed for Rangoon instead, arriving there two days later. Next, Yengyua evacuated the British radio operators on Diamond Island. Then she sailed to Akyab, from where she made several voyages to Calcutta with refugees.

In 1943 the British were retreating up the Arakan peninsula. In order to impede them, the Royal Navy gave Captain Robert Franks the task of preventing Japanese forces from crossing the Mayu River and blocking the British Army's retreat. Using a commandeered Yengyua as his headquarters, he took six small craft from Chittagong to a port on the coast. On a moonless night his force drifted upstream until within 80 yards of several large, camouflaged Japanese vessels. He was able to take the convoy by surprise and destroy them. He also took what he believed were the first Japanese prisoners on this front. On 7 March Franks started moving his force upriver, hiding in jungle-covered inlets by day and patrolling by night. The little force engaged in several night-time battles and was able to block the Japanese from using the river. By mid-May, however, Franks could no longer operate, being subject to both deliberate fire by the Japanese artillery and air force and inadvertent attack by the Royal Air Force. Franks laid his craft up at Taung Bazar. He then led his 20 men, with mules helping them carry their weapons, ammunition, and kit, across the mountains to the coast.
