= Pathein hti =

Traditional Burmese umbrella

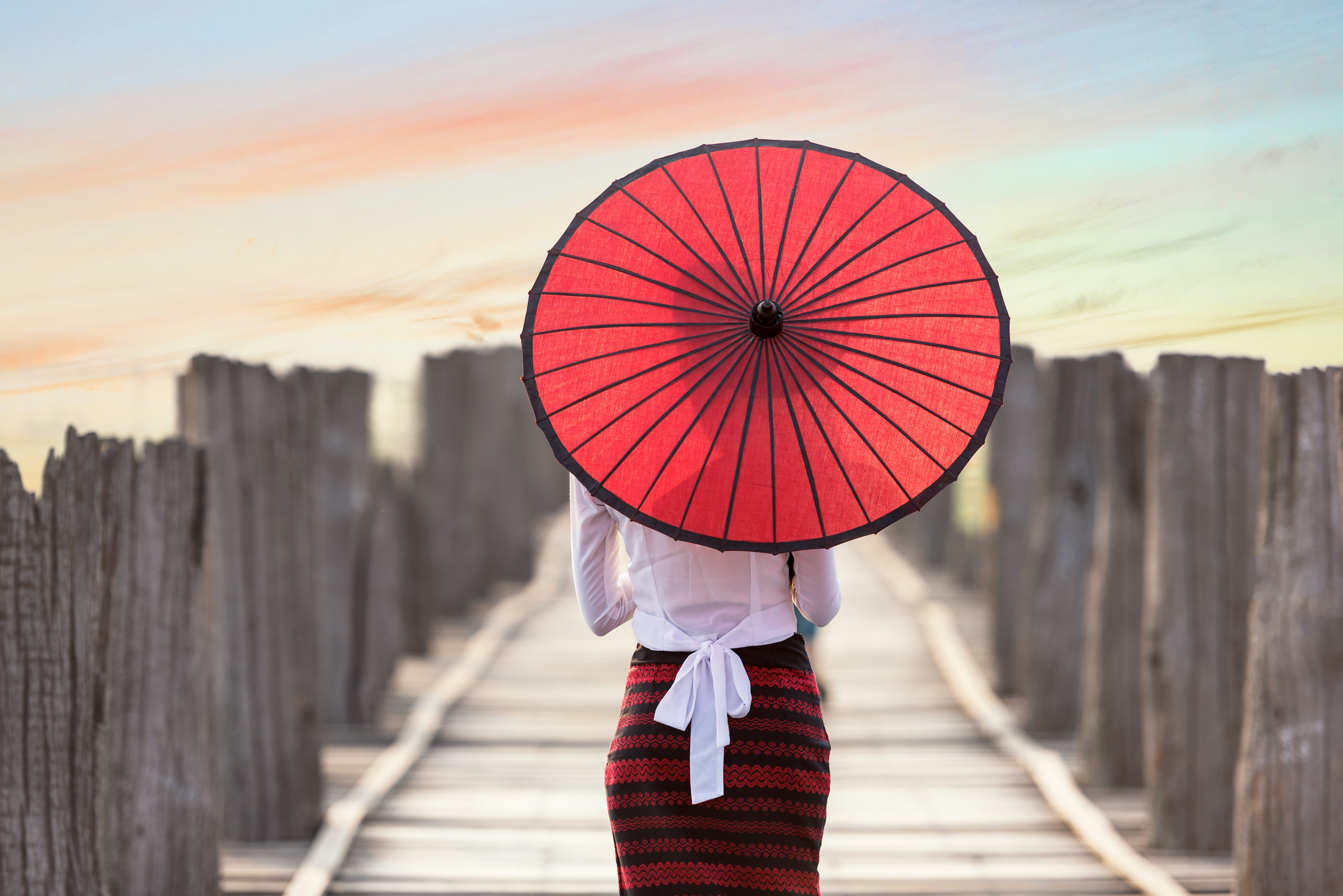
A woman holds a Pathein hti

Pathein hti, (Burmese: ပုသိမ်ထီး pronounced [Pa-thaein-hti]; literally: Pathein umbrella), is a Myanmar traditional umbrella, or hti, from Pathein, the capital city of Ayeyarwady Region of Myanmar crafted from paper, cotton and bamboo. Over 130 years ago, they were mainly used for sun and rain protection. Nowadays, these umbrellas have become essential decorating tools in traditional festivals and ceremonies and are also among the famous souvenir items to be picked up by foreign visitors.

The production of Pathein hti is one of the most iconic aspects of Pathein's traditional culture.

== Origin and history ==
Pathein hti umbrellas were first used over 130 years ago, invented by a royal handicraft maker called U Shwe Sar (Burmese: ဦးရွှေစာ) during the era of Thibaw Min in the late 19th century. Throughout the feudal era from the Bagan to Konbaung periods, only royal families and monks traditionally had the right to use umbrellas, which were seen as a symbol of reverence that signified power and authority, and embodied a sense of nobility. The ancient tradition of Myanmar umbrellas ended with the fall of the Myanmar monarchy, when Thibaw Min was exiled in 1885 following the Third Anglo-Burmese War. Royal craftsmen left the palace and in 1914, U Shwe Sar and his companions moved to Pathein and started crafting the Pathein hti. Though it was created by U Shwe Sar prior to his move, it was called as the Pathein umbrella after the region where it was produced.

== Production process ==
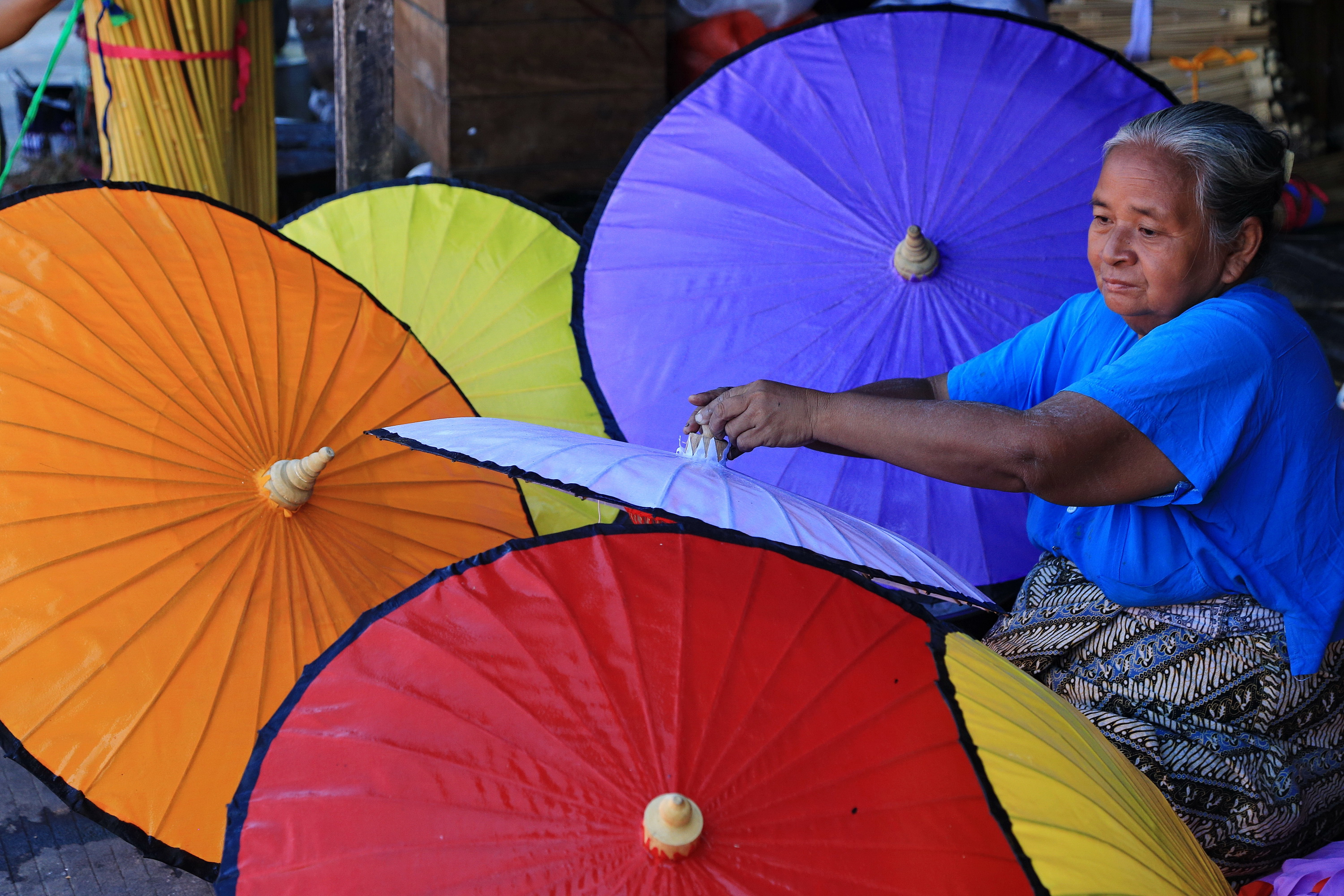
A woman in a Pathein hti shop

The main raw materials used in making Pathein umbrellas are wood and bamboo. Traditionally, there is a list of forty steps that an umbrella-maker is supposed to undertake in the forest- meaning various steps with the various woods needed for the umbrella. The supporting and branch arms are made from locally grown Taragu bamboo (Burmese: သရကူဝါး) that are at least nine years old as younger bamboo has a tendency for insect infestation. The main shaft and handle are made with Ma U Shwe War wood (Burmese: မအူရွှေဝါ) from the Ma U tree. The canopy was initially made with oil paper and is nowadays made with oil-soaked cloth like silk, and cotton for longer-lasting use.

The Pathein umbrella is a true Myanmar handicraft, crafted entirely by hand from beginning to end without any machinery. Creating a Pathein umbrella involves numerous stages, starting from frame assembly, binding process, dyeing process, decoration, and polishing, to final quality checks. Every step is precisely completed by hand, following the traditional palace umbrella-making techniques from around a century ago.

After selecting the raw materials for each part of the umbrella, the selected bamboo has to be carefully split and crafted to produce strong and flexible ribs. Then, the wooden central shaft and bamboo ribs are assembled by skilled craftsmen to form the sturdy umbrella's framework. In the stage of binding, the cotton canopy fabric is bound to the bamboo ribs, and the fabric is adjusted to make sure it is evenly spread and securely fixed to the frame. A small bamboo ring wrapped with colored wool is also attached near the grip to keep the umbrella tightly closed. Glue is often used in modern construction to secure the fabric to the bamboo ribs.

The cotton canopy is traditionally dyed with Tasae (တစေး), a natural dye extracted from fruits. It is repeatedly applied to create rich and long-lasting color. Once the canopy is dyed and dried, the fabric has to be coated with oil to enhance durability and create a waterproof finish. The most artistic part of the production process reflecting the royal artistic tradition is the detailed hand-paintings and decorations, including intricate floral designs and patterns. There are various designs nowadays, ranging from saffron-coloured umbrellas for monks and more colourful "beauty umbrellas".

Lastly, the final quality check is done, inspecting each part of the umbrella to ensure quality and making any final adjustments are needed for durability and appearance. This process balances traditional handcrafting techniques with steps that ensure high-quality and visually appealing umbrellas, capturing the essence of Pathein's umbrella-making heritage.

== In Society ==
Mostly, it is used for Myanmar festivals such as the Ka-htain festival, Thingyan water festival and other Buddhist religious ceremonies. It is also especially a part of local Shinbyu novitiation ceremonies, in particular during the U Shwe Yoe and Daw Moe dance, which is performed in celebration of these ceremonies. These festivals and events showcase the Pathein umbrella as more than a practical item, it is also a symbol of Myanmar's cultural pride, artistry, and tradition. In addition, it is also a well-known souvenir of Myanmar for foreign visitors and is top of the mind for local Burmese travellers looking to bring gifts to take home after visiting Pathein.

However, in recent times, small business using the traditional methods have faced economic hardship due to decreases in demand, scarcity of raw materials and a lack of workers how can acquire the necessary skills. These trends have worsened since 2011 and the country's economic growth in the early 2010s.

The principal industry of umbrella-making is represented in the Pathein Cultural Museum as a noteworthy intangible cultural heritage of the region.
