= List of villages in Ngapudaw Township =

This is a list of villages in Ngapudaw Township, Pathein District, Ayeyarwady Region, Burma (Myanmar).

Village	Village code	Village tract	Coordinates (links to map & photo sources)	Notes
Chauk Te Su	153961	Kan Su		
Ta Loke Kwin	153960	Kan Su	16.6076°N 94.7313°E	
Boe Hin Chaung	153959	Kan Su	16.606°N 94.739°E	
Ohn Pin Su	153958	Kan Su	16.5933°N 94.7651°E	
Kan Su	153957	Kan Su	16.6138°N 94.7447°E	
Kyaung Su	216707	Kan Su		
Sin Oe Bo	160599	Sin Oe Bo	16.5284°N 94.6836°E	
Peik Tar	160600	Sin Oe Bo	16.5084°N 94.6913°E	
Kan Kwin	160601	Sin Oe Bo	16.5113°N 94.6971°E	
Kyaung Htauk Kone	160602	Sin Oe Bo		
Thet Kei Chaung	162419	Thet Kei Chaung	16.6263°N 94.7421°E	
Ta Khun Taing	163185	Wet Su	16.5868°N 94.7263°E	
Wet Su	163184	Wet Su	16.5746°N 94.6996°E	
Hpyan Yae Kyaw	152532	Hpyan Yae Kyaw	16.6224°N 94.7115°E	
Kyun Chaung	156691	Leik Chaung		
Dei Kone	156688	Leik Chaung	16.5457°N 94.7094°E	
Leik Chaung	156686	Leik Chaung	16.5462°N 94.7211°E	
U Yin Kone	156687	Leik Chaung	16.5424°N 94.7039°E	
Chan Kwin	156689	Leik Chaung	16.5236°N 94.7165°E	
Pa Ma Wa Di	156690	Leik Chaung		
Kat Tar Yar Wa	158796	Ok Pon Yae Kyaw		
Kan Seik	158797	Ok Pon Yae Kyaw	16.5603°N 94.6891°E	
Oke Pon Ah Wa	158800	Ok Pon Yae Kyaw		
Kan Gyi Su	158799	Ok Pon Yae Kyaw		
Oke Pon Auk Su	158795	Ok Pon Yae Kyaw		
Yae Kyaw	158798	Ok Pon Yae Kyaw	16.5793°N 94.6751°E	
Ah Wa Beik	150359	Ah Wa Beik	16.2769°N 94.5623°E	
Koke Ko	150360	Ah Wa Beik	16.3078°N 94.58°E	
Ku La Ma Taung	150361	Ah Wa Beik	16.3229°N 94.5494°E	
Ma Yang Chaung	150362	Ah Wa Beik	16.2968°N 94.5598°E	
Myat Hpu Chaung	150363	Ah Wa Beik	16.2936°N 94.5486°E	
Thea Hpyu	150364	Ah Wa Beik	16.2894°N 94.5641°E	
Wea Daunt	150365	Ah Wa Beik	16.2894°N 94.5751°E	
Thar Yar Kone	216710	Ah Wa Beik	16.2897°N 94.5528°E	
Khaing Mye Taung	216711	Ah Wa Beik		
Du Seik	216712	Ah Wa Beik		
Ma Mya Seik	216709	Ah Wa Beik	16.302°N 94.5344°E	
Aye Yangon	216708	Ah Wa Beik	16.3064°N 94.5459°E	
Hin Oe Chaung	151919	Hin Oe Chaung	16.621°N 94.6349°E	
Tha Yet Chaung	151921	Hin Oe Chaung	16.6079°N 94.6368°E	
Yae Ngan	151920	Hin Oe Chaung	16.6113°N 94.6391°E	
Ahr Kar	150399	Ahr Kar	16.2647°N 94.4291°E	
Kyauk Gyi	150400	Ahr Kar	16.2713°N 94.4243°E	
Pyin Ka Doe	150401	Ahr Kar	16.2506°N 94.4538°E	
Taung Leik Chaung	150402	Ahr Kar	16.2731°N 94.4543°E	
Pyaung Pyan	150403	Ahr Kar	16.2911°N 94.4675°E	
War Taw Gyi	150404	Ahr Kar	16.293°N 94.4459°E	
Htan Kone Ywar Thit	150405	Ahr Kar	16.313°N 94.4611°E	
Hle Seik	150406	Ahr Kar	16.2676°N 94.4152°E	
Tha Yet Pin Kwin	160529	Sin Ku Gyi	16.2457°N 94.5146°E	
Kha Naw Kha Ni (Kyun Ka Lay)	160532	Sin Ku Gyi	16.2829°N 94.5106°E	
Tha Bawt Kone	160533	Sin Ku Gyi	16.2682°N 94.4841°E	
Sin Ku Gyi	160528	Sin Ku Gyi	16.2558°N 94.4971°E	
San Ka Lay	160530	Sin Ku Gyi	16.2663°N 94.4814°E	
Ma Gyi Kone	160534	Sin Ku Gyi	16.2412°N 94.4889°E	
Ma Yan Kone	160531	Sin Ku Gyi	16.2692°N 94.5096°E	
Gon Nyin Tan	151735	Gon Nyin Tan	16.5881°N 94.6221°E	
Aye Kone	151737	Gon Nyin Tan		
Tha Yet Taw	151738	Gon Nyin Tan	16.5705°N 94.6018°E	
Lay Laung	151736	Gon Nyin Tan	16.5855°N 94.5998°E	
Bwet Gyi	155282	Kyat Sin Chaung	16.489°N 94.611°E	
Kyat Sin Chaung	155276	Kyat Sin Chaung		
Ka Nyin Kwin	155279	Kyat Sin Chaung	16.4783°N 94.6063°E	
Ae Moe Lu	155280	Kyat Sin Chaung		
Thet Hpo Lu	155281	Kyat Sin Chaung		
Ah Yoe Dar	155277	Kyat Sin Chaung	16.4899°N 94.6428°E	
Zee Kone	155278	Kyat Sin Chaung		
Htee Mu Pa Law	216714	Kyat Sin Chaung		
Ka Mar Lu	216713	Kyat Sin Chaung		
Ka Tet Chaung	158316	Nga Yant Chaung Taung Chaung	16.5676°N 94.6059°E	
Kyauk Yae Twin	158317	Nga Yant Chaung Taung Chaung		
Pyaw Kone	158313	Nga Yant Chaung Taung Chaung	16.5658°N 94.5997°E	
Taung Chaung	158314	Nga Yant Chaung Taung Chaung	16.5412°N 94.6079°E	
Taung Ka Lay	158312	Nga Yant Chaung Taung Chaung	16.569°N 94.6124°E	
Ta Zin Kwin	158315	Nga Yant Chaung Taung Chaung	16.5205°N 94.5995°E	
Hlaing Bone	155350	Kyauk Tan	16.4695°N 94.6607°E	
Gway Pin Kwin	155351	Kyauk Tan	16.5107°N 94.6279°E	
Kyauk Tan	155348	Kyauk Tan	16.5014°N 94.6685°E	
Yae Twin Kone	155349	Kyauk Tan		
Kwin Chaung	154286	Kha Yin War Chaung	16.3874°N 94.5491°E	
Hmaw Bi	154292	Kha Yin War Chaung	16.3166°N 94.5159°E	
Su Peik	154293	Kha Yin War Chaung		
Baw Hpaw	154290	Kha Yin War Chaung	16.3181°N 94.4791°E	
San Ka Lay	154289	Kha Yin War Chaung	16.4338°N 94.568°E	
Thone Gwa	154288	Kha Yin War Chaung		
Bi Lu Chaung	154287	Kha Yin War Chaung	16.3734°N 94.5061°E	
Myin Ta lin	154291	Kha Yin War Chaung	16.3105°N 94.5072°E	
Kyet Chay Chaung	154294	Kha Yin War Chaung	16.3541°N 94.4774°E	
Thea Chaung	154285	Kha Yin War Chaung	16.3367°N 94.5215°E	
Kha Yin War Chaung	154284	Kha Yin War Chaung	16.3641°N 94.5233°E	
Gyan Kat	216715	Kha Yin War Chaung	16.3094°N 94.4982°E	
Seik Gyi	163279	Yae Kyaw Gyi	16.3353°N 94.5966°E	
Aung Ba	163280	Yae Kyaw Gyi	16.3474°N 94.6041°E	
Nga Dan Ta Yar	216716	Yae Kyaw Gyi		
Man Ka Lat	216717	Yae Kyaw Gyi		
Da Yei Chaung	163281	Yae Kyaw Gyi	16.3664°N 94.6121°E	
Yae Kyaw Gyi	163277	Yae Kyaw Gyi	16.3406°N 94.6003°E	
Kyein Chaung	163278	Yae Kyaw Gyi	16.3681°N 94.5761°E	
Nga Yaung Chaung	163282	Yae Kyaw Gyi	16.3625°N 94.5964°E	
Tha Man Day Wa	161623	Tha Man Day Wa	16.4373°N 94.6778°E	
Ah Lel Kone	161624	Tha Man Day Wa	16.4504°N 94.645°E	
Kun Chan Kone	161625	Tha Man Day Wa	16.4496°N 94.6646°E	
San Chaung Sin Oe Bo	159810	San Chaung Sin Oe Bo	16.5777°N 94.6379°E	
Myet To Wea Gyi	159811	San Chaung Sin Oe Bo	16.5993°N 94.6751°E	
Man Sa Moke Kone	159812	San Chaung Sin Oe Bo	16.5763°N 94.6321°E	
Kyauk Pon	155332	Kyauk Pon	16.3402°N 94.6547°E	
Gan Chaung	155334	Kyauk Pon	16.3106°N 94.6422°E	
Ywar Thit	155333	Kyauk Pon	16.3713°N 94.6657°E	
Taung U	216718	Kyauk Pon		
Bi Lu Kone	158853	Oke Shit Kwin	16.5464°N 94.6431°E	
Oke Shit Kwin	158852	Oke Shit Kwin	16.5236°N 94.6447°E	
Yone Chaung	158859	Oke Shit Kwin	16.5343°N 94.6121°E	
Set Kone	158855	Oke Shit Kwin	16.5299°N 94.6476°E	
Kan Gyi Kwin	158857	Oke Shit Kwin	16.518°N 94.6417°E	
Rakhine Kone	158854	Oke Shit Kwin		
Oke Shit Ka Lay	158858	Oke Shit Kwin	16.5373°N 94.6327°E	
Bay Tha La	158856	Oke Shit Kwin	16.5443°N 94.6271°E	
Nar Nat Kone	159425	Poe Laung	16.3334°N 94.4279°E	
Poe Laung	159424	Poe Laung	16.3102°N 94.422°E	
Koke Ko	216720	Poe Laung	16.3179°N 94.423°E	
U Toe	216721	Poe Laung	16.3118°N 94.4445°E	
Ku La Ma Taung	216719	Poe Laung	16.3172°N 94.4459°E	
Mei Thi Hla Kwet Thit	161200	Taung Ka Lay	16.408°N 94.6269°E	
Son Chaung	161201	Taung Ka Lay	16.4063°N 94.6021°E	
Taung Ka Lay	161198	Taung Ka Lay	16.4009°N 94.6472°E	
Hpoe Thar Seik Kone	216723	Taung Ka Lay		
Htan Thone Pin Kwet Thit	216722	Taung Ka Lay		
Mei Thi Hla	161199	Taung Ka Lay	16.4056°N 94.6282°E	
Thin Gan Chaung	154511	Kone Ka Lay	16.3787°N 94.6467°E	
Na Gar Chaung	154512	Kone Ka Lay	16.3632°N 94.635°E	
Oke Hpo	154510	Kone Ka Lay	16.354°N 94.6501°E	
Ywar Thit Ka Lay	154509	Kone Ka Lay	16.3429°N 94.6474°E	
Kone Ka Lay	154508	Kone Ka Lay	16.3486°N 94.6471°E	
Tha Pyay Kone	158873	Oke Thin Baw	16.422°N 94.6266°E	
Oke Thin Baw	158870	Oke Thin Baw	16.4288°N 94.632°E	
Kyet Ma Kone	158874	Oke Thin Baw	16.4403°N 94.6261°E	
Kyet Paung Kone	158871	Oke Thin Baw	16.4377°N 94.6221°E	
Kyar Pyan Kone	158872	Oke Thin Baw	16.4293°N 94.6221°E	
Ta Man Chaung	160968	Ta Man Chaung	16.6262°N 94.6601°E	
Ywar Ka Lay	160969	Ta Man Chaung	16.6023°N 94.6811°E	
Rakhine Kone	153937	Kan Ni	16.6173°N 94.6581°E	
Kan Ni	153936	Kan Ni	16.6248°N 94.6408°E	
Ku Lar Chaung	154571	Ku Lar Chaung	16.2454°N 94.5741°E	
Thar Kyaw Kwin	154803	Kwin Chaung	16.611°N 94.574°E	
Pu Zun Chaung	154805	Kwin Chaung	16.6229°N 94.6165°E	
Kan Bar Ni	154799	Kwin Chaung	16.6233°N 94.5841°E	
Se Ein Su	154801	Kwin Chaung	16.6285°N 94.5781°E	
Chin Kone	154802	Kwin Chaung	16.6283°N 94.5961°E	
Aye Kone	154806	Kwin Chaung	16.6192°N 94.6142°E	
Kwin Chaung	154798	Kwin Chaung	16.6226°N 94.6057°E	
Kan Bar Lay	154807	Kwin Chaung		
Sa Yar Lay Su (Boe Yon Kone)	154800	Kwin Chaung		
Kyaung Kone	154804	Kwin Chaung		
Ywar Thit	154020	Kant Ba Lar (Htein Tan)	16.2667°N 94.5182°E	
Kant Ba Lar	154017	Kant Ba Lar (Htein Tan)	16.2325°N 94.5471°E	
Yae Kyo Kone	154021	Kant Ba Lar (Htein Tan)	16.2645°N 94.5342°E	
Hin Oe Chaung	154019	Kant Ba Lar (Htein Tan)	16.2704°N 94.5282°E	
Tha Yaw Kone	154018	Kant Ba Lar (Htein Tan)		
Htein Tan	154022	Kant Ba Lar (Htein Tan)	16.2267°N 94.5242°E	
Pyin Taung	160426	Shwe Taung	16.4669°N 94.6453°E	
Kyauk Ta Lone	160427	Shwe Taung	16.4804°N 94.6481°E	
Shwe Taung	160425	Shwe Taung	16.4733°N 94.6269°E	
Kant Ba Lar	154028	Kant Ba Lar Kyun Nyo	16.2485°N 94.6085°E	
Thar Khway Chaung	154032	Kant Ba Lar Kyun Nyo	16.2794°N 94.6131°E	
Hpa Yar (South)	154031	Kant Ba Lar Kyun Nyo	16.2584°N 94.6161°E	
Boe Shwe Hlaw	154029	Kant Ba Lar Kyun Nyo	16.2928°N 94.6398°E	
Za Yat Chaung	154033	Kant Ba Lar Kyun Nyo	16.2912°N 94.6146°E	
Boe Kyar Aing	154030	Kant Ba Lar Kyun Nyo		
Thaik Kwin	161293	Taw Gyi	16.4254°N 94.5921°E	
Boe Shwe Lay	161292	Taw Gyi	16.4384°N 94.5931°E	
Taw Gyi (East)	161291	Taw Gyi	16.459°N 94.5811°E	
Kyar Kwin	155221	Kyar Kwin	16.4216°N 94.6737°E	
Kan	155222	Kyar Kwin	16.4203°N 94.6551°E	
Thaw Ka Kwin	155225	Kyar Kwin	16.4231°N 94.6667°E	
Yae Twin Kone	155223	Kyar Kwin	16.4174°N 94.6611°E	
Kan Thone Se	155224	Kyar Kwin	16.4151°N 94.6717°E	
Eik Sa Pon	155226	Kyar Kwin		
Htee Lone Hpyu	162790	Tin Chaung (Ngayokekaung Sub-township)	16.3688°N 94.4374°E	
Ma Yan Kone	162789	Tin Chaung (Ngayokekaung Sub-township)	16.3766°N 94.4422°E	
Ywar Thit	162792	Tin Chaung (Ngayokekaung Sub-township)	16.3458°N 94.4235°E	
Tin Chaung	162786	Tin Chaung (Ngayokekaung Sub-township)	16.3859°N 94.4437°E	
Ngayokekaung (South)	162788	Tin Chaung (Ngayokekaung Sub-township)	16.403°N 94.4511°E	
Tha Yet Kone	162791	Tin Chaung (Ngayokekaung Sub-township)	16.3799°N 94.4414°E	
Ka Nyin Chaung	162793	Tin Chaung (Ngayokekaung Sub-township)		
Yoe Kwin	162794	Tin Chaung (Ngayokekaung Sub-township)	16.3668°N 94.4505°E	
Pein Hne Chaung	162795	Tin Chaung (Ngayokekaung Sub-township)	16.3513°N 94.433°E	
Ngayokekaung Taung Ywar Thit	162796	Tin Chaung (Ngayokekaung Sub-township)	16.4095°N 94.4504°E	
Wet Ka Lay	162797	Tin Chaung (Ngayokekaung Sub-township)	16.3905°N 94.4563°E	
Wet Kaw	162787	Tin Chaung (Ngayokekaung Sub-township)	16.378°N 94.4473°E	
Nan Thar Pu	158050	Nan Thar Pu (Ngayokekaung Sub-township)	16.5326°N 94.2618°E	
Kyauk Hpyar	158052	Nan Thar Pu (Ngayokekaung Sub-township)	16.5376°N 94.2685°E	
Ah Lel Kone	158051	Nan Thar Pu (Ngayokekaung Sub-township)	16.5343°N 94.2728°E	
Kwin Pu	158063	Nat Hmaw (Ngayokekaung Sub-township)	16.4647°N 94.2695°E	
Kyauk Chaung Lay	158064	Nat Hmaw (Ngayokekaung Sub-township)	16.4426°N 94.2656°E	
Kan Chay U	158065	Nat Hmaw (Ngayokekaung Sub-township)	16.4648°N 94.2655°E	
Yaung Chi U	158066	Nat Hmaw (Ngayokekaung Sub-township)	16.4629°N 94.2682°E	
Tha Pyay Kone	158067	Nat Hmaw (Ngayokekaung Sub-township)	16.4553°N 94.2696°E	
Nat Hmaw	158062	Nat Hmaw (Ngayokekaung Sub-township)	16.4574°N 94.2713°E	
Gon Nyin Tan	162692	Thit Yaung (Ngayokekaung Sub-township)	16.6098°N 94.362°E	
Taung Tha Yet Kone	162690	Thit Yaung (Ngayokekaung Sub-township)	16.6291°N 94.3673°E	
Than Pat Kwin	162688	Thit Yaung (Ngayokekaung Sub-township)	16.6245°N 94.3808°E	
Kun Thee Taw	162689	Thit Yaung (Ngayokekaung Sub-township)	16.5944°N 94.3485°E	
Mi Chaung Khaung	162691	Thit Yaung (Ngayokekaung Sub-township)	16.603°N 94.3248°E	
Thit Yaung	162687	Thit Yaung (Ngayokekaung Sub-township)	16.6187°N 94.3545°E	
Ywar Thit Kone	162693	Thit Yaung (Ngayokekaung Sub-township)	16.6336°N 94.3719°E	
San Chaung	163271	Yae Kyaw (Ngayokekaung Sub-township)	16.5002°N 94.3222°E	
Ka Nyin Chaung	163273	Yae Kyaw (Ngayokekaung Sub-township)		
Tha Le Doe	163270	Yae Kyaw (Ngayokekaung Sub-township)	16.5055°N 94.3276°E	
Thin Ngan	163272	Yae Kyaw (Ngayokekaung Sub-township)	16.524°N 94.3321°E	
Yae Kyaw	163269	Yae Kyaw (Ngayokekaung Sub-township)	16.5264°N 94.3229°E	
Ywar Thit Kone	163274	Yae Kyaw (Ngayokekaung Sub-township)	16.5256°N 94.3293°E	
Ngan Chaung	159055	Pan Hmaw (Ngayokekaung Sub-township)	16.3581°N 94.2432°E	
Taung Pat Lel	159056	Pan Hmaw (Ngayokekaung Sub-township)		
Pan Hmaw	159054	Pan Hmaw (Ngayokekaung Sub-township)	16.3733°N 94.2454°E	
Yae Twin Kone	159057	Pan Hmaw (Ngayokekaung Sub-township)	16.3561°N 94.2476°E	
Na Be Kone	159768	Sa Par Gyi (Ngayokekaung Sub-township)	16.4186°N 94.2697°E	
Sa Par Gyi	159763	Sa Par Gyi (Ngayokekaung Sub-township)	16.396°N 94.2517°E	
Boke Pin Seik	159764	Sa Par Gyi (Ngayokekaung Sub-township)	16.4138°N 94.2554°E	
Than Man Kone	159765	Sa Par Gyi (Ngayokekaung Sub-township)	16.3951°N 94.2581°E	
Hnget Pyaw Chaung	159766	Sa Par Gyi (Ngayokekaung Sub-township)	16.4315°N 94.2587°E	
Pa De Kaw	159767	Sa Par Gyi (Ngayokekaung Sub-township)	16.4257°N 94.2668°E	
Thea Hpyu Kone	154786	Kwin Bet (Ngayokekaung Sub-township)	16.3523°N 94.2329°E	
Kwin Bet	154781	Kwin Bet (Ngayokekaung Sub-township)	16.3433°N 94.2347°E	
Kwin Waing	154782	Kwin Bet (Ngayokekaung Sub-township)	16.3246°N 94.2291°E	
Thea Chaung	154783	Kwin Bet (Ngayokekaung Sub-township)	16.2908°N 94.2376°E	
Than Ban	154784	Kwin Bet (Ngayokekaung Sub-township)	16.2584°N 94.2331°E	
Ywar Thit Kone	154785	Kwin Bet (Ngayokekaung Sub-township)		
Thea Kone	156323	Kyway Chaing (Ngayokekaung Sub-township)	16.5065°N 94.2713°E	
Ah Neint Chaung	156324	Kyway Chaing (Ngayokekaung Sub-township)	16.5196°N 94.2699°E	
Kyway Chaing	156322	Kyway Chaing (Ngayokekaung Sub-township)	16.5132°N 94.2704°E	
Sar Chet	216724	Thea Hpyu (Ngayokekaung Sub-township)	16.7099°N 94.3575°E	
Auk Chaung Hpyar	162282	Thea Hpyu (Ngayokekaung Sub-township)	16.6643°N 94.3831°E	
Chaung Hpyar	162281	Thea Hpyu (Ngayokekaung Sub-township)		
Lel Di	162280	Thea Hpyu (Ngayokekaung Sub-township)	16.6734°N 94.372°E	
Ka Na So Kone	162279	Thea Hpyu (Ngayokekaung Sub-township)	16.6498°N 94.3628°E	
Thea Hpyu	162277	Thea Hpyu (Ngayokekaung Sub-township)	16.6763°N 94.3669°E	
Oke Hpo	162278	Thea Hpyu (Ngayokekaung Sub-township)	16.6694°N 94.3777°E	
Pi Tauk Kone	157748	Moe Tein Pyin (Ngayokekaung Sub-township)	16.5807°N 94.3499°E	
Moe Tein Pyin	157742	Moe Tein Pyin (Ngayokekaung Sub-township)	16.5437°N 94.3317°E	
Thet Kei Pyin Kwin	157743	Moe Tein Pyin (Ngayokekaung Sub-township)	16.5365°N 94.3294°E	
Me Za Li Kone	157744	Moe Tein Pyin (Ngayokekaung Sub-township)	16.5341°N 94.3433°E	
Ah Lel	157751	Moe Tein Pyin (Ngayokekaung Sub-township)	16.5757°N 94.3498°E	
Sin Hmon	157745	Moe Tein Pyin (Ngayokekaung Sub-township)	16.5242°N 94.3425°E	
Hpa Yar Chaung	157749	Moe Tein Pyin (Ngayokekaung Sub-township)	16.5865°N 94.3495°E	
Kyauk Khe Gyi	157747	Moe Tein Pyin (Ngayokekaung Sub-township)	16.5563°N 94.3436°E	
Ywar Thit	157746	Moe Tein Pyin (Ngayokekaung Sub-township)	16.5502°N 94.3423°E	
Taung Pat Lel	157750	Moe Tein Pyin (Ngayokekaung Sub-township)	16.5897°N 94.3485°E	
