= Pathein River =

River in Ayeyarwady Region, Myanmar

Coordinates: 17.91086°N 95.45863°E

Pathein River ပုသိမ်မြစ် Ngawun River ငဝန်မြစ်
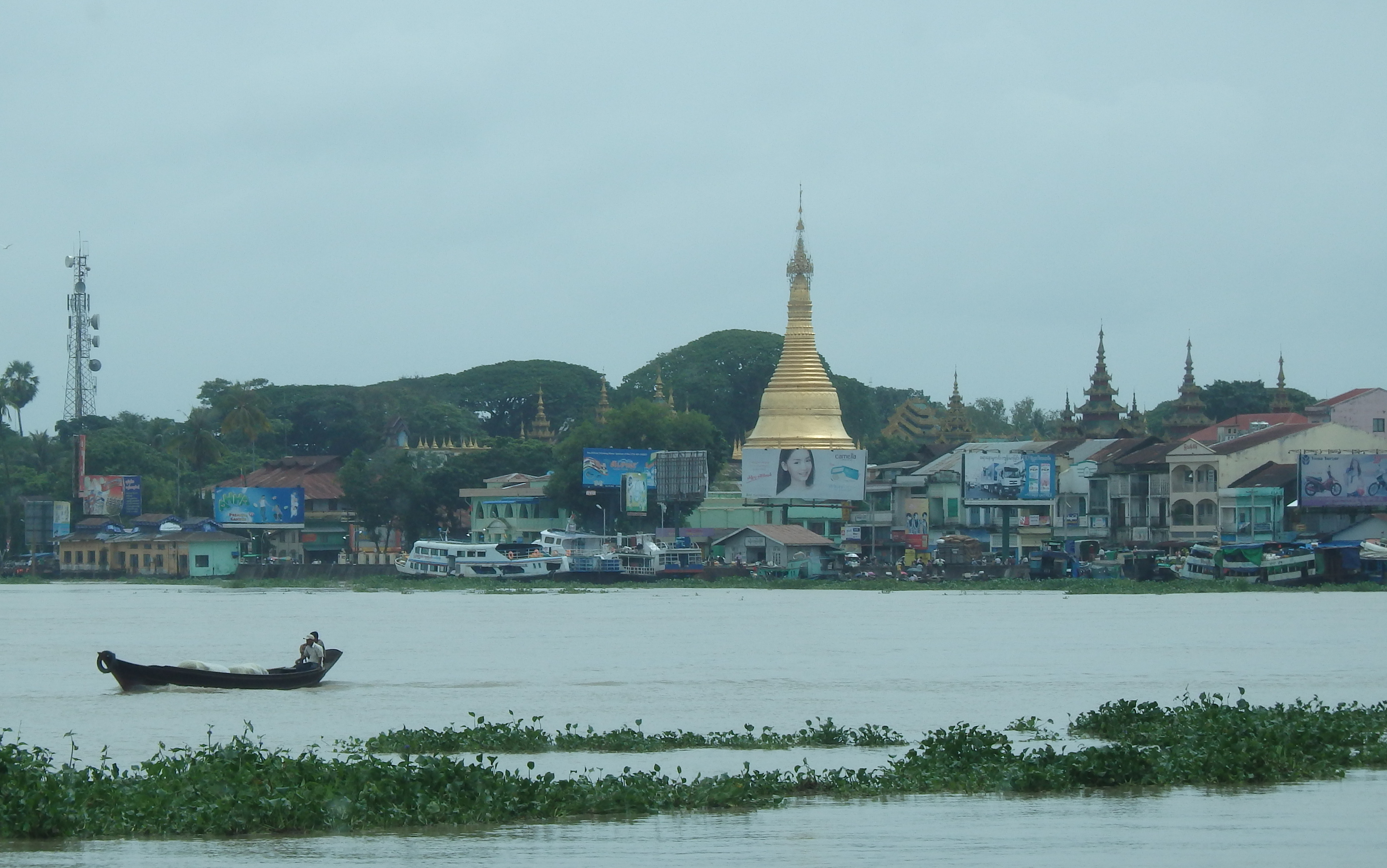
- View of Pathein from the Pathein River

Location
- Country: Myanmar
- Region: Ayeyarwady Region

Physical characteristics
- Source
  - location: Irrawaddy River near Hinthada
  - elevation: 30 ft (9.1 m)
- Mouth
  - location: Andaman Sea
  - elevation: 0 ft (0 m)
- Length: 114 mi (183 km)

Basin features
- Cities: Lemyethna, Ngathaingchaung, Thabaung, Pathein, Ngapudaw, Hainggyi Island

The Pathein River (Burmese: ပုသိမ်မြစ်), formerly called the Bassein River, is the westernmost distributary of the Irrawaddy River in the Irrawaddy delta of Myanmar flowing through Ayeyarwady Region. The river is also interchangeably known as the Ngawun River (Burmese: ငဝန်မြစ်).

Seafaring vessels from Andaman Sea are able to travel about 75 miles (121 km) inland up the Pathein River to the city of Pathein. As far south as Thabaung Township, about 20 miles north of Pathein, the river becomes prone to seasonal flooding in a flood plain environment.

The river also provides fresh water to the city of Pathein through a treatment plant in the village of Mayanchaung.

== Physiography ==
The river diverges from the Ayeyarwady in southeastern Ingapu Township, close to the city of Hinthada. The Pathein river is part of the tide-dominated Irrawaddy delta system and has several distributaries of its own. The overall Pathein distributary system carries less than 10% of the Ayeyarwady River's total discharge volume. It flows southwards and empties into the Andaman Sea next to Hainggyi Island.

== Ecology ==
The mouth of the Pathein River is home to nesting beaches for five species of marine turtles, including the rare Hawksbill sea turtle and Leatherback sea turtle species. Thameehla Island at the mouth of the Pathein River is known to be a major nesting ground for Green sea turtle and is the location of a conservation effort by the Department of Fisheries.
