= Lemyethna =

Town in Ayeyarwady Region, Myanmar

Lemyethna လေးမျက်နှာမြို့
- Town
- Location within Myanmar
- Coordinates: 17°35′53″N 95°10′37″E
- Country: Myanmar
- Region: Ayeyarwady Region
- District: Hinthada District
- Township: Lemyethna Township

Area
  - Total: 1.23 sq mi (3.2 km^{2})
- Elevation: 20 ft (6.1 m)

Population (2023)
  - Total: 3,266
  - Density: 2,660/sq mi (1,030/km^{2})
- Time zone: UTC+6.30 (MMT)

Lemyethna (Burmese: လေးမျက်နှာမြို့; pronounced: LAY-myet-na) is a town in northern Ayeyarwady Region of south-west Myanmar. It is the seat of the Laymyethna Township in the Hinthada District and is located on the eastern bank of the Ngawun River, close to the southern end of the Arakan Mountains.

The town hosts one of the major copper deposits in the country.
