= List of villages in Lemyethna Township =

This is a list of villages in Lemyethna Township, Hinthada District, Ayeyarwady Region, Burma (Myanmar).

Village	Village code	Village tract	Coordinates (links to map & photo sources)	Notes
Kone Su	152765	Htein Ngu	17.6153°N 95.202°E	
Htein Ngu	152763	Htein Ngu	17.641°N 95.2203°E	
Yae Le	152764	Htein Ngu	17.6265°N 95.2084°E	
Hnget Pyaw Taw	152766	Htein Ngu	17.6185°N 95.207°E	
Kant Lant Kone	152767	Htein Ngu		
Gway Taunk Kwin	152768	Htein Ngu	17.6165°N 95.1982°E	
Shwe Ka Nyin Kan Nar Su	158613	Nyaung Pin Wea		
Ma Thea Kone	158610	Nyaung Pin Wea	17.6121°N 95.1677°E	
Nyaung Pin Wea Auk Su	158614	Nyaung Pin Wea		
Shwe Ka Nyin Kyaung Su	158612	Nyaung Pin Wea	17.6149°N 95.1719°E	
Nyaung Pin Wea	158609	Nyaung Pin Wea	17.6227°N 95.1906°E	
Tha Yet Kan	158615	Nyaung Pin Wea	17.6111°N 95.192°E	
Lay Ein Tan	158616	Nyaung Pin Wea	17.6113°N 95.198°E	
Shwe Ka Nyin Pin	158611	Nyaung Pin Wea		
Ka Nyin Kwin	153616	Ka Tet Kone	17.6355°N 95.1895°E	
Ka Tet Kone	153614	Ka Tet Kone	17.6317°N 95.2063°E	
Ywar Thit Su	153615	Ka Tet Kone		
Ywar Thar Kone	153619	Ka Tet Kone	17.6459°N 95.2085°E	
Thar Yar Kone	153618	Ka Tet Kone	17.6374°N 95.2135°E	
Saing Pyun	153617	Ka Tet Kone	17.64°N 95.2113°E	
Thone Set	162758	Thone Set	17.562°N 95.1641°E	
Lel Di Su	162759	Thone Set	17.5836°N 95.1811°E	
Tha Khwar Kone	162760	Thone Set	17.5738°N 95.179°E	
Kayin Yoe	162761	Thone Set		
Kyun U	161583	Tha Khut Chaung	17.6065°N 95.1502°E	
Wea Daunt	161582	Tha Khut Chaung	17.5752°N 95.1634°E	
Oke Aing	161581	Tha Khut Chaung	17.574°N 95.1523°E	
Tha Khut Chaung	161580	Tha Khut Chaung	17.587°N 95.1606°E	
Bo Yon Su	161585	Tha Khut Chaung	17.5994°N 95.1528°E	
Kun Chan Kone	161587	Tha Khut Chaung	17.6056°N 95.1781°E	
Kyun Te	161588	Tha Khut Chaung	17.6022°N 95.1599°E	
Thaung Su	161584	Tha Khut Chaung	17.6041°N 95.145°E	
Gyan Kone	161586	Tha Khut Chaung	17.6056°N 95.1597°E	
Lay Ein Tan	159936	Sar Yay Kwin		
Sar Yay Kwin	159933	Sar Yay Kwin	17.5995°N 95.2106°E	
Kyon Pi	159934	Sar Yay Kwin	17.5882°N 95.2057°E	
Ngwe Tain Hnyin	159937	Sar Yay Kwin		
Aung Baw Su	159938	Sar Yay Kwin	17.6067°N 95.1963°E	
Sit Kone	159935	Sar Yay Kwin	17.5993°N 95.1895°E	
Khon Gyi	151415	Daunt Gyi	17.59°N 95.1533°E	
Yae Thoe	151414	Daunt Gyi	17.5738°N 95.1177°E	
Hnget Pyaw Taw	151413	Daunt Gyi		
Myin Kyoe Chaung	151412	Daunt Gyi	17.5629°N 95.1586°E	
Daunt Gyi	151411	Daunt Gyi	17.5709°N 95.1478°E	
Daunt Gyi	162408	Thein Kone	17.5812°N 95.1982°E	
Nyaung Waing	162407	Thein Kone	17.5793°N 95.2051°E	
Kyat Kone	162409	Thein Kone	17.5651°N 95.2012°E	
Kha Paung Kwin	162410	Thein Kone	17.563°N 95.1972°E	
Thein Kone	162406	Thein Kone	17.573°N 95.2034°E	
Ywar Thit Kone	156485	La Har Gyi		
La Har Gyi	156480	La Har Gyi	17.5497°N 95.2485°E	
Ka Nyin Pin Hla	156481	La Har Gyi	17.5387°N 95.2405°E	
Ywar Thar Kone	156482	La Har Gyi	17.5394°N 95.2555°E	
Sin Ku	156484	La Har Gyi		
Kywe Sar Inn	156483	La Har Gyi	17.533°N 95.2376°E	
Kyar Inn	163050	War Yon Chaung	17.5763°N 95.2371°E	
Kone Gyi	163049	War Yon Chaung	17.5973°N 95.2233°E	
Yoe Gyi	163048	War Yon Chaung	17.5915°N 95.2389°E	
War Yon Chaung	163047	War Yon Chaung	17.5662°N 95.25°E	
Ah Kei	163051	War Yon Chaung	17.59°N 95.2525°E	
Kyan Taw Su (Kayin)	159348	Pein Inn	17.54°N 95.23°E	
Moe Ma Kha Lay	159346	Pein Inn	17.559°N 95.2272°E	
Moe Ma Kha Gyi	159345	Pein Inn	17.5474°N 95.224°E	
Han Thar Aye	159351	Pein Inn	17.5224°N 95.2188°E	
Ah Lel Su	159350	Pein Inn	17.5535°N 95.213°E	
Kyaung Kone	159344	Pein Inn	17.5699°N 95.2253°E	
Yone Taw	159349	Pein Inn	17.5497°N 95.2063°E	
Kywe Mee Swea	159343	Pein Inn	17.5627°N 95.2356°E	
Ma Yan Yoe	159342	Pein Inn	17.5473°N 95.2169°E	
Za Yit Yoe	159341	Pein Inn		
Ah Lone Gyi	159340	Pein Inn	17.5286°N 95.2226°E	
Kyee Taw Kone	159339	Pein Inn	17.5356°N 95.2263°E	
Kyan Taw Su (Myanmar)	159347	Pein Inn	17.5495°N 95.2294°E	
Meik Tha Lin Kone	159337	Pein Inn	17.5397°N 95.2073°E	
Baw Tha Lin	159336	Pein Inn	17.5323°N 95.2167°E	
Gway Cho	159335	Pein Inn	17.5612°N 95.2131°E	
Pein Inn	159334	Pein Inn	17.5493°N 95.2142°E	
Pyaung Inn	159338	Pein Inn	17.5266°N 95.2202°E	
Shar Hpyu Kyin	160236	Shar Hpyu Kyin	17.5242°N 95.2012°E	
Ah Choke Gyi	160237	Shar Hpyu Kyin	17.508°N 95.2072°E	
U To	160238	Shar Hpyu Kyin	17.5005°N 95.2015°E	
Kyoet Kone	151852	Gyoe Gyar Kwin	17.5256°N 95.1877°E	
Kywe Sar Inn	151855	Gyoe Gyar Kwin	17.5312°N 95.1906°E	
Gyoe Gyar Kwin	151851	Gyoe Gyar Kwin	17.5185°N 95.1857°E	
Kone Ka Lay (a) Pan Tin Kone	151853	Gyoe Gyar Kwin	17.5247°N 95.1958°E	
Ywar Thit Su (a) Ywar Thit Kone	151854	Gyoe Gyar Kwin	17.5209°N 95.1879°E	
Hle Lan Kyaung	152792	Htein Taw Gyi	17.4968°N 95.172°E	
Ah Lel Yoe	152791	Htein Taw Gyi	17.4949°N 95.1803°E	
Daunt Gyi	152790	Htein Taw Gyi	17.4923°N 95.1781°E	
Htaw Lar	152789	Htein Taw Gyi	17.4902°N 95.1805°E	
Zee Kone	152788	Htein Taw Gyi	17.4969°N 95.1855°E	
Htein Taw Gyi	152787	Htein Taw Gyi	17.4923°N 95.188°E	
Htein Pin La Har	152793	Htein Taw Gyi	17.5051°N 95.1726°E	
Koe Te Kwin	163373	Yae Nauk		
Yae Nauk	163370	Yae Nauk	17.4776°N 95.1786°E	
Gaung Ni Kwin	163372	Yae Nauk	17.4941°N 95.1974°E	
Kyan Taw Kone	163371	Yae Nauk		
Tar U Toe	150931	Boke Chaung	17.4963°N 95.112°E	
Nyaung Kone	150932	Boke Chaung	17.4955°N 95.1023°E	
Boke Chaung	150928	Boke Chaung	17.4849°N 95.0956°E	
Htein Kyaw	150930	Boke Chaung	17.4891°N 95.1034°E	
Zee Chaung	150929	Boke Chaung	17.4859°N 95.1101°E	
Shwe Bo Su	160156	Shan	17.4989°N 95.1348°E	
Ywar Thit Kone	160157	Shan	17.523°N 95.1253°E	
Shan Ywar Daunt Te	160154	Shan	17.5095°N 95.1413°E	
Zin Pyun Kone	160155	Shan	17.5079°N 95.1308°E	
Tha Yet Taw	153530	Ka Nyin Thaung		
Myit Kyoe	153531	Ka Nyin Thaung	17.4835°N 95.1162°E	
Ma Gyi Pin Kwin	153532	Ka Nyin Thaung		
Kone Gyi	153533	Ka Nyin Thaung	17.4889°N 95.132°E	
Nyaung Pin Kwin	153534	Ka Nyin Thaung	17.4803°N 95.1359°E	
Ywar Thit Kone	153535	Ka Nyin Thaung		
Na Kyee Kone	153536	Ka Nyin Thaung	17.4814°N 95.1423°E	
Koe Te	154460	Koe Te	17.4894°N 95.1725°E	
Kyaung Su	154462	Koe Te	17.4907°N 95.1577°E	
San Paing	154461	Koe Te	17.4994°N 95.1589°E	
Me Za Li	157458	Me Za Li	17.4905°N 95.0918°E	
Thaung Tan	157460	Me Za Li	17.451°N 95.0758°E	
Pauk Kone	157459	Me Za Li	17.4567°N 95.0812°E	
Yin Se	163652	Yin Se	17.5176°N 95.0885°E	
Pauk Kone	150439	Aing Tha Pyu	17.552°N 95.1824°E	
Aing Tha Pyu (a) Yan Gyi Aung	150433	Aing Tha Pyu		
Aing Tha Pyu	150427	Aing Tha Pyu	17.5368°N 95.1717°E	
Kan Nar Su	150428	Aing Tha Pyu		
Let Tha Mar (a) Shwe Bo Su	150429	Aing Tha Pyu		
Kyaung Su (a) Man Chaung	150430	Aing Tha Pyu		
Baw Di Kone	150432	Aing Tha Pyu	17.5558°N 95.192°E	
Kwin Ma Tar Lay	150434	Aing Tha Pyu	17.538°N 95.1853°E	
Kwin Ma Kyaung Su	150435	Aing Tha Pyu		
Ma Yin Myauk	150436	Aing Tha Pyu	17.5372°N 95.1921°E	
Wet Sin Aing	150438	Aing Tha Pyu	17.5558°N 95.1842°E	
Ah Nyar Tan	150431	Aing Tha Pyu		
Ywar Thit Kone	150440	Aing Tha Pyu	17.552°N 95.1881°E	
Kyaung Gyi Paing	150441	Aing Tha Pyu		
Zay Tar Lay	150442	Aing Tha Pyu		
Kan Nar Tan	150443	Aing Tha Pyu		
Kone Ka lay	150437	Aing Tha Pyu	17.5335°N 95.195°E	
Let Tha Mar (Kayin)	156943	Let Tha Mar (Kayin)	17.5323°N 95.1675°E	
Hnan Kone	156946	Let Tha Mar (Myanmar)	17.5313°N 95.1503°E	
Aing Zauk	156945	Let Tha Mar (Myanmar)	17.5267°N 95.1406°E	
Let Tha Mar (Myanmar)	156944	Let Tha Mar (Myanmar)	17.5283°N 95.1599°E	
Khway Thay	156947	Let Tha Mar (Myanmar)	17.522°N 95.1491°E	
Thaung Poke	151094	Chauk Se	17.5029°N 95.1106°E	
Hlay Swea Lay	151095	Chauk Se	17.5047°N 95.1231°E	
Ah Lel Kyun	151093	Chauk Se	17.5111°N 95.1138°E	
Auk Yoe	151092	Chauk Se	17.5192°N 95.1071°E	
Yoe Gyi	151091	Chauk Se	17.527°N 95.1135°E	
Hlay Swea Gyi	151089	Chauk Se	17.5313°N 95.1346°E	
Hnan Kone	151088	Chauk Se	17.5337°N 95.145°E	
Wea Gyi	151087	Chauk Se	17.5347°N 95.1568°E	
Let Pan Kone	151086	Chauk Se	17.5533°N 95.1603°E	
Chauk Se	151085	Chauk Se	17.5403°N 95.1673°E	
Ku Lar Yoe	151090	Chauk Se	17.5313°N 95.1275°E	
Khat Tu	151827	Kyee Pauk Kone	17.6044°N 95.1375°E	
Zee Taw	151821	Kyee Pauk Kone	17.6132°N 95.1403°E	
Daunt Kway	151820	Kyee Pauk Kone	17.6185°N 95.1341°E	
Nin Kyan	151819	Kyee Pauk Kone	17.6196°N 95.1261°E	
Pan Taw Pauk	151824	Kyee Pauk Kone	17.6496°N 95.0874°E	
Sin Thay	151825	Kyee Pauk Kone		
Myin Kone	151818	Kyee Pauk Kone	17.6365°N 95.1132°E	
Myo Ma	151826	Kyee Pauk Kone	17.6013°N 95.1386°E	
Kyee Pauk Kone	155470	Kyee Pauk Kone	17.6383°N 95.1035°E	
Si Son Kone	151823	Kyee Pauk Kone	17.6389°N 95.0883°E	
Hle Ku	151822	Kyee Pauk Kone		
Kayin Taw	150828	Bi Tha Lun	17.6207°N 95.1704°E	
Baw Di	150829	Bi Tha Lun	17.6266°N 95.176°E	
War Yon Su	150830	Bi Tha Lun	17.6274°N 95.1864°E	
Bi Tha Lun	150827	Bi Tha Lun	17.6123°N 95.1501°E	
Lel Tan Nge	159103	Pan Taw Gyi	17.6775°N 95.0756°E	
Tha Yet Kone	159096	Pan Taw Gyi	17.6637°N 95.0713°E	
Myo Kone	159095	Pan Taw Gyi	17.6556°N 95.0714°E	
Pan Taw Gyi	159094	Pan Taw Gyi	17.6456°N 95.068°E	
Kyauk Sa Yit Kone	159099	Pan Taw Gyi	17.6683°N 95.0706°E	
Pi Tauk Pin	159100	Pan Taw Gyi	17.6724°N 95.0826°E	
Kyat Gyi	159097	Pan Taw Gyi	17.6447°N 95.048°E	
Aung Baw Su (West)	159102	Pan Taw Gyi	17.6603°N 95.0893°E	
Ma Gyi Pin Kwin	159098	Pan Taw Gyi	17.663°N 95.0757°E	
Hnget Pyaw Taw Kwin	159106	Pan Taw Gyi	17.6663°N 95.0477°E	
Yoe Da Yar Kwin	159105	Pan Taw Gyi	17.6878°N 95.0487°E	
Su Toe Kwin	159104	Pan Taw Gyi	17.6837°N 95.0569°E	
Shauk Pin Su	159101	Pan Taw Gyi		
Kyan Taw Su	154672	Kun Chan Kone	17.6498°N 95.0913°E	
Hpa Yar Kone	154664	Kun Chan Kone	17.6898°N 95.0878°E	
Hle Ku	154671	Kun Chan Kone	17.6538°N 95.089°E	
Nat Hta Min Kone	154669	Kun Chan Kone	17.6663°N 95.0996°E	
Kun Chan Kone	154661	Kun Chan Kone	17.6611°N 95.0975°E	
Ah Lel Kone	154668	Kun Chan Kone	17.6711°N 95.096°E	
Bant Bway Kone	154663	Kun Chan Kone	17.6938°N 95.0831°E	
Ah Lel Yoe	154666	Kun Chan Kone	17.6819°N 95.0923°E	
Min Ga Lar Kone	154662	Kun Chan Kone	17.6858°N 95.0808°E	
Aung Baw (East)	154670	Kun Chan Kone		
Nin Kyan U	154665	Kun Chan Kone	17.6872°N 95.0957°E	
Gway Tauk Kwin	154667	Kun Chan Kone	17.6755°N 95.0941°E	
Sin Thay	154673	Kun Chan Kone	17.6474°N 95.0935°E	
Gyoet Kone	150816	Beit Pyar Kone	17.6861°N 95.0783°E	
Shauk Kone	150815	Beit Pyar Kone	17.6875°N 95.0763°E	
Thar Si Kone	150814	Beit Pyar Kone	17.6916°N 95.0649°E	
Beit Pyar Kone	150813	Beit Pyar Kone	17.6904°N 95.07°E	
War Taw Kwin	163035	War Taw Kwin	17.6989°N 95.0171°E	
Htauk Kyant Kwin	163036	War Taw Kwin	17.6968°N 95.0389°E	
Kyar Kaik	151233	Chin Kone	17.6055°N 95.0527°E	
Pan Tin	151231	Chin Kone		
Kyee Kone	151230	Chin Kone	17.6057°N 95.0784°E	
Shan Kwin	151232	Chin Kone	17.6167°N 95.0667°E	
Sein Baung	151227	Chin Kone	17.5921°N 95.0755°E	
Nyaung Chay Htauk	151228	Chin Kone	17.6002°N 95.0757°E	
Nga Poke Kwin	151226	Chin Kone	17.5985°N 95.0715°E	
Chin Kone	151225	Chin Kone	17.6088°N 95.0658°E	
Nga Bat Sein	151234	Chin Kone		
Zay Kone	151235	Chin Kone		
Yae Hpyu	151229	Chin Kone	17.6145°N 95.0804°E	
Thea Nu Kone	162379	Thea Nu Kone	17.5982°N 95.0639°E	
Nat Hta Min Kone	162385	Thea Nu Kone	17.5837°N 95.062°E	
Hman Tan	162384	Thea Nu Kone		
Sein Baung	162383	Thea Nu Kone	17.5927°N 95.0743°E	
Htone Bo	162382	Thea Nu Kone	17.5871°N 95.0519°E	
Saw Pyar	162381	Thea Nu Kone	17.5907°N 95.0462°E	
Kyar Kaik	162380	Thea Nu Kone	17.6039°N 95.05°E	
Nga Poke Kwin	162386	Thea Nu Kone		
Hlaw Ka Htar	157693	Moe Goke	17.5642°N 95.0781°E	
Kayin Se	157695	Moe Goke	17.5369°N 95.0968°E	
Auk Su	157694	Moe Goke	17.556°N 95.077°E	
Sein Taung	157692	Moe Goke	17.5716°N 95.0706°E	
Moe Goke	157691	Moe Goke	17.5667°N 95.0833°E	
Ah Choke Ka Lay (South)	154207	Kha Mauk Su	17.5139°N 95.2274°E	
Than Bar Yar Yoe	154209	Kha Mauk Su	17.5262°N 95.2302°E	
Shwe Sar Yay	154211	Kha Mauk Su	17.5239°N 95.2362°E	
Inn Ka Lay Kone	154212	Kha Mauk Su	17.5248°N 95.2327°E	
Nyaung Tan	154213	Kha Mauk Su	17.517°N 95.2425°E	
Shar Khe Su	154215	Kha Mauk Su	17.4914°N 95.2406°E	
Ah Choke Ka Lay (North)	154208	Kha Mauk Su	17.5159°N 95.2313°E	
Aing To	154216	Kha Mauk Su		
Yit Hpauk Kone	154214	Kha Mauk Su	17.5°N 95.2517°E	
Htauk Shar Pin Seik	154205	Kha Mauk Su	17.5067°N 95.2511°E	
Sin Thay Kone	154210	Kha Mauk Su	17.5227°N 95.2297°E	
Ma Yan Aing	154204	Kha Mauk Su	17.5056°N 95.2319°E	
Boe Thar Nyo Yoe	154206	Kha Mauk Su	17.5321°N 95.2556°E	
Kha Mauk Su	154203	Kha Mauk Su	17.5166°N 95.2522°E	
Si Kwin	152017	Hle Htauk Kwin	17.5539°N 95.0389°E	
Pu Zun Seik chaung	152014	Hle Htauk Kwin	17.5276°N 95.0288°E	
Yae Thoe Chaung	152016	Hle Htauk Kwin	17.5631°N 95.0457°E	
Hle Htauk Kwin	152013	Hle Htauk Kwin	17.5597°N 95.05°E	
Thin Gan Chaung	152015	Hle Htauk Kwin	17.5616°N 95.0592°E	
Lel U Su	151979	Hlaw Ka Htar	17.5654°N 95.059°E	
Auk Su	151981	Hlaw Ka Htar	17.5533°N 95.077°E	
Saw Pyar	151985	Hlaw Ka Htar	17.5923°N 95.0438°E	
U Yin Kone	151984	Hlaw Ka Htar	17.566°N 95.0349°E	
Taung Pay Kone	151983	Hlaw Ka Htar	17.5836°N 95.0306°E	
Kyoet Kone	151982	Hlaw Ka Htar	17.5851°N 95.0322°E	
Sein Taung	151980	Hlaw Ka Htar	17.5735°N 95.0713°E	
San Gyi	151978	Hlaw Ka Htar	17.576°N 95.0564°E	
Hlaw Ka Htar	151977	Hlaw Ka Htar	17.5634°N 95.0737°E	
Aung Sa Kwin	154838	Kwin Gyi	17.6186°N 95.0074°E	
Zee Pin Kwin	154839	Kwin Gyi	17.6065°N 94.9936°E	
Kwin Gyi	154836	Kwin Gyi	17.6223°N 94.9976°E	
Hman Si	154837	Kwin Gyi	17.6204°N 94.9935°E	
Le Khon Gyi	154840	Kwin Gyi	17.6296°N 94.9823°E	
Tone Taw	163219	Wut Kone	17.6281°N 95.0379°E	
San Kone	163218	Wut Kone	17.6359°N 95.0341°E	
Le Khon Lay	163217	Wut Kone	17.6682°N 94.9964°E	
Shar Taw Su	163216	Wut Kone	17.6587°N 95.001°E	
Wut Kone	163212	Wut Kone	17.6401°N 95.017°E	
Kyoet Pin Su	163213	Wut Kone	17.6473°N 95.0048°E	
Gyeik Kwin	163214	Wut Kone	17.652°N 95.0001°E	
Tha Yet Pin Gyi Su	163215	Wut Kone	17.6498°N 95.0045°E	
Kyaung Kwin	163220	Wut Kone	17.6559°N 95.002°E	
Ya Htar Kwin	153514	Ka Nyin Taing	17.6076°N 95.0259°E	
Sein Kwin	153526	Ka Nyin Taing		
Myay Ni Taung	153529	Ka Nyin Taing	17.5989°N 95.0313°E	
Tone Taw	153528	Ka Nyin Taing		
Ka Nyin Taing	153513	Ka Nyin Taing	17.6089°N 95.0272°E	
Ma Gyi Kone	153522	Ka Nyin Taing	17.6°N 95.0167°E	
Khat Cho Kone	153527	Ka Nyin Taing	17.5886°N 95.0291°E	
Nga Bat Sein	153518	Ka Nyin Taing		
Gyee Kyi	153519	Ka Nyin Taing	17.6146°N 95.048°E	
Taung Ka Lay	153525	Ka Nyin Taing	17.5916°N 95.0239°E	
Su Poke Kone	153521	Ka Nyin Taing	17.5984°N 95.0192°E	
Kyaung Kwin	153515	Ka Nyin Taing	17.6127°N 95.0284°E	
Taung Kone	153523	Ka Nyin Taing	17.6057°N 95.0083°E	
Bant Bway Kone	153524	Ka Nyin Taing	17.5999°N 95.0074°E	
Taung Poet Pi	153517	Ka Nyin Taing	17.607°N 95.0389°E	
Taw	153516	Ka Nyin Taing	17.615°N 95.0376°E	
Hman Tan	153520	Ka Nyin Taing	17.6007°N 95.032°E	
Ma Yan Kone	151239	Chin Lel	17.5678°N 94.9948°E	
Chin Lel	151238	Chin Lel	17.5665°N 94.9982°E	
