= Shwemokhtaw Pagoda =

Buddhist Pagoda in Pathein, Myanmar

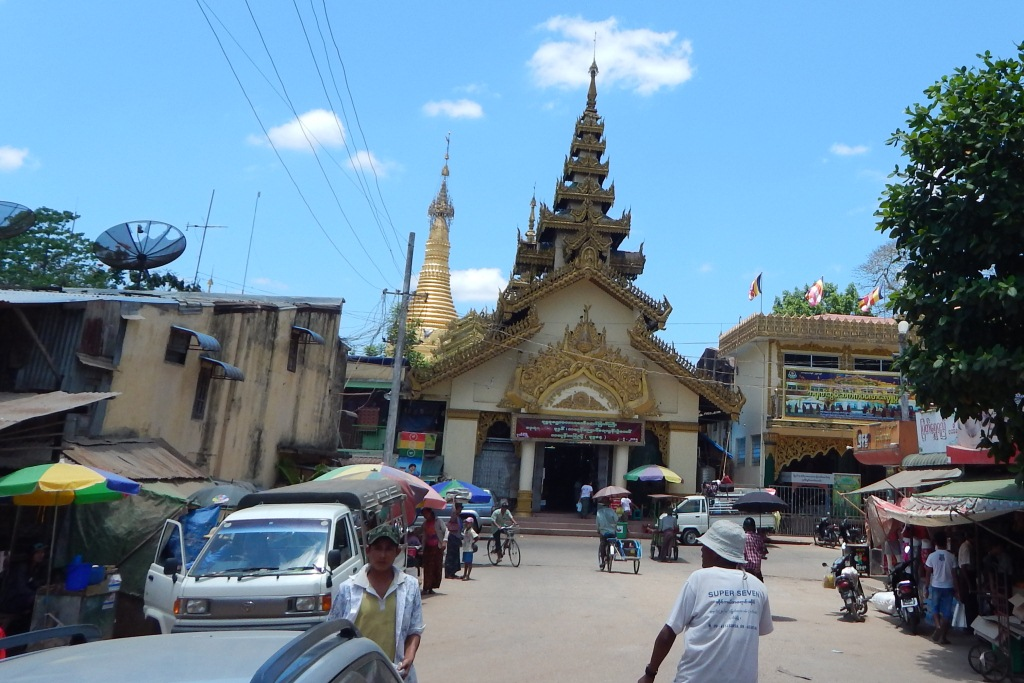
- Shwemokhtaw Pagoda

- Location within Myanmar

Religion
- Affiliation: Theravada Buddhism

Location
- Location: Pathein, Ayeyarwady Region,
- Country: Burma (Myanmar)
- Interactive map of Shwemokhtaw Pagoda
- Coordinates: 16.7817°N 94.7321°E

Architecture
- Founder: King Alaungsithu
- Completed: 1115; 911 years ago

Shwemokhtaw Pagoda (Burmese: ရွှေမုဋ္ဌောစေတီ) is a Buddhist pagoda in Pathein, Myanmar (formerly Bassein, Burma). It is bounded by Merchant St, Strand, Mahabandoola Road and Shwezedi Road. At its southern pavilion is a revered image of the Buddha, Thiho-shin Phondawpyi (သီဟိုဠ်ရှင် ဘုန်းတော်ပြည့် ဘုရား). It hosts a pagoda festival during the full moon of Kason (April/May), marking Visakha.

According to tradition, Shwemokhtaw Pagoda was founded by King Asoka of India in 305 BC. Bagan's King Alaungsithu raised the height of the stupa to 11 metres (36 ft) in 1115 AD, and the Mon King Samodogossa raised it to 131 feet (40 m) in 1263. It is now 153 feet (47 m) tall, its top tier made of 13.9 pounds (6.3 kg) of solid gold, the middle tier of pure silver and the bottom tier of bronze, with some 829 diamonds, 843 rubies and 1588 semiprecious stones.
