= Ngapudaw =

Ngapudaw ငပုတောမြို့
- Town
- Location in Burma
- Coordinates: 16°32′16″N 94°41′37″E
- Country: Myanmar
- Region: Ayeyarwady Region
- District: Pathein District
- Township: Ngapudaw Township

Area
  - Total: 0.44 sq mi (1.14 km^{2})

Population (2014)
  - Total: 10,632
  - Density: 24,200/sq mi (9,330/km^{2})
  - Ethnicities: Bamar; Karen
  - Religions: Buddhism
- Time zone: UTC+6.30 (MST)

Ngapudaw (Burmese: ငပုတောမြို့, MLCTS: nga.pu.tau-mrui. Burmese pronunciation: [ŋəpṵdɔ̀mjo̰]) is a town in the Ayeyarwady Region of south-west Burma (Myanmar). It is the seat of the Ngapudaw Township in the Pathein District. The town is divided into 4 wards and lies on the Ngawun river.

== Etymology ==
The Burmese term ငပုတော literally translates to "forest of short people." According to oral legend, this derives from the town being settled by short Karen people.
