= Hainggyi Island (town) =

Haigyi Island ဟိုင်းကြီးကျွန်း
- Town
- Hainggyikyun
- Location within Myanmar
- Coordinates: 16°00′59″N 94°20′23″E
- Country: Myanmar
- Region: Ayeyarwady Region
- District: Pathein
- Township: Ngapudaw Township
- Subtownship: Hainggyikyun Subtownship

Area
  - Total: 14.09 km^{2} (5.44 sq mi)

Population (2014)
  - Total: 14,019
  - Density: 995.0/km^{2} (2,577/sq mi)
- Time zone: UTC6:30 (MST)

Hainggyi Island (Burmese: ဟိုင်းကြီးကျွန်း, also spelt Haigyi Island or Hainggyikyun) is a town on Hainggyi Island located at the mouth of the Pathein River (formerly Bassein River) in the Ayeyarwady Region of south-west Myanmar. It is the primary town within Hainggyikyun Subtownship within Ngapudaw Township in the Pathein District.

The town has an area of 5.44 square miles (14.1 km^{2}).

The Pammawaddy Regional Command of the Myanmar Navy is headquartered in Hainggyi Island. The naval base used to host a few PLA personnel from China. According to Andrew Selth, claims of a massive PLA base on Hainggyi Island are plainly incorrect and gained popularity because of hysterical quotations by commentators.
