= Ngapudaw Township =

Ngapudaw Township ငပုတောမြို့နယ်
- Township
- Location in Pathein district
- Coordinates: 16°21′N 94°29′E
- Country: Myanmar
- Region: Ayeyarwady Region
- District: Pathein District
- Capital: Ngapudaw

Area
  - Total: 1,404.18 sq mi (3,636.81 km^{2})
- Elevation: 30.28 ft (9.23 m)
- Highest elevation: 1,325 ft (404 m)

Population (2023)
  - Total: 321,031
  - Density: 228.625/sq mi (88.2727/km^{2})
- Time zone: UTC+6:30 (MMt)

Ngapudaw Township or Ngaputaw Township (Burmese: ငပုတောမြို့နယ်) is a township of Pathein District in the Ayeyarwady Region of Myanmar. The western portion of the township includes Ngayokaung Subtownship and the southern portion of the township includes Hainggyikyun Subtownship, both unofficial divisions used by the Township for statistical and administrative ease. The small village of Kyounku within Hainggyikyun Subtownship is the birthplace of former President of Myanmar Thein Sein.

The township borders Pathein Township and Kangyidaunt Township to its north. To its east, it borders Myaungmya Township, Myaungmya District and Labutta Township, Labutta District. There are two subtownships, three towns, 9 wards, 83 village-tracts and 411 villages in Ngapudaw Township. The principal town of the township is Ngapudaw.

== History ==
During the Bagan Dynasty, the Mon town of Kyaik Padaw was recorded as one of the 32 towns under the administration of Pathein. Kyaik Padaw is thought to be located within Ngapudaw Township on the banks of the Pammawaddy River. However, the first concrete creation of the town of Ngapudaw would not be until the formation of British Burma in the 19th century after the Second Anglo-Burmese War. The township itself would be created in the late 19th century after the annexation of Lower Burma by the British.

== Geography ==
Ngapudaw Township is located on the southwestern edge of Irrawaddy Delta with a significant deltaic coastline on the Andaman Sea. The southernmost portions of the Arakan Mountains stretch through the township's west dividing the low-lying east from the long western shore on the Bay of Bengal. Steep forested mountains characterize the western part of the township ending in Cape Negrais. The mountains extend further into the sea to form the Andaman Islands.

The township has 108 miles of coastline, with only 50 miles of deep-water coastline. The highest peak in the township is Mt. Taungpetkyi at 1,325 feet (404 m) above sea level. The township is located in a mountainous tropical zone with a heavy monsoon presence, seeing 95 days of rain totalling 100.9 inches (256 cm) of rain in an average year. The temperature variation is more moderate than more northern tropical mountainous townships with average highs and lows range between 31.3°C and 20.8°C.

The township has large undeveloped and natural areas, particularly in the west. There are many tree species including teak, Burmese ironwood, jackfruit, tamarind as well as other flora like Dipterocarpus and nipa palms. There are also diverse fauna with elephants, boars, black bears, gaur and goats. Ngapudaw township lies on the southern forest fringe of Ayeyarwady Region, an area with the highest deforestation rates in the area with forested lands dropping from 15.3% to 14% of the area in 2014 alone.

Off the coast of Ngapudaw Township lies the Thameehla Island (or Turtle Island) where a turtle breeding and conservation camp is located. Further into the Andaman Sea is Alguada Reef. On the southern coast, there are yardang-like formations on the Kyaukkalat Coast near Dedu Gone village.

== Demographics ==
Historical Population
Year	Ngapudaw Township	±%
2014	324,479	—
2018	327,983	+1.1%
2019	328,077	+0.0%
2022	320,869	−2.2%
2023	321,031	+0.1%
Source: Ministry of Labor, Immigration, and Population and General Administration Department data

Pyapon Township is relatively rural with 91.2% of the population in 2019 living outside of the three towns Ngapudaw, Ngayokaung and Hainggyikyun. The majority religion is Buddhism, practiced by 67.5% of the population with the second largest religious group being Christians at 27.3%. Most people live within the east with western Ngayokaung Subtownship only having 12.6% of the total population.

== Economy ==
The economy of Ngapudaw Township is experiencing slow growth. Like most of Ayeyarwady Region, is primarily agriculture with as secondary fishing industry. The primary crop is rice with a significant off-season peanut and pulses. There is also a sizeable salt production industry - mostly produced through sun-drying. The hilsa fish is one of the most important fish for the township's small fishing community with little fish conservation or management in place within the township.

The township has seven large dams to control flooding and saltwater intrusions. The primary means of transport within the township is through riverine transport with the main export markets being Pathein, Myaungmya and Yangon Region.

The Pammawaddy Regional Command of the Myanmar Navy is headquartered within the township in the town of Hainggyi Island.

== See also ==
- List of villages in Ngapudaw Township
