= Pathein =

Capital of Ayeyarwady Region, Myanmar

Pathein ပုသိမ်မြို့ Bassein
- Capital Town
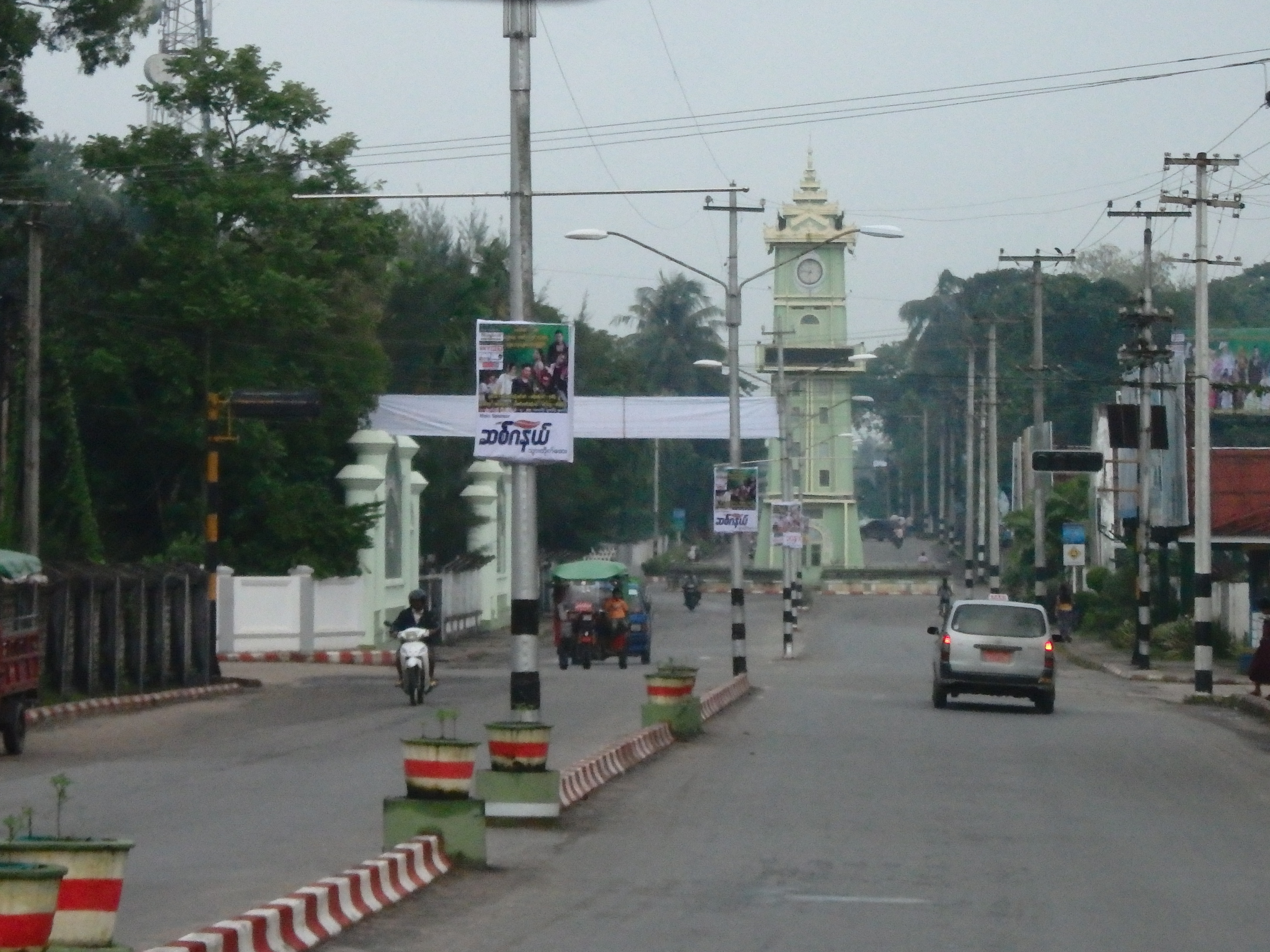
- Downtown Pathein, with view of Clock Tower

- Location of Pathein, Myanmar (Burma)
- Coordinates: 16°47′03″N 94°44′0″E
- Country: Myanmar
- Region: Ayeyarwady Region
- District: Pathein District
- Township: Pathein Township

Government
  - Mayor: U Maung Maung Oo

Area
  - Capital Town: 9.79 sq mi (25.4 km^{2})

Population (2019)
  - Capital Town: 172,923
  - Density: 17,700/sq mi (6,820/km^{2})
  - Metro: 287,071
  - Ethnicities: Bamar; Kayin; Mon; Rakhine; Burmese Chinese; Burmese Indians
  - Religions: Buddhism; Christianity; Islam; Nat worship
- Time zone: UTC+6.30 (MST)
- Area code: 42

Pathein (/ˈpəθeɪn/ pa-THAYN; Burmese: ပုသိမ်မြို့, MLCTS: pu. sim mrui., [pəθèɪ̯ɰ̃ mjo̰]; Mon: ဖာသီ, [pʰasɛm]), formerly called Bassein, is the largest city and the capital of the Ayeyarwady Region, Myanmar. It is located 190 km (120 mi) west of Yangon within Pathein Township on the bank of the Pathein River—a western branch of the Irrawaddy River. The city had a population of 172,923 in 2019. Although once a part of the Mon kingdoms, Pathein has few ethnic Mon residents today. The majority are of Bamar ethnicity with significant Karen, Indian, Rakhine and Chinese populations.

== Etymology ==
The name is believed to derive from the Old Mon name, ဖာသီ ([pha sɛm]). "pha" means great or wide and sī/sɛm means river or sea. Pha-sɛm means a big sea. The name was corrupted to Bassein during the British colonial period.

An alternate theory holds that the city's name comes from the classical name of Pathein, Kusimanagara, a name used by ancient writings and the Kalyani inscriptions. Pathein itself is a corruption of Mon "Kuthen," which itself is a contraction of Kusima or Kusimanagara, a Pali name for the city. This is supported by the fact that the Portuguese call Pathein "Cosmim."

Another theory is that modern name Pathein potentially derives from this time period based on the word Patkain, a version of the archaic Burmese word for Muslims pathi (Burmese: ပသီ), based on either the growing presence of Arab traders in Pathein during the 16th century or on a purported Muslim Indian who ruled the city around 1233 CE.

== History ==
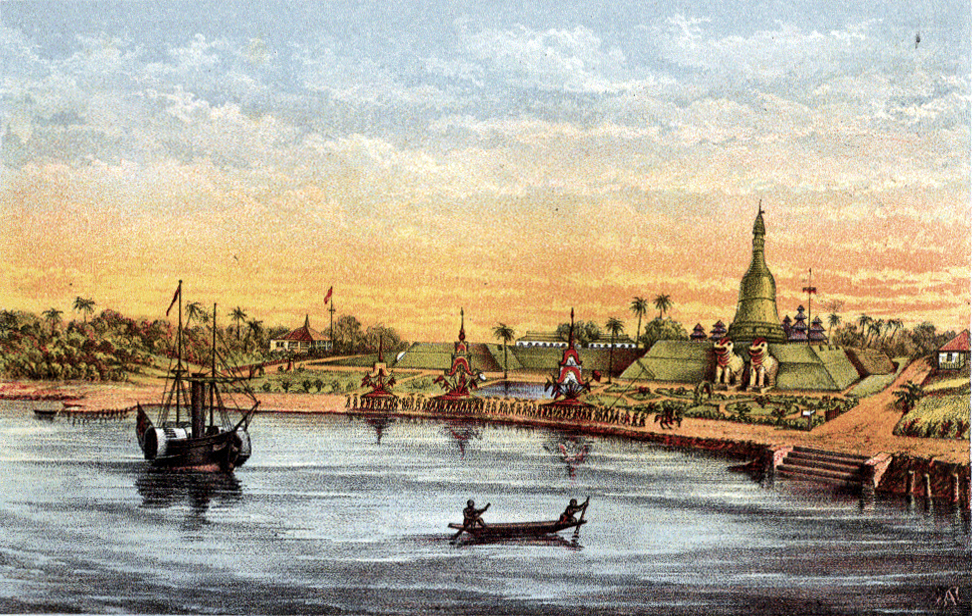
An artist's rendition of the Bassein shoreline in 1878.

According to local history, the city was first a town called Thinsawanargara (Burmese: သဉ္စဝနာဂရ) was founded in 325 BCE by a King "Sri Dhammasoka". The first extant record of a settlement in the location called Kusima in the Pali language comes from a Sri Lankan rock inscription dated to 1165 CE. It is often mentioned that the city was part of Buddhist Mon kingdoms prior to the expansion of the Bagan Empire, however detailed research into the city's history is not extensive.

Pathein was raided in 1180 CE by Parakramabahu I of the Kingdom of Polonnaruwa in modern-day Sri Lanka, as attested by the Devanagala Rock inscription during the Polonnaruwa-Bagan War. The raid was retaliatory against diplomatic incidents and hostility by Sithu II of Bagan, implying that Pathein was under Bagan rule by this time. The Bagan conquest of Lower Burma occurred earlier in 1057 under the reign of Anawrahta. However, various historians disagree on the extent of the empire and his military campaigns. The latest date that Pathein could have become part of the Bagan empire is in 1265 CE where we have the oldest Burmese record of the city's existence.

Until the 15th century, most of Lower Burma was largely jungle and swamp land with little development. Burmese ports like Pathein were known by traders as early as the 10th or 11th century. However, it was only in the 14th century during the rise of the Hanthawaddy kingdom, a Mon kingdom based on Pegu that brought Lower Burma to prominence as a trading hub.

In 1852, the British established a fort and garrison in the city after the First Anglo-Burmese War. The city grew during the colonial period as the terminus of a railroad line, becoming a rice-milling and export center as a port accessible to large vehicles.

== Geography and economy ==
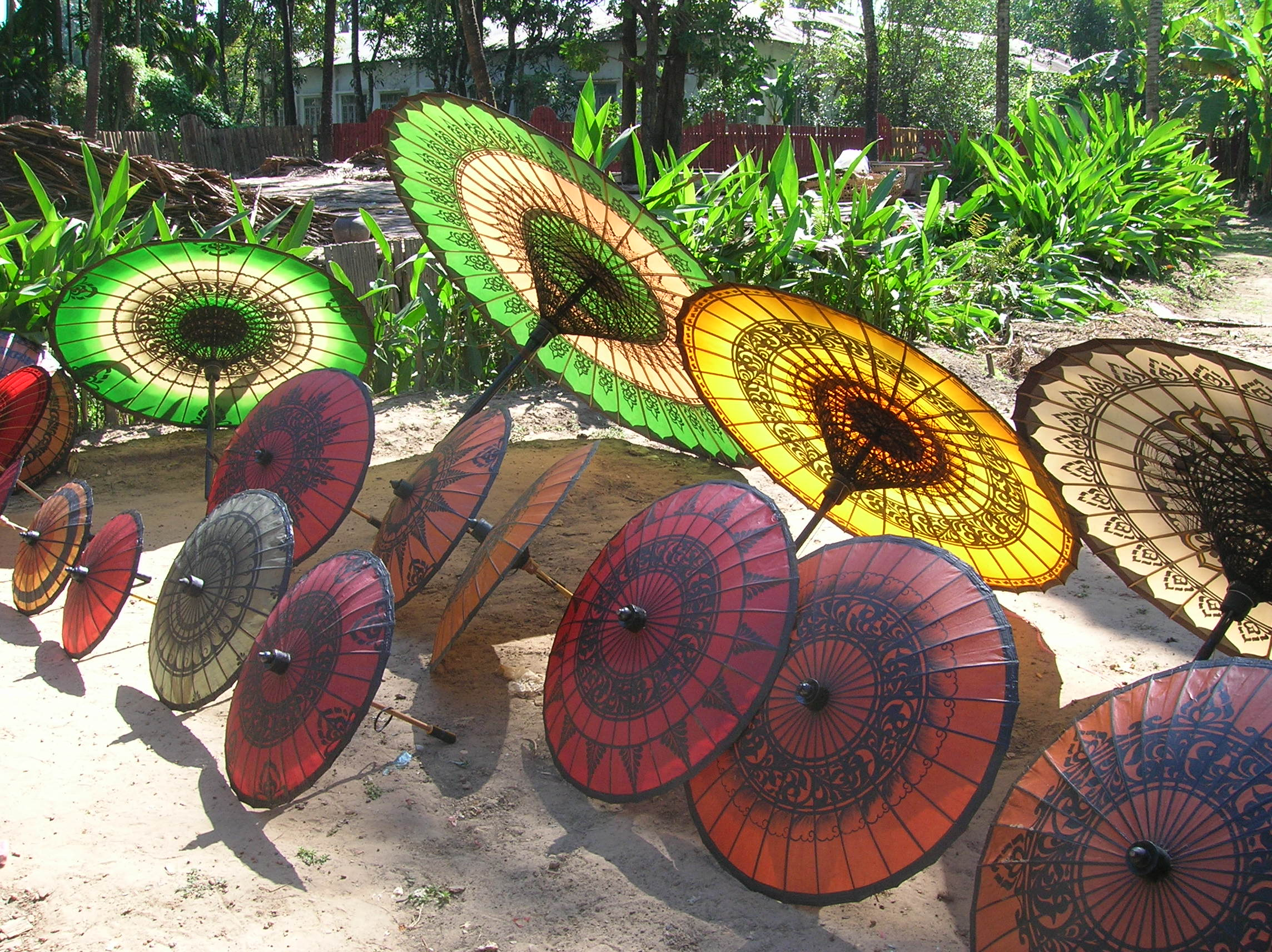
Locally made Pathein hti parasols

Lying at the western edge of the Ayeyarwady River delta, on the Pathein (Ngawan) River 118 miles (190 km) west of Yangon, Pathein is accessible to large vessels and despite its distance from the ocean, it is the most important delta port outside of Yangon. The city is also a terminus of a branch of the main railroad line which connects it to Hinthada, Letpadan and Yangon. In the 1990s, the road network along the Irrawaddy to Monywa was improved.

The coastline along the Bay of Bengal is surrounded by the Arakan Mountains. In the area is Inye Lake, 1.5 miles (2.4 km) long and 1 mile (1.6 km) wide, which is known for its fishing. There is also an offshore reef at Diamond Island that is popular with bathers. Diamond Island is also noted as a turtle breeding ground.

The city is a rice-milling and export centre. Aside from several rice mills, the town has numerous sawmills and umbrella workshops. The colourful handmade parasols made in Pathein are widely known throughout Burma. They are known locally as Pathein hti. Pathein is also known for its pottery and colourful hand-made baskets and buckets. Among Pathein's most prominent industries also include production of salt, mats, and Pathein halawa. The textiles produced in Pathein Industrial Zone is, however, the largest industry economy of the city. After textiles, the main industry is the various rice mills that process agricultural produce from nearby villages and towns.

The surrounding area outside Pathein are employed in agriculture and primarily cultivates rice. Other crops include sesames, groundnuts, jute, maize, pulse (legume)s, tobacco, chilies as well as a wide variety of fruits like banana and tamarind.

== Climate ==
Pathein has a tropical monsoon climate (Am) according to the Köppen climate classification system. Pathein experiences a sustained period of extraordinary rainfall from June through August. The dry season which runs from December through April, begins with noticeably cooler temperatures than the remainder of the year, but becomes sweltering as the wet season approaches in March and April.

Climate data for Pathein (1991–2020)
Month	Jan	Feb	Mar	Apr	May	Jun	Jul	Aug	Sep	Oct	Nov	Dec	Year
Record high °C (°F)	37.0 (98.6)	39.7 (103.5)	40.1 (104.2)	41.8 (107.2)	41.0 (105.8)	36.4 (97.5)	35.0 (95.0)	35.5 (95.9)	36.6 (97.9)	37.8 (100.0)	37.0 (98.6)	36.3 (97.3)	41.8 (107.2)
Mean daily maximum °C (°F)	32.1 (89.8)	34.1 (93.4)	35.9 (96.6)	36.9 (98.4)	34.5 (94.1)	31.1 (88.0)	30.4 (86.7)	30.0 (86.0)	31.1 (88.0)	32.5 (90.5)	33.0 (91.4)	31.9 (89.4)	32.8 (91.0)
Daily mean °C (°F)	24.9 (76.8)	26.6 (79.9)	28.8 (83.8)	30.6 (87.1)	29.8 (85.6)	27.7 (81.9)	27.1 (80.8)	26.8 (80.2)	27.3 (81.1)	28.1 (82.6)	27.4 (81.3)	25.4 (77.7)	27.5 (81.5)
Mean daily minimum °C (°F)	17.6 (63.7)	19.1 (66.4)	21.8 (71.2)	24.3 (75.7)	25.1 (77.2)	24.2 (75.6)	23.8 (74.8)	23.6 (74.5)	23.5 (74.3)	23.6 (74.5)	21.9 (71.4)	19.0 (66.2)	22.3 (72.1)
Record low °C (°F)	10.0 (50.0)	11.4 (52.5)	16.5 (61.7)	19.2 (66.6)	19.0 (66.2)	18.8 (65.8)	17.1 (62.8)	17.7 (63.9)	18.6 (65.5)	16.5 (61.7)	13.9 (57.0)	13.3 (55.9)	10.0 (50.0)
Average precipitation mm (inches)	3.8 (0.15)	7.5 (0.30)	10.2 (0.40)	30.4 (1.20)	276.0 (10.87)	604.5 (23.80)	682.7 (26.88)	681.3 (26.82)	416.7 (16.41)	204.2 (8.04)	65.9 (2.59)	3.5 (0.14)	2,986.9 (117.59)
Average precipitation days (≥ 1.0 mm)	0.3	0.2	0.7	1.7	12.6	24.8	26.2	25.9	22.0	14.2	4.0	0.3	132.8
Source 1: World Meteorological Organization
Source 2: NOAA (extremes)

== Demographics ==
=== 2014 ===
Historical Population
Year	Pop.	±%
1973		—
1983		—
2014	169,773	—
2019	172,923	+1.9%
Source: Ministry of Labor, Immigration, and Population and General Administration Department data

The 2014 Myanmar Census reported that Pathein had a population of 169,773, representing 59.1% of Pathein Township's total population. In 2019, the population was reported as 172,923. Pathein is subdivided into 25 urban wards

== Landmarks ==
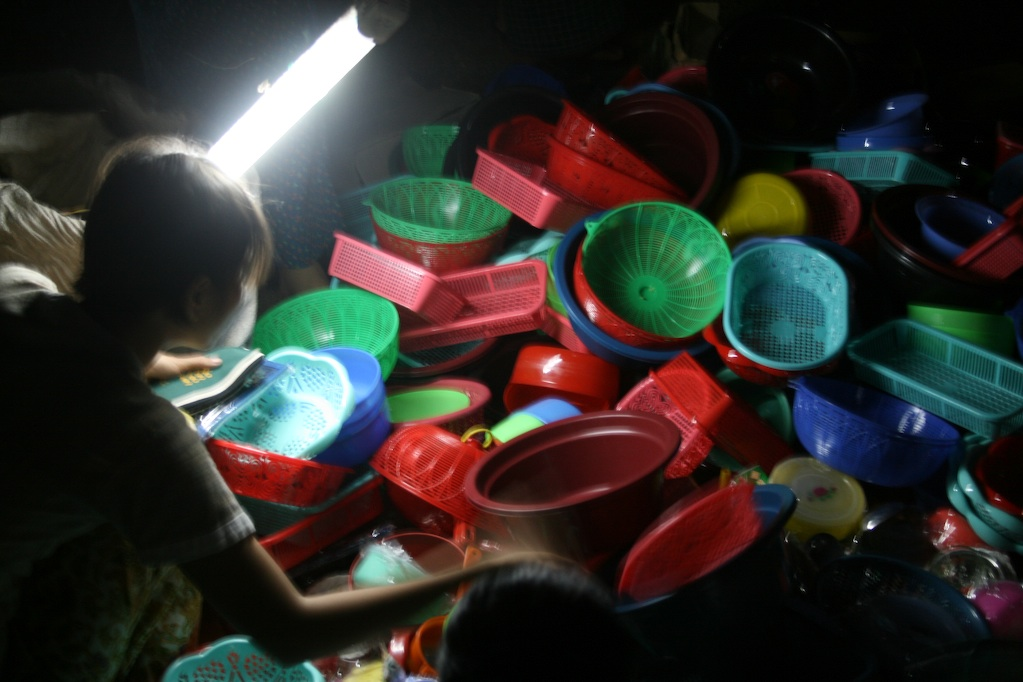
Locally-made buckets

Pathein has a scenic waterfront and many Buddhist temples, including the main sight of Shwemokhtaw Pagoda.

- Tagaung Mingala Pagoda
- Settawya pagoda
- Phaung Daw U Pagoda
- Clock Tower
- St Peter's Cathedral
- Pathein University
- Pathein Cultural Museum
- Pathein Bridge No.2

== Education ==
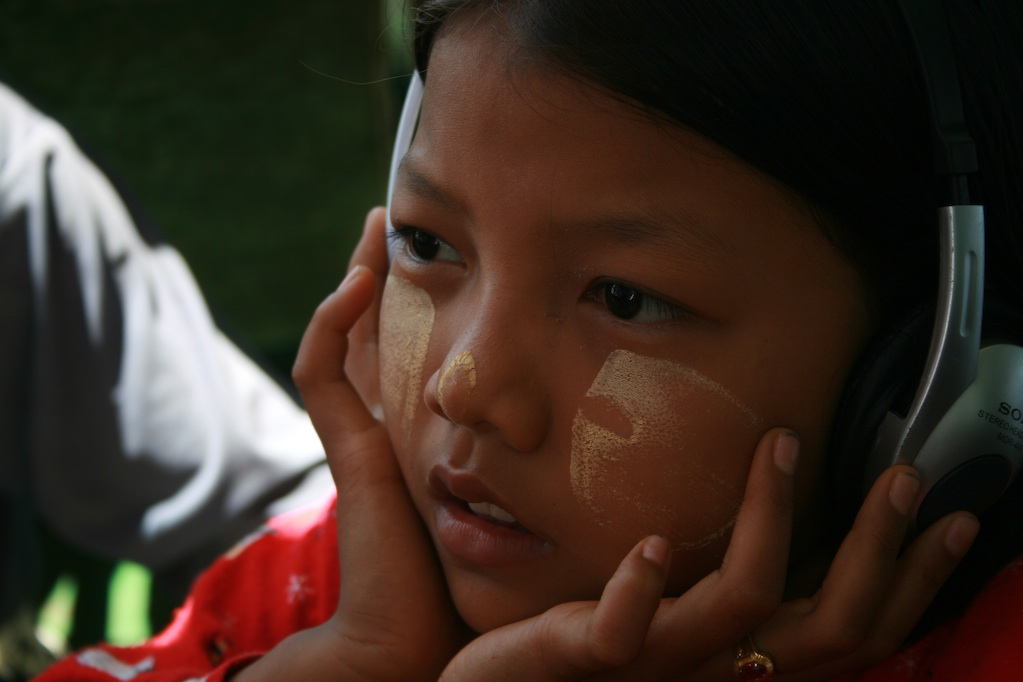
A local girl

The city is home to the Pathein Education College for elementary teachers and Pathein University for arts and science students. The Computer University (Pathein) which is administered by Ministry of Science and Technology offers both undergraduate and graduate programs in computer science, and computer technology. Technological University (Pathein) which was founded in 1999, offers engineering courses.

== Sports ==
The 6,000-seat Ayar Stadium is one of the main venues for popular local football tournaments. The stadium is the home of Ayeyawady United F.C., a Myanmar National League (MNL) football club.

== Health care ==
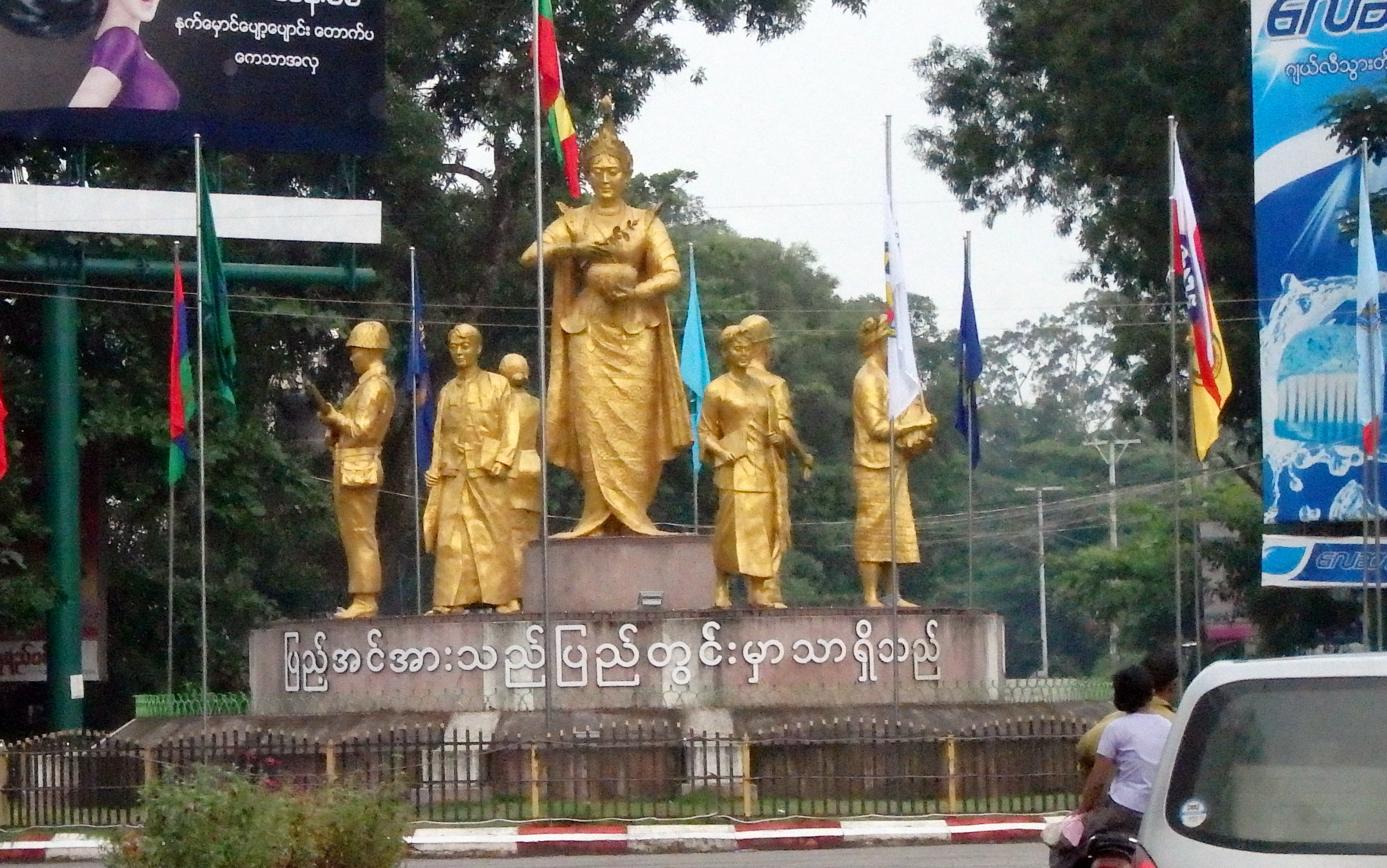
A roundabout in Pathein

Pathein General Hospital serves people in Pathein and its surrounding districts.

== Notable people ==
- Ba U, 1st Chief Justice of the Supreme Court of Burma and 2nd president of Myanmar (1952–1957) was born in Pathein in 1887.
- 8th president Thein Sein was born in a village nearby Hainggyikyun Subtownship in 1945 and studied his high school education in Pathein.
- 10th president Win Myint was born in Danubyu in 1945 and started his political life in Pathein, winning the Pathein Township seat within the Pyithu Hluttaw in a 2012 by-election.

== See also ==
- Pathein Airport
- Ngwesaung Beach
- Chaungtha Beach
