= Hainggyikyun Subtownship =

Subtownship in Myanmar

Hainggyikyun Subtownship ဟိုင်းကြီးကျွန်းမြို့နယ်ခွဲ
- Subtownship
- Location in Pathein district
- Coordinates: 16°02′N 94°20′E
- Country: Myanmar
- Region: Ayeyarwady Region
- District: Pathein District
- Township: Ngapudaw Township

Area
  - Total: 360.9 sq mi (934.8 km^{2})

Population (2014)
  - Total: 114,509
  - Density: 317.3/sq mi (122.5/km^{2})
- Time zone: UTC+6:30 (MMT)

Hainggyikyun Subtownship (Burmese: ဟိုင်းကြီးကျွန်းမြို့နယ်ခွဲ) is a subtownship of Ngapudaw Township in Pathein District, Ayeyarwady Region, Myanmar. The namesake of the subtownship is Hainggyikyun, a town of 14,771 people. The subtownship is coastal, bordering the Andaman Sea to its south and the Bay of Bengal to the west. To its north, it borders the rest of Ngapudaw Township and to its east Labutta Township. Cape Negrais, the southern end of the Arakan Mountains is located within the township.

== History ==
Former President Thein Sein was born in Kyounku, a small village that is, today, part of the subtownship.

The Pammawaddy Regional Command of the Myanmar Navy is headquartered in Hainggyi Island.

Cyclone Nargis, the deadliest tropical cyclone in the 21st century, made landfall at Cape Negrais within the township in 2008 with sustained winds of 130mph. In 2020, as many as 25% of affected residents where still recovering from the impact of the cyclone. There are still a few disaster awareness and preparedness programs for residents, with recovery and resilience efforts mostly coming from local efforts.

== Demographics ==
The median age within the township is 30 years and the mean household has 3.9 persons. There are 102 males for every 100 females within the township. The township was very underdeveloped in 2014 with only 0.9% of residents having a computer and 12% with a mobile phone.

Villages within the subtownship's eastern portion, located on a deltaic island, are not connected to Myanmar's national grid system. In the mid-2010s, due to rising energy demand and lack of infrastructure within the subtownship, solar and wind energy systems were installed within the subtownship to electrify remote rural villages.
