= Ngathaingchaung Subtownship =

Subtownship in Myanmar

Ngathaingchaung Subtownship ငသိုင်းချောင်းမြို့နယ်ခွဲ
- Subtownship
- Location in Kyonpyaw district
- Coordinates: 17.43°N 94.93°E
- Country: Myanmar
- Region: Ayeyawady Region
- District: Kyonpyaw District
- Township: Yekyi Township

Area
  - Total: 298.5 sq mi (773.2 km^{2})

Population (2014)
  - Total: 89,030
  - Density: 298.2/sq mi (115.1/km^{2})
- Time zone: UTC+6:30 (MMT)

Ngathaingchaung Subtownship (Burmese: ငသိုင်းချောင်းမြို့နယ်ခွဲ) is a subtownship of Yekyi Township in Kyonpyaw District, Ayeyarwady Region, Myanmar. It can also sometimes be referred to simply as Ngathaingchaung Township. The namesake of the subtownship is Ngathaingchaung, a town of 18,621 people. The subtownship is located partially on the Irrawaddy Delta and partially over the southern Arakan Mountains.

== Geography ==
Ngathaingchaung subtownship borders Gwa Township in Rakhine State to its west and contains the primary road into southern Rakhine. To its east, it borders the rest of Yekyi Township, with the boundary mostly following the Ngawun River. About 71,000 acres of land in the subtownship is dedicated forest preserve managed by the government. In 2024, rising water levels from heavy rain lead to two out of every three farm properties in the subtownship being flooded, with many villages submerged by high waters.

== Demographics ==
The subtownship is relatively rural with only 21.1% of the population living in the town of Ngathaingchaung itself. In 2014, the mean household size in the subtownship was 3.8 persons. The largest village outside of the town is Thaung Gyi with 5,613 people in 2014. Burmese folk religion is common in rural Ngathaingchaung subtownship, with U Shin Gyi being a venerated nat.

== Notable people ==
Historian Than Tun is a native of Ngathaingchaung Subtownship's Daunggyi village.
