= Yekyi =

Town in Ayeyarwady Region, Myanmar

Yekyi ရေကြည်မြို့
- Town
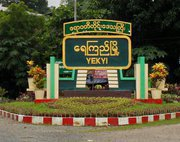
- Entrance sign of Yekyi

- Location within Myanmar
- Coordinates: 17°20′29″N 95°06′31″E
- Country: Myanmar
- State: Ayeyarwady Region
- District: Kyonpyaw District
- Township: Yekyi Township

Area
  - Total: 1.50 sq mi (3.9 km^{2})
- Elevation: 19 ft (5.8 m)

Population (2023)
  - Total: 11,263
  - Density: 7,510/sq mi (2,900/km^{2})
- Time zone: UTC+6.30 (MMT)

Yekyi (Burmese: ရေကြည်မြို့) is a town in the north-central Ayeyarwady Region, south-west Myanmar. It is the seat of the Yekyi Township in the Kyonpyaw District and is divided into 5 wards. The town sits on the southern bank of the Shwegu creek and curves with the meander of the creek.

Yekyi is on the Pathein-Monywa highway connecting towns west of the Irrawaddy River in the lowlying central Burmese basin. This location provides easy access for produce and goods to travel in and out of the town. However, according to a 2019 study, Yekyi was the least travelled destination for travellers from Pathein likely because the town only has one bus stop.
