= Kyaunggon =

Kyaunggon ကျောင်းကုန်း
- Town
- Location in Myanmar
- Coordinates: 17°6′N 95°11′E
- Country: Myanmar
- Region: Ayeyarwady Region
- District: Kyonpyaw District
- Township: Kyaunggon Township

Area
  - Total: 5.42 sq mi (14.0 km^{2})

Population (2019)
  - Total: 15,485
  - Density: 2,860/sq mi (1,100/km^{2})
- Time zone: UTC+6.30 (MMT)

Kyaunggon (Burmese: ကျောင်းကုန်း) is a town in the Ayeyarwady Region of south-west Myanmar. It is the seat of the Kyaunggon Township in the Pathein District.
