= Yegyi Township =

Township in Ayeyarwady Region, Myanmar

Yekyi Township ရေကြည်မြို့နယ်
- Township
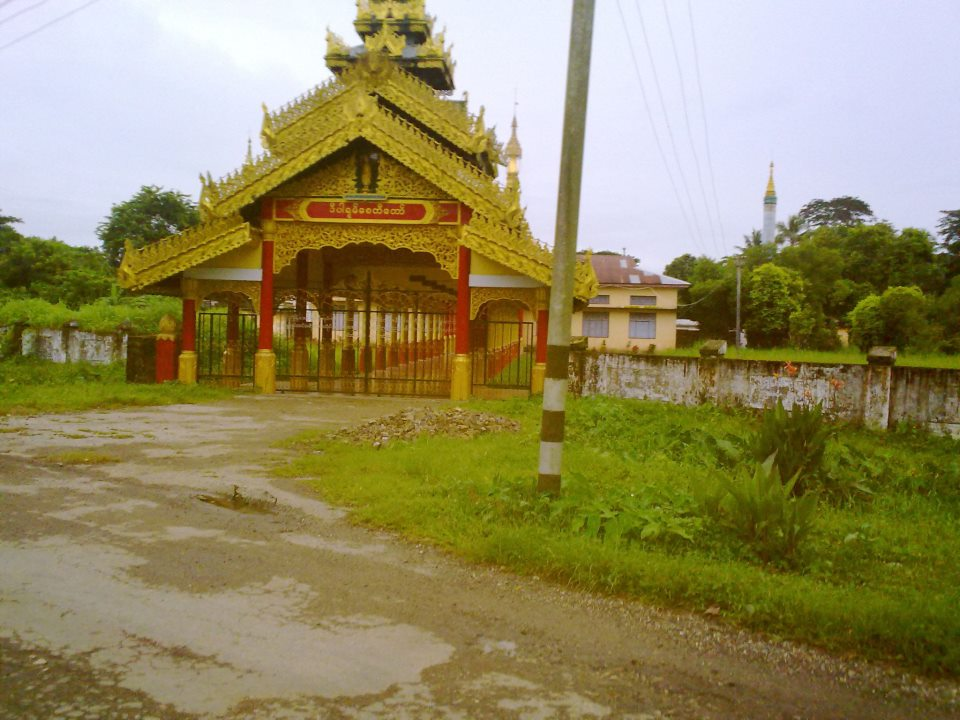
- Entrance to De Pa Yone Pagoda, Yekyi

- Location in Kyonpyaw district
- Coordinates: 17.344564°N 95.120672°E
- Country: Myanmar
- Region: Ayeyarwady Region
- District: Kyonpyaw District
- Capital: Yekyi

Area
  - Total: 488.51 sq mi (1,265.2 km^{2})
- Highest elevation: 2,546 ft (776 m)
- Lowest elevation: 23 ft (7 m)

Population (2023)
  - Total: 211,016
  - Density: 431.96/sq mi (166.78/km^{2})
  - Ethnicities: Bamar; Karen
  - Religions: Buddhism; Christianity
- Time zone: UTC+6:30 (MMT)

Yegyi Township (Burmese: ရေကြည်မြို့နယ်, officially romanized as Yekyi Township) is a township of Kyonpyaw District in north-central Ayeyarwady Region, Myanmar. The Township has three towns- the principal town of Yekyi and the towns of Ahthoke, Ngathaingchaung. The western portion of the township are informally includes Ngathaingchaung Subtownship, an unofficial division used by the Township for statistical and administrative ease. The township as a whole borders Lemyethna Township of Hinthada District to the north, Gwa Township of Rakhine State to the northwest and Thabaung Township of Pathein District to the southwest. To its east and southeast, it borders the other two townships of Kyonpyaw District, Kyonpyaw Township and Kyaunggon Township.

The township has 1 subtownship, 3 towns with 16 total urban wards and 87 village tracts representing 523 villages. Its largest town is Ngathaingchaung.

== Geography ==
Yegyi Township is located in the Irrawaddy Delta spanning to the peaks of the southern Arakan Mountains, which forms its northwestern border with Rakhine State. The township is divided between two geophysical region, the steep forested mountains in the west and the low-lying delta of the east. The Arakan Mountains run north-south on the township's western edge with mountain streams flowing eastwards towards the Ngawun River in the township's centre. The highest peak within the township is the tripoint between Rakhine State and Thabaung Township at an elevation of 1,060 feet (320 m).

The Ngawun forms most of the eastern dividing border of the Ngathaingchaung Subtownship, except in the north where the border turns east to encompass the town of Ngathaingchaung itself, which is located on the eastern bank of the Ngawun. The eastern portion of Yegyi township contains several streams, with Singu Creek (also known as the Yekyi Creek) being a major waterway connecting the town of Yekyi to the Daka River on the eastern edge of the town. The Daka forms most of the township's eastern border with Kyonpyaw Township. Riverbank erosion remains a safety risk for villages along the many waterways of the township.

The township has a variety of flora including valuable hardwoods like teak and pyinkadoe as well as other trees like Indian laurel, bamboo, mango and zanka trees. The township also locally cultivates medicinal pants including the ivy gourd and the bark of the thakhut tree. The township has 28.96% forest cover, with 22.63% of the township being state-maintained forest lands, with the largest reserve being the Kyetpaung Forest Reserve. These forest lands are home to fauna including forest goats, muntjacs, Asian golden cats, monkeys and pangolins. Beyond state-owned lands, the township also encourages private conservation efforts, including the planting of 250 acres of new hardwood forests in 2019.

== Economy and Demographics ==
Historical Population
Year	Yegyi Township	±%
1973		—
1983		—
2014	194,100*	—
2018	200,475	—
2019	202,210	+0.9%
2022	210,717	+4.2%
2023	211,016	+0.1%
*including Ngathaingchaung Subtownship; Source: Ministry of Labor, Immigration, and Population data, General Administration Department

The township is relatively rural with 76.0% of the population living outside the three towns. The majority religion is Buddhism with 97.4% of the population adhering to it. The second largest religion at 3,540 adherents is Christianity. Not counted in this statistic is 1,490 residents without a nation national ID card, including reportedly 772 Pakistani individuals, mostly in the town of Ahthoke. Between 2018 and 2019, the township saw 1,946 people immigrate into the township, mostly to the town of Yekyi. In 2014, the area of the township outside the Ngathaingchaung subtownship had a median age of 16.3 and a 95.1% literacy rate.

The township's primary industry is agriculture and has seen economic development in the 2010s. 68.7% of the Town's non-protected lands are used for agricultural activities, primarily producing rice and various types of legumes. Other agricultural products include bananas, betel nut and cassava. There is also a significant forestry industry, mostly managed by the government. Illegal teak products have been caught in the township, such as in 2013 when a shipment of teak doors were seized near Yekyi town.

The township contains the Gwa-Ngathaingchaung road, the main road to southern Rakhine state from Lower Myanmar. In late 2024, as the Arakan Army advanced south in the Rakhine offensive of the Myanmar civil war, military junta troops were stationed in the forest reserves to the township's west basing them out of small mountainside villages like Chaw Pyar and Thar Baung.

== Localities ==
- Aingzauk
- Kya Khat Hmyaung
- Ngathaingchaung
- Yekyi

== Gallery ==
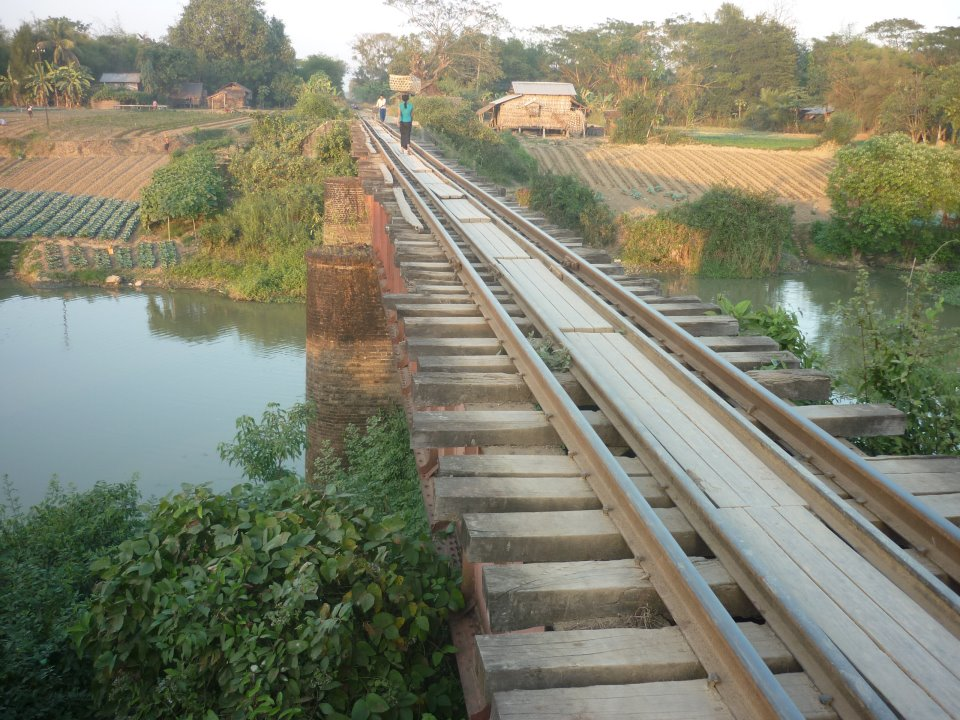
Railway in Yekyi Township

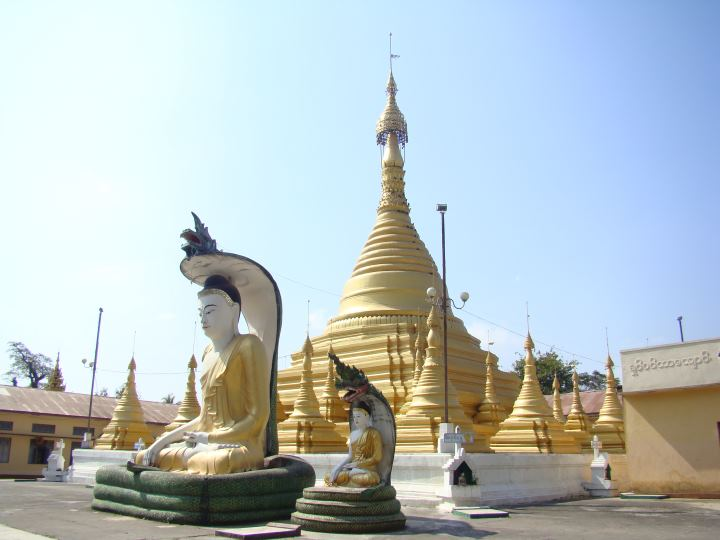
De Pa Yone Pagoda in Yekyi

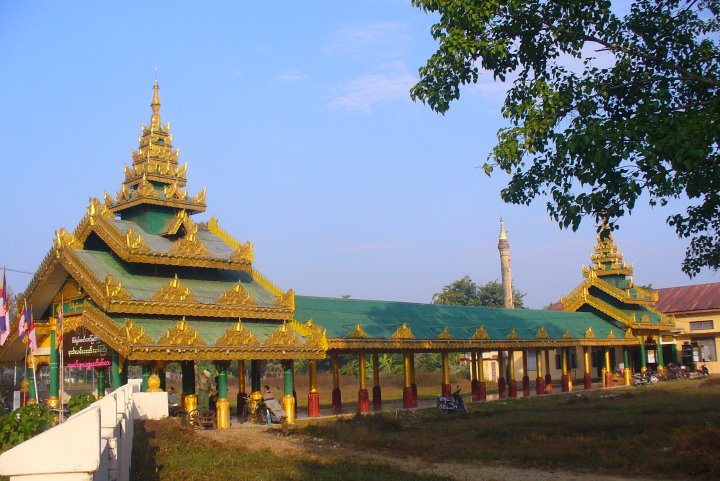
Entrance Walkway to De Pa Yone Pagoda

== See also ==
- List of villages in Yegyi Township
