= Kyaunggon Township =

Township in Ayeyawady Region, Myanmar

Kyaunggon Township Burmese: ကျောင်းကုန်းမြို့နယ်
- Township
- Location in Kyonpyaw district
- Coordinates: 17°6′N 95°11′E
- Country: Burma
- Region: Ayeyawady Region
- District: Kyonpyaw District
- Capital: Kyaunggon

Area
  - Total: 262.79 sq mi (680.6 km^{2})
- Elevation: 19.2 ft (5.9 m)

Population (2023)
  - Total: 177,417
  - Density: 675.13/sq mi (260.67/km^{2})
  - Ethnicities: Bamar; Karen
- Time zone: UTC+6:30 (MMT)

Kyaunggon Township (Burmese: ကျောင်းကုန်းမြို့နယ်) is a township of Kyonpyaw District in central Ayeyarwady Region of Myanmar.

Kyaunggon Township is located comprises the southern portion of Kyonpyaw District, bordering both Kyonpyaw Township and Yegyi Township to the north. To its west, Kyaunggon Township is bordered by Pathein District's Thabaung Township and Kangyidaunt Township. To the south it borders Einme Township of Myaungmya District and to its east it borders Pantanaw Township of Ma-ubin District. Kyaunggon Township is divided into 4 wards, 65 village tracts and 416 villages.

== Geography ==
Kyaunggon Township lies in a flat low-lying delta area, but has undulating topography "like waves going east to west". The township is located in a hot tropical zone with a heavy monsoon presence. Average highs and lows range between 38°C and 17°C, respectively. In 2019, the township saw 82 days of rain with an annual rainfall of 88.83 inches (225.6 cm). The flora of the township includes lebbek, mango, jackfruit, cassia, golden shower, tamarind, burmese plum, crepe-myrtle and cheesewood trees. There are no wild area or nature preserves in the township. The traditional medicinal plant pyi-nyan-pyo, used to treat diabetes and dysentary, is found in the township.

The Daka river runs through the central township north-south for 23 miles. It used to be the primary way to access the area and the nearby town of Kyonpyaw from Yangon. A few miles south of the town of Kyaunggon, the river splits to form the secondary waterway of the township, Minmanaing Creek, which runs for 11 miles due south.

== Demographics and Economy ==
Historical Population
Year	Kyaunggon Township	±%
2014	163,035	—
2018	167,815	+2.9%
2019	168,652	+0.5%
2022	178,521	+5.9%
2023	177,417	−0.6%
Source: Ministry of Labor, Immigration, and Population and General Administration Department data

Kyaunggon Township is very rural with 90.8% of the population in 2019 living outside of the only town Kyaunggon. The town has a significant Karen minority accounting for 33.9% of the population. The majority religion is Buddhism with 90.0% of the population adhering to it. The religion with the second most followers is Christianity with 8.9% of the population. The median age is 28.1 and the mean household size is 3.9 people. The township's literacy rate is 93.0% and only 7.1% of households use electricity as their primary means of lighting.

The main industry in Kyaunggon Township is agriculture with 124,489 acres of farmland. The primary crop is rice with black lentils and green peas as the primary cool season crop. Other notable agricultural products include pork, chicken, duck, sugarcane and peanuts. In 2019, the township's beef industry restarted after a three year period with no beef produced. The township has no dams or reservoirs and has a total of 75 combine harvesters and 16 rice processing plants. Two railways pass through the township, as well as the Yangon-Pathein Highway. Despite this, many still rely on the Daka river and other waterways as the primary means of transport for goods and people. The township has an issue with arsenic contamination, especially in well water. In 2020, researchers conducted education efforts regarding filtering water for arsenic in the township.

== See also ==
- List of villages in Kyaunggon Township
