= Kya Khat Hmyaung =

Village in Ayeyarwady Region, Myanmar

Coordinates: 17°17′21″N 94°56′07″E

Kya Khat Hmyaung is a village in Ma Gyi La Har Village Tract in Yegyi Township in the Pathein District of the Ayeyarwady Region in Myanmar.
