= Thabaung =

Thabaung သာပေါင်းမြို့
- Town
- Location in Myanmar
- Coordinates: 17°2′0″N 94°48′0″E
- Country: Myanmar
- Region: Ayeyarwady Region
- District: Pathein District
- Township: Thabaung Township

Area
  - Total: 0.93 sq mi (2.42 km^{2})

Population (2023)
  - Total: 6,726
  - Density: 7,200/sq mi (2,780/km^{2})
  - Ethnicities: Bamar; Karen
  - Religions: Buddhism
- Time zone: UTC+6.30 (MST)

Thabaung (Burmese: သာပေါင်းမြို့) is a town in the Ayeyarwady Region of south-west Myanmar. It is the seat of the Thabaung Township in the Pathein District. The Ngawun river runs through the town.
