= Thabaung Township =

Township in Ayeyarwady Region, Myanmar

Thabaung Township သာပေါင်းမြို့နယ်
- Township
- Location in Pathein district
- Coordinates: 17°2′N 94°48′E
- Country: Myanmar
- Region: Ayeyarwady Region
- District: Pathein District
- Capital: Thabaung

Area
  - Total: 776.95 sq mi (2,012.29 km^{2})
- Elevation: 18.8 ft (5.72 m)

Population (2023)
  - Total: 155,781
  - Density: 200.503/sq mi (77.4148/km^{2})
  - Ethnicities: Bamar; Karen
- Time zone: UTC+6:30 (MMT)

Thabaung Township is a township of Pathein District in the Ayeyarwady Region of Myanmar. The principal town is Thabaung.

Thabaung Township is located in west-central Ayeyarwady Region in the northern part of Pathein District. To the south, the township borders Pathein Township and Kangyidaunt Township with the district. To the townships's east it borders Yegyi Township and Kyaunggon Township in Kyonpyaw Township. In its northwest, it borders Gwa Township in Rakhine State. The Bay of Bengal forms the Township's western shore.

The township includes Shwethaungyan Subtownship, an unofficial division spanning the border with Pathein Township along the coast of the Bay of Bengal. The population in the area of Thabaung Township outside of the subtownship was 154,400 in 2014. The subtownship is used by the Townships for statistical and administrative ease. The township as a whole is divided into 3 urban wards, 67 village tracts and 394 villages.

== Geography ==
Thabaung Township is located in the Irrawaddy Delta spanning over the southern Arakan Mountains, which forms the dividing border defining Shwethaungyan Subtownship. The township is divided between three geophysical locations- the western coastline on the Bay of Bengal, the steep forested mountains in the west and the low-lying delta of the east.

The Ngawun River is the main river within the deltaic east, flowing from southwards past Thabaung towards Pathein. It serves as an important waterway for transportation. Thabaung Township is located in the upper delta where blackish water and coastal erosion are not present, but riverine flooding presents significant threat. The township sees a large and increasing amount of annual flooding, worsening from climate change. The frequency of flooding has also increased in recent years. The highest water levels registered range between 18 and 22 feet.

The highest peak within the township is the tripoint between Rakhine state and Yegyi Township at an elevation of 1,060 feet (320 m). The township lies in a mountainous tropical zone with a heavy monsoon presence, seeing 120 days of rain in an average year. Average highs and lows range between 36.8°C and 18.3°C with lows most in the mountains. Within just the eastern low-lying parts of the township, the average low is 24.0°C. The Setsayan Reserve and the Kyet-paung Reserved Forest lie within the township providing abundant biodiversity. The two reserves' land area within the township total 43.75 square miles (113.3 km^{2}). Ficus elastica, native rubber trees, are the namesake for the Kyetpaung reserve and differ from Brazilian Hevea brasiliensis trees used in plantation within the township. The two reserves also have endangered kanyaung trees. The township also has pyinkado, Indian laurel, rattan, mango, bur, Malabar plum, bamboo, gurjan and several varieties of jackfruit trees. The township also has many wild fauna from elephants, gaur, wild boars, hedgehogs, reticulated pythons, Burmese pythons, hawks, peacocks, cranes, parrots and myna birds.

== Economy and Demographics ==
Historical Population
Year	Thabaung Township	±%
1973		—
1983		—
2014	154,400*	—
2018	160,239	—
2019	159,575	−0.4%
2022	162,963	+2.1%
2023	155,781	−4.4%
*does not include Shwethaungyan Subtownship; Source: Ministry of Labor, Immigration, and Population data, General Administration Department

Thabaung Township is overwhelming rural with 95.5% of the population living outside the single town of Thabaung, which only has 7,120 people. The majority religion is Buddhism, which 82.45% of the population adhere to. The second most common religion is Christianity at 17.17% with only 0.4% adhering to other religions. There are 38,068 households with an average household size of 4.08 people.

In 2015, 18% of the population had mobile phones in the area of the township outside Shwethaungyan Subtownship, while the subtownship had a higher 30% ownership rate. The literacy rate across the township is 94% and the median age is 27.4 years

The primary industry of the township is agriculture and aquatic goods. 68.2% of the population worked in the agricultural or forestry industry. The primary crop, like with many in the region, is rice with pulses and green beans as rotation crops. While the township has a rubber reserve, the forestry industry mostly produces bamboo and charcoal, mostly for local consumer use.

The township generally has slow economic development, relying almost entirely on the Ngawun waterway to trade with Pathein. There are no railways, airports or major roads within the township. The area of Shwethaungyan subtownship within Thabaung township also lacks significant tourist beaches like those found a few miles south in Chaungtha, Pathein Township. Floods in the township also increasingly impact the economy by unexpected late floods ruining cultivation and high waves ruining fishing equipment. The rural communities within the township have structured responses to flooding in both official and unofficial forms. These organized responses rely on social responsibilities and charity to safely transport aid, food, healthcare and community members during floods as both an emergency response and as a social safety net.

== See also ==
- List of villages in Thabaung Township
