= Aingzauk =

- Location in Burma
- Coordinates: 17°21′0″N 94°58′0″E
- Country: Burma
- Division: Ayeyarwady Region
- Township: Yegyi Township

Population (2005)
  - Religions: Buddhism
- Time zone: UTC+6.30 (MST)

Aingzauk is a village in the Ayeyarwady Region of north-west Myanmar. It lies in Yegyi Township.

== See also ==
- List of cities, towns and villages in Burma: A
