= Ngathaingchaung =

Town in Ayeyarwady Region, Myanmar

Ngathaingchaung ငါးသိုင်းချောင်းမြို့
- Town
- Location in Myanmar
- Coordinates: 17.4000°N 95.0833°E
- Country: Myanmar
- Region: Ayeyarwady
- District: Pathein District
- Township: Yekyi Township
- Subtownship: Ngathaingchaung Subtownship

Area
  - Total: 2.98 sq mi (7.7 km^{2})

Population (2014)
  - Total: 20,018
  - Density: 6,720/sq mi (2,590/km^{2})
  - Religions: Buddhism; Hinduism; Islam
- Time zone: UTC+6:30 (MMT)

Ngathaingchaung or Ngathinechaung and sometimes Ngathainggyaung (Burmese: ငါးသိုင်းချောင်းမြို့) is a town and the second largest town in Yegyi Township, Kyonpyaw District in north-central Ayeyarwady Region, Myanmar and is divided into 6 urban wards. It is the namesake of Ngathaingchaung Subtownship, an informal division sued for statistical and administrative convenience. As such, it is the administrative seat for some local functions for 31 village tracts, which group together 196 of Yegyi Township's western half.

== Geography ==
Ngathaingchaung lies on the eastern bank of the Ngawun River in central Yekyi Township. The town's altitude is 36 feet (11 m) above sea level. It lies 78 kilometres (48 mi) from the region's and district's capital Pathein, 171 kilometres (106 mi)from Myanmar's largest city and former capital Yangon and 444 kilometres (276 mi) from Myanmar's current capital Naypyidaw.

== Demographics ==
In 2014, the town had a population of 18,743 people. The town saw little growth remaining at 18,971 people as of 2019. 95.6% of the township are Buddhists, with the second largest religion being 287 Hindus. In 2023, the town had 20,018 people.

== Climate ==
Climate data for Ngathaingchaung (1989–2010)
Month	Jan	Feb	Mar	Apr	May	Jun	Jul	Aug	Sep	Oct	Nov	Dec	Year
Mean daily maximum °C (°F)	31.6 (88.9)	34.0 (93.2)	36.7 (98.1)	36.7 (98.1)	35.0 (95.0)	31.2 (88.2)	30.5 (86.9)	30.2 (86.4)	31.3 (88.3)	32.6 (90.7)	32.3 (90.1)	30.9 (87.6)	32.8 (91.0)
Mean daily minimum °C (°F)	14.4 (57.9)	15.8 (60.4)	19.8 (67.6)	23.7 (74.7)	24.8 (76.6)	24.5 (76.1)	24.3 (75.7)	24.3 (75.7)	24.5 (76.1)	24.2 (75.6)	21.4 (70.5)	17.0 (62.6)	21.6 (70.9)
Average rainfall mm (inches)	1.3 (0.05)	2.3 (0.09)	4.8 (0.19)	25.6 (1.01)	232.5 (9.15)	517.2 (20.36)	607.2 (23.91)	572.8 (22.55)	328.7 (12.94)	161.8 (6.37)	22.0 (0.87)	4.5 (0.18)	2,480.7 (97.67)
Source: Norwegian Meteorological Institute
