= List of villages in Yegyi Township =

This is a list of villages in Yegyi Township, Pathein District, Ayeyarwady Region, Burma (Myanmar).

Village	Village code	Village tract	Coordinates (links to map & photo sources)	Notes
Si Son Kone	160479	Si Son Kone		
Kyein Chaung (North)	160480	Si Son Kone		
Kyein Chaung (South)	160481	Si Son Kone		
Kone Ka Lay	162547	Thin Gan Daunt		
Tha Yet Pin Hla	162544	Thin Gan Daunt		
None Ka Naing	162543	Thin Gan Daunt		
Than Din Chaung	162542	Thin Gan Daunt		
Thin Gan Daunt	162537	Thin Gan Daunt		
Ka Nyin Lay Pin	162540	Thin Gan Daunt		
Taung Su	162539	Thin Gan Daunt		
Nyaung Waing Su	162538	Thin Gan Daunt		
Nga Yant Chaung	162545	Thin Gan Daunt		
Thone Ein Tan	162541	Thin Gan Daunt		
Thin Gan Daunt (Upper)	162546	Thin Gan Daunt		
Kwin (Lel Su)	162548	Thin Gan Daunt		
Kyon Pa Doke	155881	Kyon Pa Doke		
Lel Di	155882	Kyon Pa Doke		
Ka Nyin Gwa	153371	Ka Nyin Gwa		
Pan Be Su	153372	Ka Nyin Gwa		
Tha Yet Kone	153373	Ka Nyin Gwa		
Ohn Pin Su	153374	Ka Nyin Gwa		
Pa Dauk Chaung	158905	Pa Dauk Chaung		
Shar Hpyu Kone	158906	Pa Dauk Chaung		
Tha Pyay Aing (1)	158907	Pa Dauk Chaung		
Tha Pyay Aing (2)	158908	Pa Dauk Chaung		
Ma Yin Saung	157347	Ma Yin Ku		
Ma Yin Ku	157346	Ma Yin Ku		
Zat Su	157348	Ma Yin Ku		
Ka Nyin Chaung	163896	Za Yat Hla		
Bu Tar Kone	163897	Za Yat Hla		
Set Kone	163895	Za Yat Hla		
Za Yat Hla	163894	Za Yat Hla		
Tha Khut Kone	155856	Kyon Ma Yan		
Kyon Ma Yan	155854	Kyon Ma Yan		
Kyon Kwe	155855	Kyon Ma Yan		
Dei Kone	161227	Taung La Har		
Kwin (Lel Su)	161228	Taung La Har		
Ah Shey Kone	158127	Nat Sin Ngu		
Yae Kyaw	158126	Nat Sin Ngu		
Zee Kone	158125	Nat Sin Ngu		
Ohn Pin Su	158124	Nat Sin Ngu		
Nat Sin Ngu	158122	Nat Sin Ngu		
Ah Nauk Kone	158123	Nat Sin Ngu		
Nyaung Ngu	153739	Kaing Ngu		
Kyaung Su	153743	Kaing Ngu		
Sa Lin Kone	153745	Kaing Ngu		
Thit Chauk Pin	153746	Kaing Ngu		
Zee Pin Inn	153744	Kaing Ngu		
Ah Nyar Tan	153741	Kaing Ngu		
Kyun Taw Kone	153742	Kaing Ngu		
Yoke Thay Kone	153740	Kaing Ngu		
Ah Shey Su	152220	Hnget Thaik		
Kho Taung (1)	152218	Hnget Thaik		
Kwet Thit	152219	Hnget Thaik		
Ah Lel Su	152221	Hnget Thaik		
Ah Nauk Su	152222	Hnget Thaik		
Kho Taung (2)	152223	Hnget Thaik		
Gon Nyin Tan	152224	Hnget Thaik		
Hlay Taw Yon	153038	Inn Hlyar Kone		
Sin Ku (West)	153040	Inn Hlyar Kone		
Lel Di	153039	Inn Hlyar Kone		
Sin Ku (East)	153041	Inn Hlyar Kone		
Inn Hlyar Kone	153037	Inn Hlyar Kone		
Yae Kyaw	162048	Than Din		
Than Din Gyi	162042	Than Din		
San Ni	162049	Than Din		
Laung Cho Kone	162045	Than Din		
Sit Kone	162044	Than Din		
Than Din Lay	162043	Than Din		
Maung Hla Yoe	162047	Than Din		
Kyaung Su	162046	Than Din		
Yan Myo Aung	155207	Kyar Kan		
Myauk Htoe Kwin	155211	Kyar Kan		
Kun Chan Kone Gyi	155210	Kyar Kan		
Za Yat Waing	155209	Kyar Kan		
Zaung Kyan Kone	155212	Kyar Kan		
Ohn Pin Su	155208	Kyar Kan		
Hpa Yar Gyi Kone	155206	Kyar Kan		
Kyar Kan	155205	Kyar Kan		
Ka Sun Yoe	163765	Yone Tone		
Yone Tone	163760	Yone Tone		
Ka Nyin Kwin	163766	Yone Tone		
Yone Tone Dwar Ya Su	163764	Yone Tone		
Myauk Htoe	163763	Yone Tone		
Kan Su	163762	Yone Tone		
Kyee Mi Chaung	163761	Yone Tone		
Kyun Kone Gyi	155102	Kyar Chaung		
Kyar Inn	155101	Kyar Chaung		
Kyar Chaung	155100	Kyar Chaung		
Tar Kone	155107	Kyar Chaung		
Ka Nyin Kwin	155105	Kyar Chaung		
Pay Kone Su	155103	Kyar Chaung		
Kwin Hlyar Saung	155104	Kyar Chaung		
Hmaw Thay	155106	Kyar Chaung		
Taung Lel	161229	Taung Lel		
Shwe Kyaung Kone	161231	Taung Lel		
Sa Lin Kone	161230	Taung Lel		
Thea Twin Kone	161233	Taung Lel		
Nat Win Kone	161232	Taung Lel		
Kyee Taw Aing	152919	Htut Pa Lut		
Kaing Ngu	152921	Htut Pa Lut		
Htut Pa Lut	152917	Htut Pa Lut		
Pyin Ka Doe Kone	152920	Htut Pa Lut		
Thin Taw Aing	152918	Htut Pa Lut		
Hpa Yar Kone	152359	Hpa Yar Kone		
Kwin Lel Su	152360	Hpa Yar Kone		
Kan Kone	152361	Hpa Yar Kone		
Thea Twin Kone	156429	Kywe Ta Lin		
Lel Di	156428	Kywe Ta Lin		
Sin Kwin	156424	Kywe Ta Lin		
Taw Su	156425	Kywe Ta Lin		
Sin Kone	156426	Kywe Ta Lin		
Nyaung Ngu	156427	Kywe Ta Lin		
Kywe Ta Lin	156423	Kywe Ta Lin		
Ah Shey Su	152403	Hpa Yar Ngu		
Hpa Yar Ngu	152399	Hpa Yar Ngu		
Kyaung Su	152400	Hpa Yar Ngu		
Ah Su Gyi	152401	Hpa Yar Ngu		
Taung Su	152405	Hpa Yar Ngu		
Ywar Thit	152402	Hpa Yar Ngu		
Tha Yet Oke	152404	Hpa Yar Ngu		
Kyar Inn (East)	161595	Tha Khut Kone		
Nyaung Kone	161591	Tha Khut Kone		
Hpa Yar Pu	161593	Tha Khut Kone		
Kyaung Su	161592	Tha Khut Kone		
Kyar Inn (West)	161594	Tha Khut Kone		
Ta Zaung Yoe	163207	Wet Yoke		
Wet Yoke	163202	Wet Yoke		
Ah Nauk Su	163203	Wet Yoke		
Ywar Thit Kone	163204	Wet Yoke		
Hpa Yar Ngoke To	163209	Wet Yoke		
Ka Nyin Ngu	163206	Wet Yoke		
Thit Poke	163208	Wet Yoke		
Oke Taik	163205	Wet Yoke		
Ywar Thit	163459	Yae Thoe		
Chin Kone	163458	Yae Thoe		
Nat Kone	163457	Yae Thoe		
Ywar Thit Kone	163460	Yae Thoe		
Gyoet Thar Pin Kone	163461	Yae Thoe		
Yae Thoe Lay	163456	Yae Thoe		
Yae Thoe Gyi	163454	Yae Thoe		
Let Pan Kone	163455	Yae Thoe		
Hlwe Paing	153811	Kan Chaung		
Kan U	153813	Kan Chaung		
Thin Gan Ngu	153812	Kan Chaung		
Kywe Ye	153814	Kan Chaung		
Kan Chaung	153810	Kan Chaung		
Gyo Kone	153815	Kan Chaung		
Sat Tha Hpu Kone	153816	Kan Chaung		
Kyaung Su	153817	Kan Chaung		
Ma Gyi Kone	153818	Kan Chaung		
Kyan Taw	153819	Kan Chaung		
Ah Lel Su	153820	Kan Chaung		
Kywe Ye Gyi	154734	Kun Thee Chaung		
Gyo Chaung	154733	Kun Thee Chaung		
Ah Nauk Ywar Thit	154732	Kun Thee Chaung		
Kyaung Su	154731	Kun Thee Chaung		
Ah Shey Ywar Thit	154730	Kun Thee Chaung		
Kun Thee Chaung	154729	Kun Thee Chaung		
Sat Tha Hpu Kone	154735	Kun Thee Chaung		
Pan Tin Kone	151121	Chaung Hpyar		
Gyo Chaung	151122	Chaung Hpyar		
Pan Chaung	151120	Chaung Hpyar		
Hpa Yar Ngoke To	151119	Chaung Hpyar		
Chaung Hpyar	151118	Chaung Hpyar		
Doe Tan	151123	Chaung Hpyar		
Kan Nar Su	152470	Hpet Tha Let		
Tha Yet Kone	152471	Hpet Tha Let		
Si Pin	152472	Hpet Tha Let		
Hpet Tha Let (Ah Shey Su)	152469	Hpet Tha Let		
Kyar Kwin	163055	War Yon La Har		
Thit Poke (South)	163057	War Yon La Har		
Thit Poke (North)	163054	War Yon La Har		
Kyaung Kone	163053	War Yon La Har		
Kaing Tar Gyi	163052	War Yon La Har		
Lel Di	163056	War Yon La Har		
Doe Kone	151541	Doe Kone		
Taw Tan Kone	151544	Doe Kone		
Ah Nauk Su	151543	Doe Kone		
Pauk Pin Kwin	151542	Doe Kone		
Kyar Inn Kone	158593	Nyaung Pin Thar		
Oke Shit Kone	158592	Nyaung Pin Thar		
Nyaung Pin Thar	158590	Nyaung Pin Thar		
Nyaung Pin Su	158591	Nyaung Pin Thar		
Kwin Lel Su	158595	Nyaung Pin Thar		
Ohn Ta Pin	158594	Nyaung Pin Thar		
Kya Khat Tan	154977	Kwin Thone Sint		
Ma Gyi Kone	154978	Kwin Thone Sint		
Kyar Inn	154976	Kwin Thone Sint		
Hnget Sat	154975	Kwin Thone Sint		
Tha Pyay Kwin	154973	Kwin Thone Sint		
Kone Tet	154972	Kwin Thone Sint		
U To	154971	Kwin Thone Sint		
Kwin Thone Sint	154970	Kwin Thone Sint		
Ta Zaung Yoe	154979	Kwin Thone Sint		
Taung Yar Gyi	154974	Kwin Thone Sint		
Hnget Pyaw Taw Kwin (North)	151450	Daunt Gyi Yoe Ma Dawt		
Hnget Pyaw Taw Kwin (South)	151446	Daunt Gyi Yoe Ma Dawt		
Pyin Ka Doe Kone	151447	Daunt Gyi Yoe Ma Dawt		
Htan Taw Gyi	151448	Daunt Gyi Yoe Ma Dawt		
Daunt Gyi	151444	Daunt Gyi Yoe Ma Dawt		
Hat Ma Soke Chaung	151449	Daunt Gyi Yoe Ma Dawt		
Kun Chan Kone	151445	Daunt Gyi Yoe Ma Dawt		
Nat Sin Kwin	158114	Nat Sin Kwin		
Shwe Nant Thar	158115	Nat Sin Kwin		
Thit Koke Ta Taung	162642	Thit Koke Ta Taung		
Me Kyet Ma Aing	162644	Thit Koke Ta Taung		
Thit Koke Ta Ah Lel Su	162643	Thit Koke Ta Taung		
Kyon Hpar (North)	155717	Kyon Hpar Yoe		
Kyon Hpar Taung Su	155713	Kyon Hpar Yoe		
Kyon Hpar (Ah Lel)	155716	Kyon Hpar Yoe		
Byaik Gyi	155714	Kyon Hpar Yoe		
Thit Ngoke Ta Htaung	155718	Kyon Hpar Yoe		
Mar Lar Kone	155715	Kyon Hpar Yoe		
Daunt Gyi Hpa Yar Kone	158521	Nyaung Ngu Let Khoke		
Daunt Gyi Yoe Taung Su	158524	Nyaung Ngu Let Khoke		
Kyun Taw Ka Lay	158522	Nyaung Ngu Let Khoke		
Nyaung Ngu Let Khoke	158520	Nyaung Ngu Let Khoke		
Ywar Thit	158523	Nyaung Ngu Let Khoke		
Auk Inn	161101	Taik Sun Auk Inn		
Taik Sun Auk Inn	161093	Taik Sun Auk Inn		
Tha Yet Taw	161097	Taik Sun Auk Inn		
Nyaung Kone	161094	Taik Sun Auk Inn		
Htaw Thwei (Mar Lar Kone)	161096	Taik Sun Auk Inn		
Let Pan Su	161095	Taik Sun Auk Inn		
Hat Min Soke Chaung	161099	Taik Sun Auk Inn		
Sar Hpyu Su	161100	Taik Sun Auk Inn		
Thea Kone	161098	Taik Sun Auk Inn		
Hpan Khar Kone	152605	Htan Kyun Seik Thar		
Shaw Hpyu Chaung	152606	Htan Kyun Seik Thar		
Nyaung Thone Pin	152604	Htan Kyun Seik Thar		
Seik Thar	152603	Htan Kyun Seik Thar		
Htan Kyun	152599	Htan Kyun Seik Thar		
Ah Su Gyi	152600	Htan Kyun Seik Thar		
Kan Su	152601	Htan Kyun Seik Thar		
Sar Kyet Kone	152602	Htan Kyun Seik Thar		
Ku Lar Kone	161897	Tha Yet Kone		
Ma Gyi Ngu	161895	Tha Yet Kone		
Kywe Nwe Kone	161894	Tha Yet Kone		
Tha Yet Kone	161893	Tha Yet Kone		
Htan Thone Pin	161896	Tha Yet Kone		
Wet Lar	163182	Wet Lar		
Zee Ngu	163183	Wet Lar		
Yoe Da Yar Det	163689	Yoe Da Yar Det		
Kone Ka Lay	163690	Yoe Da Yar Det		
Pan Taw Yoe	163693	Yoe Da Yar Det		
Bant Bway Kone	163692	Yoe Da Yar Det		
Thar Yar Kone	163691	Yoe Da Yar Det		
Ohn Taw Su	153722	Kaing Chaung		
Ah Nyar Tan	153721	Kaing Chaung		
Ta Man Gyi	153720	Kaing Chaung		
Kyaung Su	153719	Kaing Chaung		
Ah Yoe Taung	153723	Kaing Chaung		
Kaing Chaung	153718	Kaing Chaung		
Daunt Gyi Yoe	159961	Sat Kwin		
Sat Kwin	159953	Sat Kwin		
Kyon Hpar	159954	Sat Kwin		
Ywar Thit	159955	Sat Kwin		
Ta Man Gyi	159956	Sat Kwin		
Kyee Ga Yet	159957	Sat Kwin		
Kan Ka Lay	159958	Sat Kwin		
Thone Gwa	159960	Sat Kwin		
Thit Win Kone	159962	Sat Kwin		
Thit Seint Kone	159963	Sat Kwin		
Si Gwa Kyun Taw	159959	Sat Kwin		
Kan Nar Daik Hlyar	158387	Nwar Yae Taik		
Nwar Yae Taik	158382	Nwar Yae Taik		
Kone Su	158383	Nwar Yae Taik		
War Te Su	158384	Nwar Yae Taik		
Kone Daik Hlyar	158386	Nwar Yae Taik		
Ohn Pin Su	158388	Nwar Yae Taik		
Daik Hlyar	158385	Nwar Yae Taik		
Tha Pyay Khar Taw	150120	Ah Kei		
Ah Kei Gyi Gyo Kone	150119	Ah Kei		
Kyun Tauk	152146	Hnaw Kone		
Kyein Chaung	152145	Hnaw Kone		
Dwar Ya Su	152144	Hnaw Kone		
Hnaw Kone	152143	Hnaw Kone		
Tar Kyoe	157123	Ma Gyi La Har		
Nyaung Pin Su	157122	Ma Gyi La Har		
Ma Gyi La Har	157120	Ma Gyi La Har		
Ywar Thit Kone	157125	Ma Gyi La Har		
Kwin Lel Su	157126	Ma Gyi La Har		
Kwin Gyi	157127	Ma Gyi La Har		
Tin Koke Gyi	157128	Ma Gyi La Har		
Tar Nar Su	157121	Ma Gyi La Har		
Kya Khat Hmyaung	157124	Ma Gyi La Har		
Ah Nyar Tan	157129	Ma Gyi La Har		
Htan Ngar Pin	157131	Ma Gyi La Har		
Auk Su	157130	Ma Gyi La Har		
Ohn Ta Pin	154825	Kwin Gyi		
Sit Ta Pin	154826	Kwin Gyi		
Yae Paw Kone	154827	Kwin Gyi		
Pan Zan Kwin	159126	Pan Zan Kwin		
Nyaung Pin Gyi Su	159130	Pan Zan Kwin		
Tha Min Chan (East)	159129	Pan Zan Kwin		
Koke Ko Taw	159127	Pan Zan Kwin		
Tha Min Chan (West)	159128	Pan Zan Kwin		
Ah Nyar Tan	150968	Bweit Ngu		
Bweit Ngu Tar Kwin	150963	Bweit Ngu		
Bweit Ngu Tar Pyin	150964	Bweit Ngu		
Ywar Thit	150965	Bweit Ngu		
Nga Pi Seik	150966	Bweit Ngu		
Nyaungdon	150967	Bweit Ngu		
Ka Nyin Ngu	153456	Ka Nyin Ngu		
Taw Lay	153457	Ka Nyin Ngu		
Htan Pin Kyoe	153458	Ka Nyin Ngu		
Yin Shwe	163653	Yin Shwe		
Tha Pyay Tan	163654	Yin Shwe		
Kwin Pauk	162640	Thit Hpyu Pin		
Thit Hpyu Pin	162639	Thit Hpyu Pin		
Hpan Khar Kone	162641	Thit Hpyu Pin		
Ohn Taw Paing	150337	Ah Thoke		
Kyun Taw	150340	Ah Thoke		
Myo Yoe Kan Nar Tan	150345	Ah Thoke		
Daunt Gyi Yoe	150344	Ah Thoke		
Taw Nar Su	150343	Ah Thoke		
Daunt Gyi	150341	Ah Thoke		
Wet Kyar Yoe	150342	Ah Thoke		
Lan Ma Taw	150334	Ah Thoke		
Aung Zay Ya	150335	Ah Thoke		
Ma Gyi Tan	150338	Ah Thoke		
Shwe Gon Tan	150336	Ah Thoke		
Gya Pan Kone	150339	Ah Thoke		
Mei Za Li Kone	157865	Myet To (Ngathaingchaung Sub-township)		
Hnget Gyi Thaik	157866	Myet To (Ngathaingchaung Sub-township)		
Hlay Swea Yoe	157867	Myet To (Ngathaingchaung Sub-township)		
Kya Khat Tan	154519	Kone Pyin (Ngathaingchaung Sub-township)		
Yae Nauk	154522	Kone Pyin (Ngathaingchaung Sub-township)		
Yae Thoe	154516	Kone Pyin (Ngathaingchaung Sub-township)		
Kyaung Kwin	154520	Kone Pyin (Ngathaingchaung Sub-township)		
Thi Dar	154521	Kone Pyin (Ngathaingchaung Sub-township)		
Tha Pyay Kwin	154518	Kone Pyin (Ngathaingchaung Sub-township)		
Ma Dawt Hmyaung	154517	Kone Pyin (Ngathaingchaung Sub-township)		
Sin Oe Kwe	157567	Meik Tha Lin (Ngathaingchaung Sub-township)		
Da Yei Kone	157569	Meik Tha Lin (Ngathaingchaung Sub-township)		
Tha Yet Kone	157570	Meik Tha Lin (Ngathaingchaung Sub-township)		
Sin Thay	157568	Meik Tha Lin (Ngathaingchaung Sub-township)		
Thaik Tu Kone	157566	Meik Tha Lin (Ngathaingchaung Sub-township)		
Ah Lel San	151779	Gway Tauk (Ngathaingchaung Sub-township)		
Hmyawt Htu	151782	Gway Tauk (Ngathaingchaung Sub-township)		
Yae San	151780	Gway Tauk (Ngathaingchaung Sub-township)		
Myauk San	151777	Gway Tauk (Ngathaingchaung Sub-township)		
Kyaung Kone	151781	Gway Tauk (Ngathaingchaung Sub-township)		
Taung Kone Sa Khan	151774	Gway Tauk (Ngathaingchaung Sub-township)		
Inn Gyi Let	151783	Gway Tauk (Ngathaingchaung Sub-township)		
Peik Shey	151776	Gway Tauk (Ngathaingchaung Sub-township)		
Taung San	151778	Gway Tauk (Ngathaingchaung Sub-township)		
Kyauk Khea Chaung	151775	Gway Tauk (Ngathaingchaung Sub-township)		
Taung Hnit Lone	151784	Gway Tauk (Ngathaingchaung Sub-township)		
Kun Chan Kone	151773	Gway Tauk (Ngathaingchaung Sub-township)		
Pyin Koe Pin	162225	Thaung Gyi (Ngathaingchaung Sub-township)		
Chaung Wa	162224	Thaung Gyi (Ngathaingchaung Sub-township)		
Tet Seik	162223	Thaung Gyi (Ngathaingchaung Sub-township)		
War Tha La	162222	Thaung Gyi (Ngathaingchaung Sub-township)		
Thaung Gyi	162220	Thaung Gyi (Ngathaingchaung Sub-township)		
Yae Le	162221	Thaung Gyi (Ngathaingchaung Sub-township)		
Myit Se	157942	Myit Se (Ngathaingchaung Sub-township)		
Inn Hylar	157943	Myit Se (Ngathaingchaung Sub-township)		
Ywar Thit Kone	157944	Myit Se (Ngathaingchaung Sub-township)		
Myit Kyoe	157038	Ma Au Kone (Ngathaingchaung Sub-township)		
Kyon Tar	157037	Ma Au Kone (Ngathaingchaung Sub-township)		
Daunt Hman Kone	157034	Ma Au Kone (Ngathaingchaung Sub-township)		
Ma Yin Kone	157035	Ma Au Kone (Ngathaingchaung Sub-township)		
Ma Au Kone	157030	Ma Au Kone (Ngathaingchaung Sub-township)		
San Pya	157032	Ma Au Kone (Ngathaingchaung Sub-township)		
Thaung Su Gyi	157033	Ma Au Kone (Ngathaingchaung Sub-township)		
Kone Su	157031	Ma Au Kone (Ngathaingchaung Sub-township)		
Kyaung Su	157036	Ma Au Kone (Ngathaingchaung Sub-township)		
Daunt Gyi Bet	151440	Daunt Gyi Bet (Ngathaingchaung Sub-township)		
Tar Lay Paing	151441	Daunt Gyi Bet (Ngathaingchaung Sub-township)		
Shwe Kyaung Waing	151442	Daunt Gyi Bet (Ngathaingchaung Sub-township)		
Tha Yet Chaung (Ah Htet Su)	151443	Daunt Gyi Bet (Ngathaingchaung Sub-township)		
Thaung	161857	Tha Yet Chaung (Ngathaingchaung Sub-township)		
Taung Hway Htauk	161859	Tha Yet Chaung (Ngathaingchaung Sub-township)		
Pauk Taw	161858	Tha Yet Chaung (Ngathaingchaung Sub-township)		
Tha Yet Chaung	161856	Tha Yet Chaung (Ngathaingchaung Sub-township)		
Lu Pone Kwin	154811	Kwin Chaung (Ngathaingchaung Sub-township)		
Kya Khat Kwin	154810	Kwin Chaung (Ngathaingchaung Sub-township)		
Taung Ka Lay	154809	Kwin Chaung (Ngathaingchaung Sub-township)		
Kwin Chaung	154808	Kwin Chaung (Ngathaingchaung Sub-township)		
Auk Su	152438	Hpan Khar Pin (Ngathaingchaung Sub-township)		
Ah Nauk Ga Yet	152437	Hpan Khar Pin (Ngathaingchaung Sub-township)		
Ah Shey Ga Yet	152436	Hpan Khar Pin (Ngathaingchaung Sub-township)		
Hpan Khar Kwin	152435	Hpan Khar Pin (Ngathaingchaung Sub-township)		
Hpan Khar Pin	152434	Hpan Khar Pin (Ngathaingchaung Sub-township)		
Nyaung Pin Thar	158596	Nyaung Pin Thar (Ngathaingchaung Sub-township)		
Taung Chaung	158597	Nyaung Pin Thar (Ngathaingchaung Sub-township)		
Let Pan Su	158598	Nyaung Pin Thar (Ngathaingchaung Sub-township)		
U Yin	154867	Kwin Gyi Tha Bawt (Ngathaingchaung Sub-township)		
Ma Tawt	154866	Kwin Gyi Tha Bawt (Ngathaingchaung Sub-township)		
Than Lwin	154865	Kwin Gyi Tha Bawt (Ngathaingchaung Sub-township)		
Tha Pyay Kwin	154864	Kwin Gyi Tha Bawt (Ngathaingchaung Sub-township)		
Kwin Gyi	154863	Kwin Gyi Tha Bawt (Ngathaingchaung Sub-township)		
Tha Bawt	154868	Kwin Gyi Tha Bawt (Ngathaingchaung Sub-township)		
Kwin Pauk	154889	Kwin Hlyar (Ngathaingchaung Sub-township)		
Ah Tat Kwin	154886	Kwin Hlyar (Ngathaingchaung Sub-township)		
Sar Taw	154890	Kwin Hlyar (Ngathaingchaung Sub-township)		
Kwin Hlyar Bet	154892	Kwin Hlyar (Ngathaingchaung Sub-township)		
Aing Zauk	154893	Kwin Hlyar (Ngathaingchaung Sub-township)		
Ngar Yar Kyaw	154888	Kwin Hlyar (Ngathaingchaung Sub-township)		
Lay Se Kyaw	154887	Kwin Hlyar (Ngathaingchaung Sub-township)		
Ah Kei Gyi	154884	Kwin Hlyar (Ngathaingchaung Sub-township)		
Ywar Thit Kone	154885	Kwin Hlyar (Ngathaingchaung Sub-township)		
Ohn Pin Su	154891	Kwin Hlyar (Ngathaingchaung Sub-township)		
Hpa Yar Kone	152362	Hpa Yar Kone (Ngathaingchaung Sub-township)		
Ah Lel Su	153941	Kan Ni (Ngathaingchaung Sub-township)		
Kan Ni	153938	Kan Ni (Ngathaingchaung Sub-township)		
Kyet Paung	153942	Kan Ni (Ngathaingchaung Sub-township)		
Nyaung Pin Tan	153943	Kan Ni (Ngathaingchaung Sub-township)		
Ma Au Kone	153940	Kan Ni (Ngathaingchaung Sub-township)		
Kyon Tone	153939	Kan Ni (Ngathaingchaung Sub-township)		
Thit Nat San	163563	Yae Yin (Ngathaingchaung Sub-township)		
Hpa Lan	163566	Yae Yin (Ngathaingchaung Sub-township)		
Pyant Thay	163564	Yae Yin (Ngathaingchaung Sub-township)		
Yae Yin	163562	Yae Yin (Ngathaingchaung Sub-township)		
Thea Kone	163565	Yae Yin (Ngathaingchaung Sub-township)		
Ka Nyin Taung	154948	Kwin Pauk (Ngathaingchaung Sub-township)		
Kwin Pauk	154946	Kwin Pauk (Ngathaingchaung Sub-township)		
Kayin Kwin Pauk	154947	Kwin Pauk (Ngathaingchaung Sub-township)		
Kyauk Gyi Kwin	155603	Kyoet Kone (Ngathaingchaung Sub-township)		
Kyoet Kone (North)	155602	Kyoet Kone (Ngathaingchaung Sub-township)		
Chin Kwin	151236	Chin Kwin (Ngathaingchaung Sub-township)		
Yone Pin	151237	Chin Kwin (Ngathaingchaung Sub-township)		
Boe Taw	158444	Nyaung Hmaw (Ngathaingchaung Sub-township)		
Kan Bar Gyi	158445	Nyaung Hmaw (Ngathaingchaung Sub-township)		
Taung Nyo	158448	Nyaung Hmaw (Ngathaingchaung Sub-township)		
Taung Tan	158449	Nyaung Hmaw (Ngathaingchaung Sub-township)		
Dat Taw Kone	158450	Nyaung Hmaw (Ngathaingchaung Sub-township)		
Yae Le Gyi	158451	Nyaung Hmaw (Ngathaingchaung Sub-township)		
Kyauk Gyi Kwin	158452	Nyaung Hmaw (Ngathaingchaung Sub-township)		
Ywar Thit Ka Lay	158446	Nyaung Hmaw (Ngathaingchaung Sub-township)		
Ah Lel Kyun	158447	Nyaung Hmaw (Ngathaingchaung Sub-township)		
Nyaung Hmaw	158443	Nyaung Hmaw (Ngathaingchaung Sub-township)		
Ta Yaw Kone	154071	Kat Ku Gyi (Ngathaingchaung Sub-township)		
Ma Gyi Pin Su	154075	Kat Ku Gyi (Ngathaingchaung Sub-township)		
Set Set Yo	154069	Kat Ku Gyi (Ngathaingchaung Sub-township)		
Ah Lel Su	154070	Kat Ku Gyi (Ngathaingchaung Sub-township)		
Yae Hpyu	154073	Kat Ku Gyi (Ngathaingchaung Sub-township)		
Thit Seint Kone	154074	Kat Ku Gyi (Ngathaingchaung Sub-township)		
Kyaung Su	154079	Kat Ku Gyi (Ngathaingchaung Sub-township)		
Te Gyi Su	154078	Kat Ku Gyi (Ngathaingchaung Sub-township)		
Kone Gyi	154077	Kat Ku Gyi (Ngathaingchaung Sub-township)		
San Di Hmyaung	154076	Kat Ku Gyi (Ngathaingchaung Sub-township)		
Lun Kone	154072	Kat Ku Gyi (Ngathaingchaung Sub-township)		
Yae Thoe Kone	154085	Kat Ku Lay (Ngathaingchaung Sub-township)		
Ku Lel Kone	154084	Kat Ku Lay (Ngathaingchaung Sub-township)		
Sint Ku	154083	Kat Ku Lay (Ngathaingchaung Sub-township)		
Nga Pi Hlan	154082	Kat Ku Lay (Ngathaingchaung Sub-township)		
Kone Ka Lay	154081	Kat Ku Lay (Ngathaingchaung Sub-township)		
Kat Ku Lay	154080	Kat Ku Lay (Ngathaingchaung Sub-township)		
Ya Thar Lay	156903	Let Pan Pin (Ngathaingchaung Sub-township)		
U Yin Su	156906	Let Pan Pin (Ngathaingchaung Sub-township)		
Tha Bawt Kone	156904	Let Pan Pin (Ngathaingchaung Sub-township)		
Ya Thar Gyi	156902	Let Pan Pin (Ngathaingchaung Sub-township)		
Yoke Thay Tan	156901	Let Pan Pin (Ngathaingchaung Sub-township)		
Kyat Kone	156900	Let Pan Pin (Ngathaingchaung Sub-township)		
Tha Pyay Kwin	156899	Let Pan Pin (Ngathaingchaung Sub-township)		
Yae Nauk	156905	Let Pan Pin (Ngathaingchaung Sub-township)		
Tha Pyu Pin	155306	Kyauk Chaung (Ngathaingchaung Sub-township)		
Nyaung Pin Gyi Su	155305	Kyauk Chaung (Ngathaingchaung Sub-township)		
Tha Pyay Kwin	155304	Kyauk Chaung (Ngathaingchaung Sub-township)		
Pyin Koe Pin	155302	Kyauk Chaung (Ngathaingchaung Sub-township)		
Kan Kone	155301	Kyauk Chaung (Ngathaingchaung Sub-township)		
Yae Nant Thar	155300	Kyauk Chaung (Ngathaingchaung Sub-township)		
Let Pan Chaung	155299	Kyauk Chaung (Ngathaingchaung Sub-township)		
Kyaung Kwin	155303	Kyauk Chaung (Ngathaingchaung Sub-township)		
Ma Gyi Kone	162469	Thet Kei Pyin (Ngathaingchaung Sub-township)		
Shwe Laung Kyin	162464	Thet Kei Pyin (Ngathaingchaung Sub-township)		
Sin Ka Ni Khon	162465	Thet Kei Pyin (Ngathaingchaung Sub-township)		
Hpet Set Let	162466	Thet Kei Pyin (Ngathaingchaung Sub-township)		
Kwin Ka Lay	162467	Thet Kei Pyin (Ngathaingchaung Sub-township)		
Nyaung Waing	162468	Thet Kei Pyin (Ngathaingchaung Sub-township)		
Gway Pin Daunt	163852	Ywar Thit Gyi (Ngathaingchaung Sub-township)		
Kayin Taw Gyi	163853	Ywar Thit Gyi (Ngathaingchaung Sub-township)		
Sa Lu Taung	163854	Ywar Thit Gyi (Ngathaingchaung Sub-township)		
Kyun Tone	163855	Ywar Thit Gyi (Ngathaingchaung Sub-township)		
That Ti Kone	163856	Ywar Thit Gyi (Ngathaingchaung Sub-township)		
Nyaung Waing	163857	Ywar Thit Gyi (Ngathaingchaung Sub-township)		
Hle Lan Ku	163862	Ywar Thit Gyi (Ngathaingchaung Sub-township)		
Yae Nauk	163863	Ywar Thit Gyi (Ngathaingchaung Sub-township)		
War So Chaung	163858	Ywar Thit Gyi (Ngathaingchaung Sub-township)		
Shan Su	163859	Ywar Thit Gyi (Ngathaingchaung Sub-township)		
Ywar Thit Ka Lay	163860	Ywar Thit Gyi (Ngathaingchaung Sub-township)		
Chin Chaung	163861	Ywar Thit Gyi (Ngathaingchaung Sub-township)		
Thit Poke Kone	163864	Ywar Thit Gyi (Ngathaingchaung Sub-township)		
Tha Yet Pin Gyi Su	159078	Pan Pu Kwin (Ngathaingchaung Sub-township)		
Si Son	159077	Pan Pu Kwin (Ngathaingchaung Sub-township)		
U Yin Htone	159076	Pan Pu Kwin (Ngathaingchaung Sub-township)		
Ah Lel Su	159075	Pan Pu Kwin (Ngathaingchaung Sub-township)		
Kyaung Su	159074	Pan Pu Kwin (Ngathaingchaung Sub-township)		
Bon Ma Yar Zar Kone	151396	Daunt Gyi (Ngathaingchaung Sub-township)		
Kin Mun Chin Kone	151394	Daunt Gyi (Ngathaingchaung Sub-township)		
Daunt Gyi Ywar Ma	151389	Daunt Gyi (Ngathaingchaung Sub-township)		
Kyaung Su	151390	Daunt Gyi (Ngathaingchaung Sub-township)		
Ah Htet Su	151397	Daunt Gyi (Ngathaingchaung Sub-township)		
Ah Lel Su	151395	Daunt Gyi (Ngathaingchaung Sub-township)		
Mee Thway Kone	151393	Daunt Gyi (Ngathaingchaung Sub-township)		
Tar Gyi	151392	Daunt Gyi (Ngathaingchaung Sub-township)		
Yoke Thay Kone	151391	Daunt Gyi (Ngathaingchaung Sub-township)		
Kywe Lan	163361	Yae Nant Thar (Ngathaingchaung Sub-township)		
Khon Pin Yoe	163369	Yae Nant Thar (Ngathaingchaung Sub-township)		
Kyauk Chaung	163368	Yae Nant Thar (Ngathaingchaung Sub-township)		
Thaung	163367	Yae Nant Thar (Ngathaingchaung Sub-township)		
Oke Hpo Inn	163366	Yae Nant Thar (Ngathaingchaung Sub-township)		
Wea Gyi Daunt	163365	Yae Nant Thar (Ngathaingchaung Sub-township)		
Tha Pyu Pin	163364	Yae Nant Thar (Ngathaingchaung Sub-township)		
Sa Bai Yoe	163363	Yae Nant Thar (Ngathaingchaung Sub-township)		
Kwin Gyi	163362	Yae Nant Thar (Ngathaingchaung Sub-township)		
Me Za Li	150926	Boke Chaung (Ngathaingchaung Sub-township)		
Kyun U	150927	Boke Chaung (Ngathaingchaung Sub-township)		
Boke Chaung	150925	Boke Chaung (Ngathaingchaung Sub-township)		
Yae Le Gyi	155275	Kyat Kwin (Ngathaingchaung Sub-township)		
Kyat Kwin	155271	Kyat Kwin (Ngathaingchaung Sub-township)		
Hnget Gyi Aing	155273	Kyat Kwin (Ngathaingchaung Sub-township)		
Kone Ka Lay	155274	Kyat Kwin (Ngathaingchaung Sub-township)		
Kone Gyi	155272	Kyat Kwin (Ngathaingchaung Sub-township)		
