= List of villages in Thabaung Township =

This is a list of villages in Thabaung Township, Pathein District, Ayeyarwady Region, Burma (Myanmar).

Village	Village code	Village tract	Coordinates (links to map & photo sources)	Notes
Wut Laik Kone	161994	Thabaung (Taw)	17.0674°N 94.7679°E	
Kwet Pyin	161993	Thabaung (Taw)	17.0667°N 94.7833°E	
Kyein Chon	161995	Thabaung (Taw)	17.0654°N 94.7909°E	
Pein Hne Kone	161996	Thabaung (Taw)		
Kun Chan Su	161997	Thabaung (Taw)		
Oke Ta Dar Kone	154432	Kin Tat		
Taung Tha Yet Kone	154438	Kin Tat		
Ka Nyin Kone	154439	Kin Tat		
Pan Taw Gyi	154440	Kin Tat		
Na Gar Aing	154436	Kin Tat		
Do Chaung	154435	Kin Tat		
Ngu Chaung Byaik	154437	Kin Tat		
Kyauk Gyi	154433	Kin Tat	16.9324°N 94.7672°E	
Ngu Chaung	154441	Kin Tat		
Kin Tat	154431	Kin Tat	16.95°N 94.75°E	
Nyaung Pin Lay Seik	154434	Kin Tat		
Na Be Kyei	154310	Khat Ti Ya		
May Yi Kone	154309	Khat Ti Ya		
Ywar Thit Kone	154307	Khat Ti Ya		
Me Za Li Kone	154305	Khat Ti Ya	17.0178°N 94.7968°E	
Khat Ti Ya	154304	Khat Ti Ya		
Kyun Kone	154308	Khat Ti Ya	16.9563°N 94.6875°E	
Paik Tan	154311	Khat Ti Ya		
Gway Tauk Chaung	154306	Khat Ti Ya		
Kyar Inn Kwin	160440	Shwe Taung Kyun		
Shwe Taung Kyun	160438	Shwe Taung Kyun	16.9657°N 94.7946°E	
Oe Bo Lay	160439	Shwe Taung Kyun		
Lay Khun Sint	158305	Nga Wun Daunt Gyi		
Shaw Kone	158304	Nga Wun Daunt Gyi		
Pein Hne Chaung	158303	Nga Wun Daunt Gyi		
Tha Pyu Ngu	158302	Nga Wun Daunt Gyi	16.9833°N 94.7667°E	
Nga Wun Daunt Gyi	158301	Nga Wun Daunt Gyi	16.9692°N 94.7506°E	
Dar Ka Nyaung Kone	151352	Dar Ka Nyaung Kone	16.964°N 94.829°E	
Ma Gyi Kone	151353	Dar Ka Nyaung Kone	16.9616°N 94.8499°E	
Boe Pyar Lay Ah Su	160406	Shwe Nyaung Pin		
Hpa Yar Ngu	160405	Shwe Nyaung Pin		
Shwe Nyaung Pin	160403	Shwe Nyaung Pin	17.0285°N 94.8332°E	
Sit Sin	160404	Shwe Nyaung Pin		
Tha Yet Kone	161646	Tha Min Kone	17.0084°N 94.805°E	
Nyaung Kone Lay	161645	Tha Min Kone	17.0084°N 94.805°E	
Thi Tat	161644	Tha Min Kone	16.9745°N 94.8193°E	
Pauk Tan	161643	Tha Min Kone	16.9878°N 94.8136°E	
Kyauk Sa Yit Kone	161642	Tha Min Kone	17.0026°N 94.8081°E	
Tha Min Kone	161641	Tha Min Kone	17.0085°N 94.8115°E	
Oe Si Kone	151579	Ein Soe Chaung		
Byaik Su	151585	Ein Soe Chaung		
Thaing Chaung	151580	Ein Soe Chaung		
Kyun Nyo Gyi	151581	Ein Soe Chaung		
Oe Bo Gyi	151582	Ein Soe Chaung	16.9505°N 94.7951°E	
Ah Shey Bet Kone	151583	Ein Soe Chaung		
Lay Ein Tan	151584	Ein Soe Chaung		
Ein Soe Chaung	151578	Ein Soe Chaung		
Se Gyi	153499	Ka Nyin Pin		
Kant Lant	153498	Ka Nyin Pin		
Ka Nyin Pin	153497	Ka Nyin Pin	17.0951°N 94.9184°E	
Gwa Taw	153500	Ka Nyin Pin		
Da Lel Et	153501	Ka Nyin Pin		
Inn Ka Lay	152687	Htan Zin Hla Kyoet Kone	17.1°N 94.9167°E	
Htan Zin Hla Kyoet Kone	152686	Htan Zin Hla Kyoet Kone		
Kwin Lel Su	152688	Htan Zin Hla Kyoet Kone		
Dei Kone	151523	Dei Kone	17.0724°N 94.8387°E	
Gway Tauk Kwin	151527	Dei Kone	17.0858°N 94.8628°E	
Thit Seint Kone	151526	Dei Kone	17.0872°N 94.8615°E	
Kone Tan Gyi	151524	Dei Kone	17.0732°N 94.8469°E	
Gyone Gyone Kya	151528	Dei Kone	17.0841°N 94.8767°E	
Pa Ni Kwin	151525	Dei Kone	17.0793°N 94.8478°E	
Htan Pin Kwin	157089	Ma Gyi Kone	17.0833°N 94.9035°E	
Yae Kyaw Lay	157093	Ma Gyi Kone	17.0642°N 94.9036°E	
Ywar Haung	157094	Ma Gyi Kone	17.0566°N 94.8929°E	
Ma Gyi Kone	157086	Ma Gyi Kone	17.0755°N 94.8969°E	
Yae Kyaw Wa	157092	Ma Gyi Kone	17.0591°N 94.8995°E	
Gwa Taw	157091	Ma Gyi Kone	17.0905°N 94.9089°E	
Wea Daunt	157090	Ma Gyi Kone	17.0849°N 94.9082°E	
Tha Pyu Pin	157095	Ma Gyi Kone	17.0849°N 94.8848°E	
Kone Lel Su	157088	Ma Gyi Kone	17.0708°N 94.891°E	
Htan Pin Chaung	157087	Ma Gyi Kone	17.0795°N 94.891°E	
Mar La Kar Kone	161947	Tha Yet Taw		
Pan Pin Seik	161954	Tha Yet Taw		
Thin Gan Ngu	161952	Tha Yet Taw		
Kan Ka Lay	161951	Tha Yet Taw		
Kyon Tone	161950	Tha Yet Taw		
Ta Bu	161949	Tha Yet Taw		
Yae Le Gyi	161946	Tha Yet Taw		
Ta Bu Wa	161953	Tha Yet Taw		
Tha Yet Taw	161945	Tha Yet Taw	17.0901°N 94.8668°E	
Thar Yar Kone	161948	Tha Yet Taw		
Ka Nyin Kone	155243	Kyar Ye		
Htan Kyun	155244	Kyar Ye		
Nyaung Kone	155245	Kyar Ye		
Kyaw Tan Gyi	155246	Kyar Ye	17.0533°N 94.9711°E	
Win Ka Bar	155247	Kyar Ye		
Man Taing Kan Nar Su	155249	Kyar Ye		
Ka Tet Yoe	155242	Kyar Ye		
Kyar Ye	155241	Kyar Ye	17.0524°N 94.939°E	
Man Taing Kone Su	155248	Kyar Ye	17.0848°N 94.9787°E	
Ohn Pin Su	151713	Gon Min		
Thea Pwet	151712	Gon Min		
Gon Min	151711	Gon Min	17.0281°N 95.0233°E	
Sit Pin Gyi	160692	Sit Pin Gyi	17.0833°N 95°E	
Hnget San Kyun	160693	Sit Pin Gyi		
Hpa Yar Ni	152406	Hpa Yar Ni	17.0271°N 94.9668°E	
Ma Gyi Pin su	161778	Tha Pyay Kyun		
Ku Toet Seik	161779	Tha Pyay Kyun		
Ta Ku Pon	161777	Tha Pyay Kyun		
Khat Ohn Chaung	161776	Tha Pyay Kyun		
Auk Su	161780	Tha Pyay Kyun		
Tha Pyay Kyun	161775	Tha Pyay Kyun	16.9813°N 94.9634°E	
Kyun Kone	156261	Kyun Kone	16.9534°N 94.6906°E	
Ka Nyin Hmyaung	156262	Kyun Kone	16.9611°N 94.6936°E	
Kyauk Aing	156263	Kyun Kone	16.9555°N 94.6695°E	
Nga Kyut Kone	156264	Kyun Kone	16.9418°N 94.6784°E	
San Gyi	156265	Kyun Kone	16.9708°N 94.6952°E	
Pwe Kyaw	156266	Kyun Kone	16.9632°N 94.6797°E	
Kyauk Hpyar	156267	Kyun Kone		
Kwin Kauk	154906	Kwin Kauk	16.9817°N 94.7322°E	
Kun Chan Kone	154908	Kwin Kauk	17.1066°N 94.7696°E	
Oe Bo	154907	Kwin Kauk		
Ywar Thit Kone	160464	Shwe Zan Oe	16.9864°N 94.7103°E	
Kyet Paung San	160465	Shwe Zan Oe		
Yae San	160466	Shwe Zan Oe	16.9869°N 94.7088°E	
Shwe Zan Oe	160462	Shwe Zan Oe		
Kyar Lu	160467	Shwe Zan Oe		
Thaing Kwin	160463	Shwe Zan Oe		
Sar Hpyu Kone	162391	Thea Phyu		
Kyaung Kone Lay	162395	Thea Phyu		
Htin Pon Kwin	162393	Thea Phyu		
Thea Hpyu Lay	162389	Thea Phyu		
Pauk Kyaw	162390	Thea Phyu		
Than Hlyet Sun	162388	Thea Phyu		
Ah Lel Kone	162394	Thea Phyu		
Thea Hpyu	162387	Thea Phyu		
Nan Lone Kyaing	162392	Thea Phyu		
Doe Ngu	150580	Aung Tat		
Aung Tat	150577	Aung Tat		
Ah Su Gyi	150578	Aung Tat	16.9258°N 94.715°E	
Let Khoke	150579	Aung Tat		
Hpei Kone	150581	Aung Tat		
Ma Yan Kone	164021	Zee Hpyu Kwin		
Taung Yar Kone	164025	Zee Hpyu Kwin	17.0802°N 94.8119°E	
Ma Yin Kone	164024	Zee Hpyu Kwin		
Kan Kone	164022	Zee Hpyu Kwin	16.9355°N 94.7261°E	
Kun Thee Chan	164020	Zee Hpyu Kwin	16.9577°N 94.7277°E	
Ta Pin Chaung	164019	Zee Hpyu Kwin		
Kun Chan Kone	164023	Zee Hpyu Kwin		
Zee Hpyu Kwin	164018	Zee Hpyu Kwin		
Kyoet Kone	158306	Nga Wun Kyoet Kone		
Saing Gyi Kwin	158307	Nga Wun Kyoet Kone		
Htin Seik	158308	Nga Wun Kyoet Kone		
Shauk Chaung	158309	Nga Wun Kyoet Kone		
Nyaung Chin Kone	158310	Nga Wun Kyoet Kone		
Kun Chan Kone	158311	Nga Wun Kyoet Kone		
Maung Hnit Ma Kone	154391	Khway Koke		
Ah Nan Kone	154389	Khway Koke	17.2°N 94.85°E	
Khway Koke	154388	Khway Koke	17.2062°N 94.8698°E	
But Gyi Kone	154395	Khway Koke		
Taung Tet Gyi	154398	Khway Koke	17.2164°N 94.8714°E	
San Chaung	154396	Khway Koke		
Ywar Thit Kone	154397	Khway Koke		
Ga Mone Kyaw	154393	Khway Koke		
Ngar Hin Ngar Hlyar Shey	154394	Khway Koke		
Htan Pin Kone	154390	Khway Koke		
Wun Lo Kei	154392	Khway Koke		
Ga Yet Shey	152353	Hpa Yar Kone		
Nga Hmat Sein Kone	152352	Hpa Yar Kone		
Hle Tauk Kone	152351	Hpa Yar Kone	17.1875°N 94.8827°E	
Kywe Hpyu Chaung	152350	Hpa Yar Kone		
Myet To	152349	Hpa Yar Kone		
Kyein Ta Li	152348	Hpa Yar Kone		
Hpa Yar Kone	152347	Hpa Yar Kone	17.1525°N 94.8758°E	
Yae Twin Kone	152354	Hpa Yar Kone		
Bwar Gyi Chaw	152358	Hpa Yar Kone		
Kyaung Kone	152357	Hpa Yar Kone		
La Har Ga Mon Wa	152355	Hpa Yar Kone		
Inn Kone	152356	Hpa Yar Kone		
Taw Ga Yet	156477	La Har Ga Mon		
Kyut Nwe Kwin	156475	La Har Ga Mon		
Htauk Kyant Kwin	156474	La Har Ga Mon	17.18°N 94.8392°E	
Kone Sun	156478	La Har Ga Mon		
La Har Ga Mon	156473	La Har Ga Mon	17.1667°N 94.8333°E	
Lel Di	156476	La Har Ga Mon	17.1887°N 94.8512°E	
Ta Loke Ma	156479	La Har Ga Mon		
Mi Chaung Kaik	151688	Gon Hnyin Tan		
Gon Hnyin Tan	151686	Gon Hnyin Tan	17.0421°N 94.9373°E	
Kwin Hlyar Saung	151687	Gon Hnyin Tan		
Hnget Pyaw Taw	152203	Hnget Pyaw Taw	16.9476°N 94.8901°E	
Ku Lar Wea	152205	Hnget Pyaw Taw	16.9544°N 94.8838°E	
Me Win Chaung	152206	Hnget Pyaw Taw		
Pauk Tan	152207	Hnget Pyaw Taw	16.9628°N 94.8919°E	
Ta Khun Taing	152208	Hnget Pyaw Taw	16.9625°N 94.888°E	
Kan Hlyar Kone	152209	Hnget Pyaw Taw	16.9579°N 94.8966°E	
Sar Hpyu Su	152210	Hnget Pyaw Taw	16.9539°N 94.8917°E	
Shan Chaung	152204	Hnget Pyaw Taw	16.9518°N 94.874°E	
Ka Thit Tan	164038	Zee Pin Kwin	16.9501°N 94.8606°E	
Zee Pin Kwin	164037	Zee Pin Kwin	16.9538°N 94.8531°E	
Shan Chaung	164039	Zee Pin Kwin	16.9518°N 94.8738°E	
Nwe Ni Chaung	158399	Nwe Ni Chaung	17.0072°N 94.8598°E	
Myet San Ni	158400	Nwe Ni Chaung		
Mee Thway Taik	157550	Mee Thway Taik	17.051°N 94.8618°E	
Ah Lel Kyun	157557	Mee Thway Taik		
Seik Gyi	157558	Mee Thway Taik		
Kwin Lel Su	157560	Mee Thway Taik		
Nga Man Chaung	157551	Mee Thway Taik		
Than Pu Yar	157552	Mee Thway Taik	17.0421°N 94.8842°E	
Bay Kar	157553	Mee Thway Taik		
Ka Nyin Kone	157554	Mee Thway Taik		
Yae Kyo	157555	Mee Thway Taik		
Wea Daunt	157556	Mee Thway Taik		
Yae Twin Kone	157559	Mee Thway Taik		
Sin Lan	160548	Sin Lan		
Ohn Pin Su	160549	Sin Lan		
Khway Thay Kone	160550	Sin Lan		
Gyone Gyone Kya	160551	Sin Lan		
Ah Shey Sin Lan	160552	Sin Lan		
Yone Chaung	160553	Sin Lan		
Daik Gyi Kone	160554	Sin Lan		
Kun Tan	158843	Oke Shit		
Maung U Kone	158845	Oke Shit		
Lein Kone	158844	Oke Shit		
Oke Shit	158836	Oke Shit	17.0214°N 94.9132°E	
Pan Pin Seik	158842	Oke Shit		
Mi Chaung Kaik	158841	Oke Shit		
Ka Nyin Kone	158840	Oke Shit		
Hnget Paw Taw	158839	Oke Shit		
Ta To	158838	Oke Shit		
Lay Ein Tan	158837	Oke Shit		
Seik Gyi	157496	Me Za Li Kwin Pauk	16.9482°N 94.9114°E	
Tha Bawt Chaung	157497	Me Za Li Kwin Pauk	16.9594°N 94.904°E	
Ah Nyar Tan	157499	Me Za Li Kwin Pauk		
Hpan Khar Kone	157498	Me Za Li Kwin Pauk	16.9703°N 94.9221°E	
Ah Nauk Su	157495	Me Za Li Kwin Pauk		
Me Za Li Kwin Pauk	157494	Me Za Li Kwin Pauk		
Lin Tar Kya	156983	Lin Tar Kya	17.0333°N 94.85°E	
Nyaung Pin Thar	156984	Lin Tar Kya		
Tha Yet Oke	160478	Si Son	17.0478°N 94.8113°E	
Si Son	160473	Si Son	17.0658°N 94.8242°E	
Pein Hne Kone	160474	Si Son	17.0659°N 94.8256°E	
Auk Dei Kone	160475	Si Son	17.073°N 94.8354°E	
Thaung Tan	160477	Si Son		
Tha Bawt Chaung	160476	Si Son	17.0522°N 94.8114°E	
Ka Nyin Kone	160318	Shin Gyi Pyauk		
Ma Au Pin Daunt	160319	Shin Gyi Pyauk		
Than Kyoe Taing	160320	Shin Gyi Pyauk		
Shin Gyi Pyauk	160317	Shin Gyi Pyauk	17.0489°N 94.857°E	
Kyet Thun Kwin	151989	Hlay Gyi Pyet	17.0224°N 94.7751°E	
Nan Nan Pin Kone	151988	Hlay Gyi Pyet	17.0351°N 94.7879°E	
Hlay Gyi Pyet	151987	Hlay Gyi Pyet	17.0303°N 94.7794°E	
Hpa Yar U	151990	Hlay Gyi Pyet	17.0005°N 94.7741°E	
Thea Hpyu Kone	151995	Hlay Gyi Pyet	17.0416°N 94.7842°E	
Oke Pon Kone	151991	Hlay Gyi Pyet	17.0062°N 94.7488°E	
Yae Twin Kone	151992	Hlay Gyi Pyet	17.0033°N 94.7667°E	
Doe San	151993	Hlay Gyi Pyet	17.0374°N 94.779°E	
Tat Kone	151994	Hlay Gyi Pyet	17.0167°N 94.7442°E	
Lel Di Gyi	159607	Pyin Ma Htone		
Kyauk Twin	159606	Pyin Ma Htone		
Tha Pyay Kone	159608	Pyin Ma Htone	17.0993°N 94.774°E	
Tan Hlyar Gyi	159609	Pyin Ma Htone	17.0859°N 94.7758°E	
Lay Tin Kya	159604	Pyin Ma Htone		
Chin Kone	159603	Pyin Ma Htone	17.0921°N 94.7754°E	
Thu Htay San	159602	Pyin Ma Htone	17.1204°N 94.7862°E	
Taw Kywe Kwin	159601	Pyin Ma Htone	17.1018°N 94.7708°E	
Sein Gyi	159600	Pyin Ma Htone	17.0895°N 94.764°E	
Myauk Hpyu	159599	Pyin Ma Htone		
Pyin Ma Htone	159598	Pyin Ma Htone	17.0778°N 94.7705°E	
Kun Chan Kone	159605	Pyin Ma Htone	17.1069°N 94.7697°E	
Myauk Pan Kone	161195	Taung Ka Lay	17.0864°N 94.7832°E	
Sin Ku	161194	Taung Ka Lay	17.0716°N 94.8°E	
Taung Ka Lay	161193	Taung Ka Lay	17.0628°N 94.8079°E	
Bant Bway Kone	161197	Taung Ka Lay		
Wet Lar Lay	161196	Taung Ka Lay	17.1009°N 94.7966°E	
Oke Pon	160200	Shan Ma Myaung	17.0749°N 94.8218°E	
Gway Kone	160201	Shan Ma Myaung	17.0784°N 94.8229°E	
Wea Gyi Daunt	160202	Shan Ma Myaung	17.0786°N 94.8292°E	
Taung Yar Kone	160203	Shan Ma Myaung	17.0782°N 94.8115°E	
Ah Haung Pin Kyaing	160204	Shan Ma Myaung	17.103°N 94.8021°E	
Shan Ma Myaung	160199	Shan Ma Myaung	17.0742°N 94.8208°E	
Ka Nyin Kwin	161224	Taung Kwin		
Lu That Kone	161225	Taung Kwin		
Hle Kyaw	161223	Taung Kwin		
Pan Taw	161222	Taung Kwin		
Taung Kwin	161219	Taung Kwin	17.1389°N 94.8124°E	
Than Pu Yar Pin Seik	161220	Taung Kwin		
Let Pan Kwin	161221	Taung Kwin		
San Kant Lant	161226	Taung Kwin		
War Yar Chaung	154789	Kwin Chauk	17.1166°N 94.7091°E	
Ta Loke Pin Kwin	154788	Kwin Chauk		
Kwin Chauk	154787	Kwin Chauk	17°N 94.7167°E	
Ah Lel Kone	160015	Saung Bon		
Thone Ein Su	160014	Saung Bon	17.0956°N 94.8528°E	
Saung Bon	160011	Saung Bon	17.1003°N 94.8516°E	
Kyun Pu Lu	160012	Saung Bon	17.0839°N 94.8472°E	
Mee Swea Hmyaung	160013	Saung Bon		
Seik Gyi	160935	Ta Loke Kone		
Kywe Gaung	160937	Ta Loke Kone		
Ah Ngu Gyi	160936	Ta Loke Kone		
Daing Gyi Kwin	160938	Ta Loke Kone		
Nwar Htaung	160939	Ta Loke Kone	17.1384°N 94.8592°E	
U To	160941	Ta Loke Kone		
Kyat Kone	160934	Ta Loke Kone		
Sauk Ta Lone	160942	Ta Loke Kone		
Doe Nwe San	160944	Ta Loke Kone		
Ta Loke Ma Kone	160945	Ta Loke Kone		
Ta Loke Kone	160933	Ta Loke Kone	17.1113°N 94.8511°E	
Shaw Kone	160943	Ta Loke Kone		
Chaung Wa	160940	Ta Loke Kone		
Sat Thwar	159974	Sat Thwar	17.1718°N 94.9586°E	
Sat Thwar Auk Su	159981	Sat Thwar	17.1704°N 94.9622°E	
Kyar Kyun	159980	Sat Thwar		
Kyee Pin	159978	Sat Thwar		
Shaw Pyar Kone	159977	Sat Thwar		
Kone Su	159976	Sat Thwar		
Kyon Ta Dun	159975	Sat Thwar		
Wet Ngar See	159979	Sat Thwar		
Mi Chaung Khaung	152633	Htan Ta Pin		
Than Pu Yar Chaung	152632	Htan Ta Pin	17.1257°N 94.9334°E	
Htan Ta Pin	152631	Htan Ta Pin		
Shan Kwin	160190	Shan Kwin		
Lel Di Chaung	160192	Shan Kwin	17.15°N 94.9167°E	
Nyaung Kone	160191	Shan Kwin		
Thin Gan Pin Seik	162566	Thin Gan Pin Seik	17.1455°N 94.8849°E	
Thaung	162567	Thin Gan Pin Seik		
Lein Kone	162569	Thin Gan Pin Seik		
Kan Nar Kone Tan Gyi	162570	Thin Gan Pin Seik		
Ma Yin Chaung	162568	Thin Gan Pin Seik		
Thit Poke Kone	162662	Thit Poke Kone	17.1607°N 94.9137°E	
Shan Kwin	162666	Thit Poke Kone	17.1522°N 94.9038°E	
Hpa Yar Ngoke To	162665	Thit Poke Kone		
Auk Su	162663	Thit Poke Kone		
Zee Hpyu Kwin	162664	Thit Poke Kone		
Pauk Kone	153789	Kan Beit Nyaung Kone		
Set Daunt Gyi	153788	Kan Beit Nyaung Kone		
Kan Nar Nyaung Kone	153787	Kan Beit Nyaung Kone		
Kan Beit	153786	Kan Beit Nyaung Kone	17.2108°N 94.9335°E	
Sin Paung Pin	153791	Kan Beit Nyaung Kone		
Nyaung Kone Ywar Ma	153790	Kan Beit Nyaung Kone	17.1983°N 94.9278°E	
Let Khoke Ywar Thit	154945	Kwin Pauk		
Kwin Pauk	154940	Kwin Pauk	17.1899°N 94.9157°E	
Let Khoke	154941	Kwin Pauk		
Kyar Gan	154942	Kwin Pauk	17.1693°N 94.9096°E	
Thone Ein Su	154944	Kwin Pauk		
Tin Koke Gyi	154943	Kwin Pauk		
Khay Nan	154333	Khay Nan	17.2056°N 94.9199°E	
Kyoet Kone	154336	Khay Nan		
Shwe Hlay Kwin	154335	Khay Nan		
Auk Su	154334	Khay Nan		
Nyaung Kwin	154337	Khay Nan		
Seik Gyi	161889	Tha Yet Kone		
Pauk Hlut	161890	Tha Yet Kone		
Lay Pway Kone	161891	Tha Yet Kone		
Kwin Lel Su	161892	Tha Yet Kone		
Nyaung Kwin	161885	Tha Yet Kone	17.2243°N 94.9392°E	
Ah Lel Su	161886	Tha Yet Kone		
Hpa Yar Gyi	161887	Tha Yet Kone		
Shwe Yin Hmyaw	161888	Tha Yet Kone		
Yae Le Gyi	161884	Tha Yet Kone		
Tha Yet Kone	161883	Tha Yet Kone	17.2499°N 94.9176°E	
Ma Yan Cho	157298	Ma Yan Cho	17.2681°N 94.8929°E	
Sein Kwin	157299	Ma Yan Cho	17.25°N 94.8667°E	
San Gyi	157300	Ma Yan Cho		
War Taw Kwin	157301	Ma Yan Cho	17.2667°N 94.8667°E	
Kone Swan	157302	Ma Yan Cho		
Ta Say Chaung	163739	Yone Pin		
Kan Ka Lay	163735	Yone Pin		
Ywar Thit Kone	163736	Yone Pin		
Zee Kone	163737	Yone Pin		
Pa Taw Kone	163738	Yone Pin		
Yone Pin	163734	Yone Pin		
Ah Lel Su	160460	Shwe Yaung Cha		
Let Pan Kwin	160459	Shwe Yaung Cha		
Bon Me Zar	160458	Shwe Yaung Cha	17.2439°N 94.9428°E	
Nyaung Waing	160456	Shwe Yaung Cha		
Ma Ye Kwin	160455	Shwe Yaung Cha	17.2871°N 94.924°E	
Paik Tan	160457	Shwe Yaung Cha		
Kya Khat Hmyaung	160461	Shwe Yaung Cha		
Tha Gyi Lu Su	160454	Shwe Yaung Cha		
Seik Thar	160453	Shwe Yaung Cha	17.2631°N 94.9306°E	
Shwe Yaung Cha	160452	Shwe Yaung Cha		
Kyee Pin	155471	Kyee Pin	17.209°N 94.9636°E	
Da Yei Ku	155472	Kyee Pin		
Sit Kone	155473	Kyee Pin		
Ah Kei Gyi	155474	Kyee Pin	16.9322°N 94.7252°E	
Ywar Thit Kone	155475	Kyee Pin		
Ah Kei Lay	155477	Kyee Pin		
Kyut Kone	155478	Kyee Pin		
Ah Nauk Su	155479	Kyee Pin		
Ya Thayt Kone	155480	Kyee Pin		
Leik Kyaw	155481	Kyee Pin		
Gway Pin Daunt	155476	Kyee Pin		
Htan Ta Pin	155925	Kyon Ta Dun	17.1447°N 94.9481°E	
Pyant Gyi	155923	Kyon Ta Dun		
Thu Pein Ta	155924	Kyon Ta Dun		
Kyon Ta Dun	155922	Kyon Ta Dun	17.1587°N 94.955°E	
Hnget Pyaw Taw Chaung	155926	Kyon Ta Dun		
Hpa Yar Kone	158187	Nga Bat Chaung		
Yone Pin Auk Su	158186	Nga Bat Chaung		
Sin Kone	158184	Nga Bat Chaung		
Hnaw Kone	158178	Nga Bat Chaung		
Ma Yan Kone	158179	Nga Bat Chaung		
Tha Yet Kone	158180	Nga Bat Chaung		
Lel Di Lay	158183	Nga Bat Chaung		
Gyo Gyar Kwin	158185	Nga Bat Chaung	17.2512°N 94.9949°E	
Lel Di	158182	Nga Bat Chaung		
Shauk Chaung	158181	Nga Bat Chaung		
Leik Kyaw	160316	Shaw Pyar Kone		
Ka Nyin Chaung	160314	Shaw Pyar Kone		
Shaw Pyar Kone	160313	Shaw Pyar Kone	17.1832°N 94.9684°E	
Kyar Kyun	160315	Shaw Pyar Kone		
Htan Zin Hla	152685	Htan Zin Hla	17.11°N 94.9372°E	
Thar Paung Lay	156227	Kyun Hlyar Gyi	17.2441°N 94.6646°E	
Ma Yan Kyin	156230	Kyun Hlyar Gyi	17.21°N 94.6614°E	
Kan Chaung	156228	Kyun Hlyar Gyi	17.2841°N 94.6175°E	
Kyun Hlyar Gyi	156226	Kyun Hlyar Gyi	17.2559°N 94.6266°E	
Yae Cho Gyi	156229	Kyun Hlyar Gyi	17.2434°N 94.646°E	
Kyar Gaung	162605	Thit Hpyu	17.2937°N 94.6456°E	
Taung Tan	162609	Thit Hpyu	17.0397°N 94.82°E	
Thit Wan Pu	162608	Thit Hpyu	17.2691°N 94.6468°E	
U To	162607	Thit Hpyu		
Thit Hpyu	162602	Thit Hpyu	17.3457°N 94.6529°E	
Kwin Waing	162606	Thit Hpyu		
Hlay Gyi Khon	162603	Thit Hpyu		
Ein Myint	162604	Thit Hpyu		
