= List of villages in Kyaunggon Township =

This is a list of villages in Kyaunggon Township, Pathein District, Ayeyarwady Region, Burma (Myanmar).

Village	Village code	Village tract	Coordinates (links to map & photo sources)	Notes
Auk Su	153544	Ka Nyin Thone Sint		
Nyaung Waing	153538	Ka Nyin Thone Sint		
Ka Nyin Thone Sint	153537	Ka Nyin Thone Sint	17.0663°N 95.2935°E	
Nat Yae Twin	153540	Ka Nyin Thone Sint		
Kwin Sat	153541	Ka Nyin Thone Sint		
Taung Su	153542	Ka Nyin Thone Sint		
Taung Yar Tan	153543	Ka Nyin Thone Sint		
Ah Lel Su	153539	Ka Nyin Thone Sint	17.0644°N 95.3204°E	
Hlay Swea	154835	Kwin Gyi		
Pein Ga Yet Gyi	154834	Kwin Gyi	17.0972°N 95.2637°E	
Kwin Gyi	154828	Kwin Gyi		
Hnget Yoe	154833	Kwin Gyi		
Tu Myaung	154831	Kwin Gyi		
Waw Mi	154832	Kwin Gyi		
Ga Yet Wun Lay	154829	Kwin Gyi		
Ga Yet Wun Gyi	154830	Kwin Gyi		
Pyar Za Let	150316	Ah Su Gyi		
Ah Su Gyi	150313	Ah Su Gyi	17.1503°N 95.282°E	
Aung Pan Chaung	150315	Ah Su Gyi		
Kun Chan Kone Ywar Thit	150323	Ah Su Gyi		
Lel Di Su	150322	Ah Su Gyi		
Ma Gyi Tan	150321	Ah Su Gyi		
Htan Kone	150320	Ah Su Gyi		
Gyoet Pin Seik	150319	Ah Su Gyi		
Naung Ku Bo	150318	Ah Su Gyi		
Kun Chan Kone	150317	Ah Su Gyi	17.1408°N 95.2965°E	
Ga Nein lay	150314	Ah Su Gyi		
Shwe Hlay Gyi	163157	Wet Chaung		
Shwe Hlay Lay	163156	Wet Chaung		
Hta Min Soke Kone	163158	Wet Chaung		
Wet Chaung	163155	Wet Chaung		
Kyaung Aing	155360	Kyaung Aing	17.1189°N 95.2399°E	
Tha Yet Chaung	155361	Kyaung Aing		
Taung Yar Su	155362	Kyaung Aing		
Pet Tan	155364	Kyaung Aing		
Pyaw Bwe Kone	155363	Kyaung Aing	17.1423°N 95.24°E	
Htan Pin Su	157732	Moe Ma Kha		
Moe Ma Kha Kan Daunt	157728	Moe Ma Kha	17.1164°N 95.2239°E	
Kwin Wa Su	157733	Moe Ma Kha		
Daung Su	157729	Moe Ma Kha		
Kone Gyi Su	157730	Moe Ma Kha		
Lel Di Su	157731	Moe Ma Kha		
Ywar Thar Kone	163783	Ywar Thar Kone	17.1475°N 95.2133°E	
Gon Hnyin Tan	163789	Ywar Thar Kone		
Pein Ga Yet Kha Lay	163787	Ywar Thar Kone		
Hpu Taik	163786	Ywar Thar Kone		
Nyaung Waing	163785	Ywar Thar Kone		
Tha Hpan Pin Seik	163784	Ywar Thar Kone	17.1363°N 95.2006°E	
Ein Taing Kone	163790	Ywar Thar Kone		
Pu Zun Mhint	163788	Ywar Thar Kone		
Hmaw Thay	162676	Thit Seint Kone		
Shwe Ka Nyin Pin	162675	Thit Seint Kone		
Chaung Thone Gwa	162674	Thit Seint Kone		
Sat Kwin	162673	Thit Seint Kone		
Nat Chaung	162672	Thit Seint Kone		
Thit Seint Kone	162671	Thit Seint Kone		
Ah Shey Su	153751	Kaing Tar		
Sun Par	153748	Kaing Tar		
Pein Ga Yet	153750	Kaing Tar	17.1012°N 95.2438°E	
Ywar Thit Kone	153752	Kaing Tar		
Kaing Tar	153747	Kaing Tar	17.0908°N 95.2258°E	
Kyee Taw	153749	Kaing Tar		
Ah Wa Su	160853	Ta Khun Taing		
Ta Khun Taing	160849	Ta Khun Taing	17.0711°N 95.2325°E	
Waw Mi	160854	Ta Khun Taing		
Ta Loke Kone	160852	Ta Khun Taing		
Ah Lel Su	160851	Ta Khun Taing		
Shwe Kyay Su	160850	Ta Khun Taing		
Ah Nauk Kywe Lan	163918	Za Yat Kwin		
Hti Man	163919	Za Yat Kwin		
Za Yat Kwin	163913	Za Yat Kwin	17.072°N 95.2586°E	
Ah Shey Kywe Lan	163917	Za Yat Kwin		
Sar Hpyu Su	163914	Za Yat Kwin		
Tu Myaung Waw Mi	163915	Za Yat Kwin		
Su Pa Daung Kwin	163916	Za Yat Kwin		
Mei Taw Pyan	150996	Byaik		
Hpa Yar Kone	150999	Byaik		
Byaik	150992	Byaik	17.0632°N 95.236°E	
Lay Ein Tan	150993	Byaik		
Kyon Tar Wa	150995	Byaik		
Koke Ko Su	150997	Byaik		
Ah Nauk Su	150998	Byaik		
Taung Su	151001	Byaik		
Ywar Thit Kone	151002	Byaik		
Shwe Yoe Kyar	151003	Byaik		
Kyon Tar Yoe	150994	Byaik		
Kwin Sat Gyi	151000	Byaik		
Aye Mya	151004	Byaik		
Moe Pyar (East)	157738	Moe Pyar (East)		
Ah Lel su	157739	Moe Pyar (East)		
Lan Win Su	157740	Moe Pyar (East)		
Tha Yet Kone	157741	Moe Pyar (East)		
Kyon Tar	157675	Min Ma Naing	17.0443°N 95.227°E	
Min Ma Naing	157674	Min Ma Naing	17.0379°N 95.2093°E	
War Taw	157676	Min Ma Naing		
Lel Di	157677	Min Ma Naing		
Kauk Gyi Kone	154116	Kauk Gyi Kone	17.0231°N 95.2216°E	
Lel Di	154121	Kauk Gyi Kone		
Tha Yet Taw	154117	Kauk Gyi Kone		
Ohn Taw	154118	Kauk Gyi Kone		
Min Ma Naing	154120	Kauk Gyi Kone		
Ku Lar Su	154119	Kauk Gyi Kone		
Kyar Kaik	152513	Hpone Soe		
Hpone Soe	152512	Hpone Soe	17.0118°N 95.207°E	
Sit Kone	152514	Hpone Soe		
Chaung Gyi	152516	Hpone Soe		
Kan Gyi Wa	152515	Hpone Soe		
Thit Seint Kone	152697	Htauk Shar		
Hpone Soe Lay	152695	Htauk Shar		
Htauk Shar	152694	Htauk Shar	16.9974°N 95.1963°E	
Nar Ka Sar	152698	Htauk Shar		
Kywe Ku Seik	152696	Htauk Shar		
Pan Taw Su	160152	Shan		
Ah Su Gyi	160149	Shan		
Kone Shan	160148	Shan		
Kan Nar Shan	160147	Shan		
Ah Lel su	160150	Shan		
Sin Doe	160153	Shan		
Tin Koke Gyi	160151	Shan		
Chaung Gyi	151103	Chaung Gyi	17.0069°N 95.1956°E	
Shan (Myanmar)	151105	Chaung Gyi	16.9786°N 95.1867°E	
Shan (Kayin)	151106	Chaung Gyi	16.9866°N 95.1892°E	
Ein Taing Kone	151104	Chaung Gyi	16.9905°N 95.1874°E	
Nyaung Ngu	155192	Kyar Kaik		
Kyon Tar	155191	Kyar Kaik		
Aing Waing	155190	Kyar Kaik		
Kyar Kaik	155182	Kyar Kaik	17.0178°N 95.1997°E	
Ah Lel Su	155185	Kyar Kaik		
Yae Twin Kone	155186	Kyar Kaik		
Kyun Kyar (East)	155187	Kyar Kaik		
Htein Kone	155183	Kyar Kaik		
U Yin Tan	155189	Kyar Kaik		
Kyun Kyar (West)	155188	Kyar Kaik		
Nauk Chay	155184	Kyar Kaik		
Ba Win Seik	163230	Yae Ga Loke		
Yae Ga Loke	163226	Yae Ga Loke	17.0629°N 95.1747°E	
Moe Pyar	163227	Yae Ga Loke	17.0531°N 95.1974°E	
Chaung Wa	163229	Yae Ga Loke		
Pauk Ngu	163231	Yae Ga Loke		
Tha Pyay Kwin	163232	Yae Ga Loke		
Ywar Thit	163228	Yae Ga Loke		
Pan Pin Seik	150632	Ba Li Daunt		
Ba Win Seik	150631	Ba Li Daunt		
Ba Li Daunt	150627	Ba Li Daunt	17.0433°N 95.1558°E	
Ba Li Kwin	150628	Ba Li Daunt		
Ohn Pin Su	150630	Ba Li Daunt		
Kaing Hlyar Shey	150629	Ba Li Daunt		
Chaung Wa	161460	Tet Seik		
Kan Thar Yar	161461	Tet Seik		
Kyaung Su	161459	Tet Seik		
Kyu Kwin	161458	Tet Seik		
Nyaung Aing	161457	Tet Seik		
Tet Seik	161456	Tet Seik		
Pein Chaung	151547	Doe Tan		
Hpyan Twin	151546	Doe Tan		
Doe Tan	151545	Doe Tan	17.0167°N 95.15°E	
Thaung Gyi	162226	Thaung Gyi	17°N 95.15°E	
Kan Kone	162227	Thaung Gyi		
Hpa Yar Gyi Kone	152310	Hpa Yar Gyi Kone	16.9598°N 95.1716°E	
Shunt Ga Yet	152312	Hpa Yar Gyi Kone		
Shan	152313	Hpa Yar Gyi Kone	16.9823°N 95.188°E	
Ta Khun Taing	152311	Hpa Yar Gyi Kone		
Sin Ku	160520	Sin Ku		
Hpone Gyi Aing	160522	Sin Ku		
Tha Yet Pin Seik	160521	Sin Ku		
Ah Lel Su	157070	Ma Gyi Chaung		
Sar Hpyu Su	157071	Ma Gyi Chaung		
Ma Gyi Chaung	157069	Ma Gyi Chaung		
Pauk Ngu	159179	Pauk Ngu	16.9812°N 95.1366°E	
Daunt Kway (Myanmar Su)	151452	Daunt Kway		
Kyun Chaung	151454	Daunt Kway		
Kwin Baw	151455	Daunt Kway		
Daunt Kway (Kayin Su)	151451	Daunt Kway		
Bee Lin	151453	Daunt Kway	17°N 95.15°E	
Laung Taing	159998	Sauk Aing	16.9521°N 95.1311°E	
Kaing Waing	160002	Sauk Aing		
Htan Kone	160001	Sauk Aing		
Se Su	160000	Sauk Aing		
Tha Yet Pin Seik	159999	Sauk Aing		
Sauk Aing	159997	Sauk Aing		
Kyaung Kone Su	163960	Za Yat Seik	17°N 95.1167°E	
Kun Chan Kone	163954	Za Yat Seik		
Kan Nar Taw Nyo	163958	Za Yat Seik		
Za Yat Seik	163953	Za Yat Seik	16.9833°N 95.1°E	
Kone Taw Nyo	163959	Za Yat Seik		
Tha Yet Pin Gyi	163957	Za Yat Seik		
Yoe Gyi	163956	Za Yat Seik		
Kwin Hlyar Saung	163955	Za Yat Seik		
Kyauk Taing Kone	155120	Kyar Ga Yet		
Kyar Ga Yet (Ah Nauk Su)	155114	Kyar Ga Yet		
Ohn Pin Su	155115	Kyar Ga Yet		
Thet Kei Kone	155116	Kyar Ga Yet		
U Lu Hla Su	155121	Kyar Ga Yet		
Kyee Aing	155119	Kyar Ga Yet	16.9564°N 95.1227°E	
Sar Hpyu Su	155118	Kyar Ga Yet		
Htee Khan	155117	Kyar Ga Yet	16.9774°N 95.1182°E	
Kyan Khin	153765	Kaing Waing		
Tha Yet Thone Pin	153763	Kaing Waing		
Kwin Hlyar Shey Saung	153769	Kaing Waing		
Ma Yan Waing	153761	Kaing Waing		
Kaing Waing	153760	Kaing Waing		
Kyar Koke	153764	Kaing Waing		
Sin Gaung	153762	Kaing Waing		
Mway Hauk (Ah Shey Su)	153768	Kaing Waing		
Nat Hta Min Kone	153770	Kaing Waing		
Kan Su	153771	Kaing Waing		
Mway Hauk	153766	Kaing Waing		
Yae Kyi Kone Su	153767	Kaing Waing		
Tha Pyay Kwin	156734	Leik Poke	16.9132°N 95.0926°E	
Kwin Lel Su	156731	Leik Poke		
Kun Chan Kone (Kwin Lel Su)	156732	Leik Poke		
Kaing Kwin	156729	Leik Poke		
Kyu Taw Yoe	156728	Leik Poke		
Dar Na Kone	156727	Leik Poke		
Leik Poke	156726	Leik Poke		
Taw Gyi	156733	Leik Poke		
Mway Hauk	156730	Leik Poke	16.9437°N 95.104°E	
Ah Kei	156010	Kyon Tar		
Kyon Tar Kone Su	156008	Kyon Tar		
Pauk Taw	156011	Kyon Tar		
Kyon Tar	156007	Kyon Tar		
Kyon Tar Hpyar	156009	Kyon Tar	16.9021°N 95.0618°E	
Lay Ein	160077	Seik Thar	16.9207°N 95.0537°E	
Ta Khun Taing	160076	Seik Thar		
Seik Thar (Kayin Su)	160075	Seik Thar	16.9206°N 95.0339°E	
Seik Thar (Myanmar Su)	160074	Seik Thar	16.9177°N 95.0317°E	
Gway Kone	150284	Ah Shey Chaung		
Ah Shey Chaung	150277	Ah Shey Chaung		
Bagan Su	150278	Ah Shey Chaung		
Tha Naung Bagan Su	150276	Ah Shey Chaung		
Ka Nyin Kone	150279	Ah Shey Chaung		
Kyar Koke	150283	Ah Shey Chaung		
Hpar Tu Byaik	150280	Ah Shey Chaung		
U Chein Kone	150281	Ah Shey Chaung		
Nyaung Kone Lay	150282	Ah Shey Chaung		
Yone Taw	163743	Yone Taw		
Thet Kei Kone	163744	Yone Taw		
Ta Laing Kone	163746	Yone Taw		
Nga Man Chaung	163745	Yone Taw		
Sin Gaung	151404	Daunt Gyi		
Tha Yet Thone Pin	151407	Daunt Gyi		
Yone Taw	151409	Daunt Gyi		
Kyar Ga Yet	151405	Daunt Gyi		
Thaung Tan	151399	Daunt Gyi		
Kun Chan Kone	151403	Daunt Gyi		
Kaing Taw Ma	151402	Daunt Gyi		
Let Pan Su	151401	Daunt Gyi		
Thet Kei Kone	151408	Daunt Gyi		
Ah Htet Yone Pin	151400	Daunt Gyi		
Daunt Gyi	151398	Daunt Gyi	16.9734°N 95.0761°E	
Kin Ma Lin Kone	151406	Daunt Gyi		
Hla Aung Chaung	163742	Yone Pin	16.9815°N 95.0442°E	
Taw Chaung	163741	Yone Pin		
Yone Pin	163740	Yone Pin	16.9897°N 95.0585°E	
Yae Twin Kone	164004	Zee Chaung		
Shin Pyan	164003	Zee Chaung		
Zee Chaung	164001	Zee Chaung	16.9934°N 95.0299°E	
Du Cha Seik	164002	Zee Chaung		
Tha Pyu Ngu	151006	Byaik Gyi		
Let Pan Kone	151010	Byaik Gyi		
Ah Shey Su	151009	Byaik Gyi		
Ya Thayt Chaung	151008	Byaik Gyi		
Ka Nyin Pin	151007	Byaik Gyi		
Byaik Gyi	151005	Byaik Gyi	16.9833°N 95°E	
Byaik Gyi Kone Su	151011	Byaik Gyi		
Lel Di	151716	Gon Min		
Ywar Thit Kone	151717	Gon Min		
Kyar Ga Yet	151718	Gon Min		
Gyoe Gyar Kwin	151715	Gon Min	16.9667°N 95°E	
Gon Min	151714	Gon Min	17.0167°N 95.0333°E	
Ohn Pin Su	151719	Gon Min		
War Taw	151720	Gon Min		
Nyaung Ngu	163449	Yae Tar Gyi		
Kaing Taw Ma	163448	Yae Tar Gyi		
Yin Taik Ngu	163447	Yae Tar Gyi		
Ah Nauk Chaung	163446	Yae Tar Gyi		
Yae Tar Gyi	163444	Yae Tar Gyi	17.0333°N 95.0833°E	
Ohn Pin Su	163445	Yae Tar Gyi		
Hteik Oke	163450	Yae Tar Gyi		
Du Cha Seik	152638	Htan Ta Pin		
Chaung Twin	152639	Htan Ta Pin		
Daunt Gyi Lay	152637	Htan Ta Pin		
Ma Gyi Pin Daunt	152636	Htan Ta Pin	16.989°N 95.0714°E	
Htan Ta Pin	152634	Htan Ta Pin		
Taung Yar Su	152635	Htan Ta Pin		
Ka Nyin Kauk	157140	Ma Gyi Pin Kwin		
Ywar Thit Kone	157137	Ma Gyi Pin Kwin		
Tha Yet Taw	157136	Ma Gyi Pin Kwin		
U Yin Tan	157135	Ma Gyi Pin Kwin		
Ah Nyar Tan	157134	Ma Gyi Pin Kwin		
Ma Gyi Pin Kwin	157133	Ma Gyi Pin Kwin	17.1309°N 95.1756°E	
Ah Su Gyi	157141	Ma Gyi Pin Kwin		
Hpa Yar Ngu	157139	Ma Gyi Pin Kwin		
Gway Kone	157138	Ma Gyi Pin Kwin		
Sauk Hmyaung	152004	Hlay Kwe La Har		
Hlay Kwe La Har	151996	Hlay Kwe La Har	17.0172°N 95.111°E	
Pein Hmyaung Gyi	152005	Hlay Kwe La Har		
Kyun Chaung	152003	Hlay Kwe La Har		
Zee Kone	152002	Hlay Kwe La Har		
Kan Nar Taw Nyo	152001	Hlay Kwe La Har		
Kone Taw Nyo	152000	Hlay Kwe La Har		
Nyaung Chaung	151999	Hlay Kwe La Har		
Ka Nyin Kone	151998	Hlay Kwe La Har		
Sar Hpyu Su	151997	Hlay Kwe La Har		
Yone Ngu Gyi	159196	Pauk Sein Peit		
Pauk Sein Peit	159193	Pauk Sein Peit	17.1503°N 95.207°E	
Kywe Gaung Yoe	159195	Pauk Sein Peit		
Yone Ngu Lay	159197	Pauk Sein Peit		
Htan Kone	159198	Pauk Sein Peit		
Byin Kyar Yoe	159194	Pauk Sein Peit		
Dar Ka Se	159706	Sa Bai Yon		
Kone Sa Bai Yon	159705	Sa Bai Yon		
Kan Nar Sa Bai Yon	159712	Sa Bai Yon		
Kyoet Chaung	159713	Sa Bai Yon		
Chauk Ein Tan	159709	Sa Bai Yon		
Kan Kone	159714	Sa Bai Yon		
Yae Twin Kone	159707	Sa Bai Yon		
Sin Chaung	159708	Sa Bai Yon		
Ma Yan Chaung	159711	Sa Bai Yon		
Tar Kone	159710	Sa Bai Yon	17.0358°N 95.1362°E	
Kin Ma Lin Kone	162346	Thea Kon		
Thea Kon	162343	Thea Kon	17.0765°N 95.1129°E	
Kyun Ka Lay	162345	Thea Kon		
Kan Kon	162344	Thea Kon		
Thet Kei Kone	163649	Yin Saing	17.0861°N 95.1441°E	
Yin Saing	163648	Yin Saing	17.0741°N 95.1485°E	
Yin Saing Wa	163651	Yin Saing		
Hnget Chaw Kwin	163650	Yin Saing		
Oe Bo (North)	158710	Oe Bo	17.0833°N 95.1833°E	
Sagging Daunt	158711	Oe Bo		
Ta Loke Su	158712	Oe Bo		
Bago Su	158713	Oe Bo		
Ga Yet	158714	Oe Bo		
Oe Bo (South)	158709	Oe Bo	17.0833°N 95.1833°E	
Thin Gan Kone	154659	Kun Chan Kone		
Mee Thway Taik (East)	154655	Kun Chan Kone	17.0856°N 95.1632°E	
Tan Lay Pin (Kywe Lan Su)	154660	Kun Chan Kone		
Thet Yin Kone	154658	Kun Chan Kone	17.1038°N 95.1595°E	
Pauk Pin Kwin	154657	Kun Chan Kone		
Kun Chan Kone	154654	Kun Chan Kone		
Mee ThwayTaik (West)	154656	Kun Chan Kone	17.0865°N 95.1605°E	
Hpa Yar Gyi Kone	164036	Zee Ngu		
Naung Bo	164035	Zee Ngu	17.1833°N 95.2167°E	
Taik Kone	164034	Zee Ngu		
Zee Ngu	164033	Zee Ngu	17.1815°N 95.2°E	
Ma Yan Kone	163141	Wet Chan Ga Yet		
Wet Chan Ga Yet (Ah Shey Su)	163142	Wet Chan Ga Yet	17.1898°N 95.1785°E	
Ka Nyin Kone	163143	Wet Chan Ga Yet	17.1683°N 95.1745°E	
Kyoe Kyar Chaung	163144	Wet Chan Ga Yet		
Wet Chan Ga Yet (Ah Nauk Su)	163140	Wet Chan Ga Yet	17.1901°N 95.174°E	
Ma Yan Kone	157024	Lu Thant Chaung		
Wet Chan Ga Yet	157022	Lu Thant Chaung		
Tha Yet Kone	157021	Lu Thant Chaung	17.201°N 95.1621°E	
Pan Pin Chaung	157023	Lu Thant Chaung		
Kyon Hpar Yoe	157019	Lu Thant Chaung		
Yae Twin Kant Lant	157018	Lu Thant Chaung		
Lu Thant Chaung	157017	Lu Thant Chaung	17.1959°N 95.1478°E	
Tar Kauk	157020	Lu Thant Chaung		
Ka Nyin Taik	157026	Lu Thant Chaung		
Kyar Inn Chaung	157025	Lu Thant Chaung		
Thone Gwa Kyan Taw	163608	Yaung Pyit Kwin		
Yaung Pyit Kwin	163601	Yaung Pyit Kwin	17.1816°N 95.1328°E	
Thone Gwa	163607	Yaung Pyit Kwin		
Ma Gyi Zin	163606	Yaung Pyit Kwin		
Kyon Hpar Yoe	163603	Yaung Pyit Kwin		
Yae Twin Kant Lant	163604	Yaung Pyit Kwin		
Hpone Soe Gyi	163602	Yaung Pyit Kwin	17.1669°N 95.1153°E	
Kyaung Su	163605	Yaung Pyit Kwin		
Gyoe Gyar Chaung Lay	159111	Pan Taw Yoe		
Gyoe Gyar Chaung Gyi	159110	Pan Taw Yoe		
Kyar Ga Yet	159109	Pan Taw Yoe		
Pan Taw Yoe (Ah Nauk Su)	159108	Pan Taw Yoe	17.1492°N 95.1573°E	
Pan Taw Yoe (Ah Shey Su)	159107	Pan Taw Yoe	17.1463°N 95.1582°E	
Let Pan Chaung	156839	Let Pan Chaung	17.0489°N 95.0488°E	
Thea Bwet	156840	Let Pan Chaung		
Chauk Ein Tan	156841	Let Pan Chaung		
Kyun Ka Lay	156842	Let Pan Chaung		
Hteik Oke	156843	Let Pan Chaung		
Tan Hlyar	156844	Let Pan Chaung		
Kyaung Su	156845	Let Pan Chaung		
Shwe Pan Ngu	160058	Seik Hpu Ni		
Seik Hpu Ni Lay	160059	Seik Hpu Ni		
Seik Hpu Ni Gyi	160056	Seik Hpu Ni		
Inn Ga Tay Chaung	160057	Seik Hpu Ni		
Kyon Hpar Yoe	155719	Kyon Hpar Yoe		
Kyein Ngu Gyi	155725	Kyon Hpar Yoe	17.15°N 95.1333°E	
Kone Ka Lay	155724	Kyon Hpar Yoe		
Than Din Aing	155723	Kyon Hpar Yoe		
Taik Kone	155722	Kyon Hpar Yoe		
Yoe Da Yar Det	155720	Kyon Hpar Yoe	17.1333°N 95.0833°E	
Kaing Chaung	155721	Kyon Hpar Yoe	17.15°N 95.1°E	
Baw Di Kone	160410	Shwe Pan Ngu		
Shwe Pan Ngu	160407	Shwe Pan Ngu		
Shwe Pan Ngu Yat Kwet Thit	160409	Shwe Pan Ngu		
Kwin Saung	160408	Shwe Pan Ngu		
Hlay Dar Chaung	153871	Kan Ka Lay	17.1167°N 95.1°E	
Kyun Taw Su	153870	Kan Ka Lay		
Yae Ma Gyi Chaung	153872	Kan Ka Lay	17.1°N 95.0833°E	
Kan Ka Lay	153868	Kan Ka Lay	17.0833°N 95.0833°E	
Myan Aung Su	153874	Kan Ka Lay		
Da None Chaung	153869	Kan Ka Lay		
Yae Twin Kone	153873	Kan Ka Lay		
Bu Tar Su	152043	Hle Seik		
Mar Lar Kwin	152042	Hle Seik		
Yone Ngu	152045	Hle Seik		
Pauk Kone	152041	Hle Seik		
Ohn Pin Su	152040	Hle Seik		
Hle Seik	152039	Hle Seik		
Ah Pin Hnit Se	152046	Hle Seik	17.0833°N 95.05°E	
Ywar Thit Kone	152044	Hle Seik		
