= Kyonpyaw District =

Kyonpyaw District ကျုံပျော်ခရိုင်
- District of Ayeyarwady Division
- Coordinates: 17°23′58″N 95°11′43″E
- Country: Myanmar
- Division: Ayeyarwady
- District: Kyonpyaw

Area
  - Total: 2,790.69 km^{2} (1,077.491 sq mi)

Population (2019)
  - Total: 623,747
  - Density: 223.510/km^{2} (578.888/sq mi)
- Time zone: UTC6:30 (MST)

Kyonpyaw District (Burmese: ကျုံပျော်ခရိုင်) is a district of the Ayeyarwady Region in Myanmar.

The Kyonpyaw District is Ayeyarwady Region's newest district formed out of three townships formerly part of Pathein District. Its main administrative GAD Office was opened on July 1, 2022 and its District court was opened on September 1, 2022. The District consists of Kyonpyaw Township, Kyaunggon Township and Yekyi Township.
