= Duya, Ayeyarwady =

Duya
- town
- Location in Burma
- Coordinates: 17°33′44″N 95°28′55″E
- Country: Burma (Myanmar)
- State: Ayeyarwady Region
- District: Hinthada District
- Township: Zalun Township
- Elevation: 16 m (52 ft)

Population
  - Religions: Buddhism
- Time zone: UTC+6.30 (MST)

Duya is a town in Zalun Township of Hinthada District in the Ayeyarwady Region of south-western Burma (Myanmar). Duya is located on the west side of Duya Lake, an oxbow lake of the Irrawaddy. It is about 10 kilometres (6.2 mi) south of Hinthada and 13 kilometres (8.1 mi) north of Zalun.
