= List of villages in Hinthada District =

The following articles contain lists of villages in Hinthada District, Burma (Myanmar):

- List of villages in Hinthada Township
- List of villages in Ingapu Township
- List of villages in Kyangin Township
- List of villages in Laymyethna Township
- List of villages in Myanaung Township
- List of villages in Zalun Township
