= Hlaingthaya–Hinthada Railway =

Railway line in Myanmar

Hlaingthaya–Hinthada Railway လှိုင်သာယာ-ဟင်္သာတ ရထားလမ်း

Overview
- Owner: Myanma Railways
- Locale: Yangon Region, Ayeyarwady Region

Operation
- Operator: Myanma Railways

Technical
- System length: 90 mi (140 km)
- Track gauge: 1,000 mm (3 ft 3 3/8 in)

Hlaingthaya (Yangon)-Hinthada Railway is a railway line operated by Myanma Railways under the Ministry of Transport and Communications. This railway connects towns on the eastern side of the Ayeyarwady River, such as Yangon (Hlaingthaya), with towns on the western side, including Nyaungdon, Sakkaw, Zalun, and Hinthada. The railway line stretches approximately 90 miles, with the journey between Yangon and Hinthada taking about six hours. Two rail services were introduced on May 24, 2014.

== History ==
The Hlaingthaya-Hinthada railway line covers a distance of 89.76 miles. It was initiated under the decision of Meeting No. 1/2010 for the Implementation of Special Projects, held on March 5, 2010, during the time of the State Peace and Development Council (SPDC) government. Construction was begun by Myanma Railways, part of the former Ministry of Rail Transportation, during the 2009-2010 fiscal year. The Hinthada-Zalun section (16.25 miles) was inaugurated on July 20, 2010, the Zalun-Nyaungdon section (46 miles) on May 23, 2013, and the Nyaungdon-Hlaingthaya section (27.75 miles) on May 24, 2014. The total cost of constructing the line amounted to 28.7 billion kyats.

== Suspension ==
Train services on this line were suspended starting from June 10, 2016, due to financial difficulties.
