= Kyangin Township =

Township in Ayeyarwady Region, Myanmar

Kyangin Township ကြံခင်းမြို့နယ်
- Township
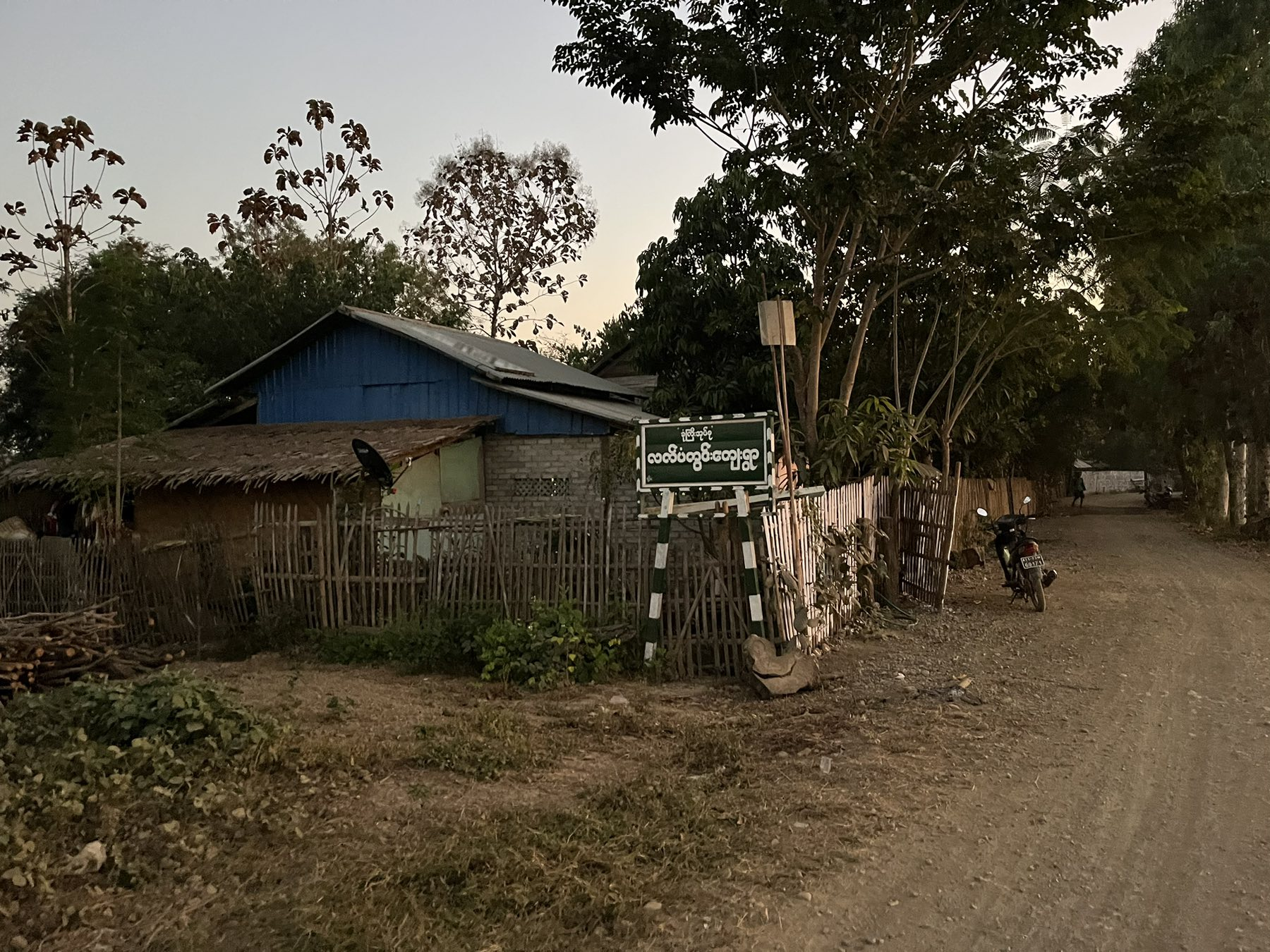
- Lat Pan Kwin village, Kyangin Township

- Location in Myanaung district
- Coordinates: 18°22′N 95°31′E
- Country: Burma
- Region: Ayeyarwady Region
- District: Myanaung District
- Capital: Kyangin

Area
  - Total: 444.59 sq mi (1,151.48 km^{2})
- Highest elevation: 3,938 ft (1,200 m)
- Lowest elevation: 50 ft (15 m)

Population (2023)
  - Total: 94,040
  - Density: 211.5/sq mi (81.67/km^{2})
  - Ethnicities: Bamar; Chin
  - Religions: Buddhism
- Time zone: UTC+6:30 (MMT)

Kyangin Township (Burmese: ကြံခင်းမြို့နယ်) is a township of Myanaung District in the northern Ayeyarwaddy Region, Myanmar. Before 2022, the township was part of Hinthada District.

Kyangin Township is the northernmost township of Ayeyarwaddy Region. Its western border with Rakhine State follows the Arakan Mountains dividing it from Taungup Township. It borders Bago Region's Pandaung Township to the north and Shwedaung Township to east with the Irrawaddy River dividing it on the eastern border. To the south, it only borders Myanaung Township within Ayeyarwady Region. The township has 2 towns: the principal town of Kyangin and the town of Batye with 3 and 2 urban wards respectively. The township additionally has 30 village tracts grouping together 251 villages.

== Geography ==
Kyangin Township's landscape is sloped with higher elevations in the north with waterways flowing southwards towards Myanaung Township and the Irrawaddy Delta. The vast majority of the townships' settlements straddle the eastern portion near the main run of the Irrawaddy River. Besides settlements on the Irrawaddy, other major waterways include the Hpatashae and Padaw streams. The western part of the township mostly consists of protected forests and hills leading up to the peaks of the Arakan Mountains. The second highest peak in Ayeyarwady Region, Mt. Myinwa, lies on the township's border with Rakhine State at 3,938 feet (1,200 m) above sea level. The pathway and flow of the Irrawaddy River within the township has significant variation from year to year based on river erosion and siltation- especially near Thauk Kyar Du village where the river splits into a few channels.

57.8% of the township's land area is protected natural areas with the primary western reserve consisting of the North Myanaung Forest Reserve and the Myinwa Mountain Forest Reserve. In the northeast, the Kyangin Forest Reserve protects areas between the Monywa-Kyangin road and the township's northeastern villages. Three smaller reserves- the Padaw Forest Reserve, the Mt. Yaenan Forest Reserve and the Golden Deer Forest Reserve- protect areas on the township's southeastern border. The Myinwa Mountain Forest reserve is used for teak plantations by the government and has been subject to illegal logging.

With various forest reserves, Kyangin Township is home to many fauna species including tigers, elephants, gaur, deer, monkeys, owls, woodpeckers, peafowl and the myna bird. The township also has a diverse array of flora from teak, bur trees, lebbek trees and mango trees to various species of bamboo, grasses and sugarcane plants.

== Demographics ==
Historical Population
Year	Kyangin Township	±%
1983	89,592	—
2014	96,083	+7.2%
2018	97,706	+1.7%
2019	97,717	+0.0%
2022	98,449	+0.7%
2023	94,040	−4.5%
Source: Census and GAD data

Kyangin Township is mostly rural with 20.4% of the population (19,209 people) living in the two urban towns of Kyangin and Batye as of 2023. The population declined between 2022 and 2023, but saw consistent growth beforehand. In 2019 the population of the township was 97,717 people.

The 2014 census showed the township having a relatively higher median age at 33.7 years of age. The township also had a 19.9% electrification rate and nearly 40% of its population using motorbikes to commute to work daily. In 1983, the population was less urbanised with only 16.1% of the township living in the then singular town of Kyangin.

== Economy and Transport ==
Kyangin township is described as a developing economy with agriculture being its primary industry. The township primarily grows rice and legumes- particularly matpe, peanuts, green beans and sesame. Mango and onion are additionally significant products of the township. The township's agricultural industry relies on exports while acting as an import-export intermediary between Yangon, Pathein Pyay and Hinthada. The township's location between Hinthada and Pyay allowed the town of Kyangin to become a river port for steamships facilitating trade. Furthermore, the village of Petye located eight miles west of Kyangin served as a starting point for a minor mountain pass providing access through the Arakan Mountains into Rakhine State.

== See also ==
- List of villages in Kyangin Township
