= Technological University, Hinthada =

Higher education institute in Ayeyarwady Region, Myanmar

Coordinates: 17°35′04″N 95°24′42″E

Technological University (Hinthada)
- နည်းပညာတက္ကသိုလ် (ဟင်္သာတ)
- Former name: Technical High School(Hinthada) Government Technological College(Hinthada)
- Type: Public
- Established: 2003; 23 years ago
- Acting Principal: Dr Soe Moe Htun
- Location: Hinthada, Ayeyarwady Region, Myanmar

The Technological University (Hinthada) in Myanmar started as Technical High School (THS) on August 1, 1977. It was located in the southern part of Tar Ngar Sge Quarter, Hinthada Township, Hinthada District, Ayeyarwady Division. It was later upgraded to Government Technological College (GTC). The College was moved to the present University on April 21, 2003.

During the 2015/2016 academic year, the total numbers of students attending at TU (Hinthata) was 1,500.

== Departments ==
- Department of Civil engineering
- Department of Electronic and communication
- Department of Electrical power
- Department of Mechanical engineering
- Academic Department

== Degrees offered ==
1. Bachelor of Engineering
2. Bachelor of Technology
3. Associateship of Government Technical Institute

== Courses ==
- Civil Engineering
- Electronic and Communication Engineering
- Electrical Power Engineering
- Mechanical Engineering

== See also ==
- List of universities in Myanmar
