= Kyangin =

Kyangin ကြံခင်းမြို့
- Town
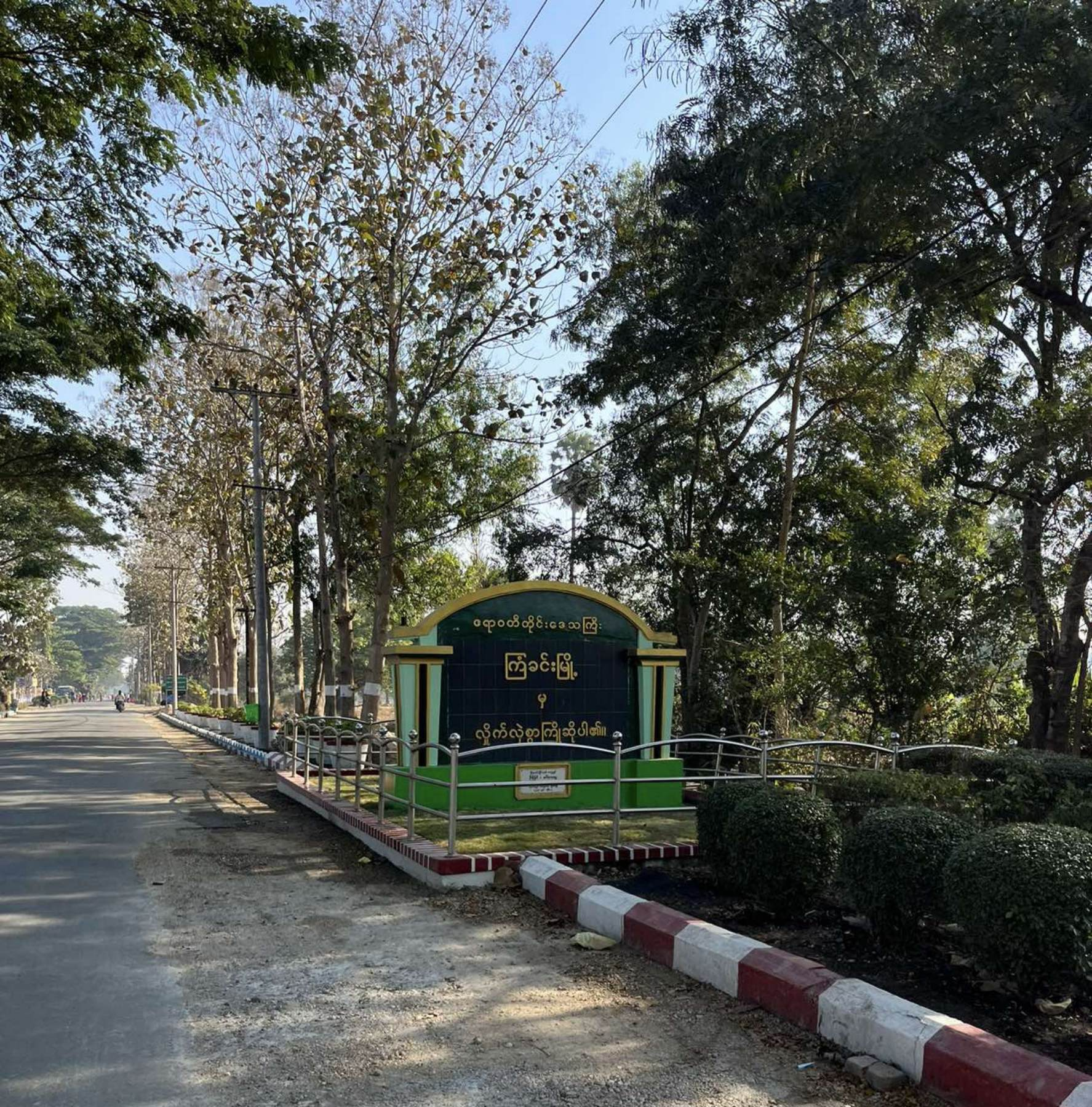
- Kyangin Town sign
- Interactive map of Kyangin
- Coordinates: 18.335°N 95.239°E
- Country: Myanmar
- Region: Ayeyarwady Region
- District: Myanaung District
- Township: Kyangin Township

Area
  - Total: 3.58 sq mi (9.3 km^{2})

Population (1983)
  - Total: 13,984
  - Density: 3,910/sq mi (1,510/km^{2})
- Time zone: UTC+6:30 (MMT)

Kyangin (Burmese: ကြံခင်းမြို့) is a town in northern Ayeyarwady Region, south-west Myanmar. It is the seat of the Kyangin Township in the Myanaung District. The town is located on the western bank of the Irrawaddy River in the eastern part of its township and has 3 urban wards.

== History ==
The town was first settled in 1250 by the Mon people. In 1753, during the Konbaung Dynasty, the area was supplanted by mostly Bamar people. The name Kyangin comes from its original Mon name ကျာကင်း (Krakeng) translating to mean either crocodile guard or crocodile tax-office.

The town was incorporated in 1780 (1150 Myanmar Era) and placed under the regional control of Thrarrawddy before becoming receiving its own myoza in 1829. In 1886, the municipal government of Kyangin was incorporated during British rule in Burma. In the 20th century, Kyangin was a steamship port due to its location on the Irrawaddy between the cities of Hinthada and Pyay

== Demographics ==
Historical Population
Year	Kyangin	±%
1954	6,040	—
1983	13,984	+131.5%
2019	<19,504	—
2023	<19,823	—
Source: Census and GAD data

The 1954 census recorded 6,040 people in the town of Kyangin. In 1983, the town of Kyangin had 13,984 people.

The 2014 Myanmar census record 19,504 people living in the two towns of Kyangin Township- Kyangin and Batye. In 2019, the General Administration Department reported 19,823 total in the two towns. In 2023, the GAD reported that the two towns' population had shrunk to 19,209.
