= Danubyu Township =

Danubyu Township ဓနုဖြူမြို့နယ်
- Township
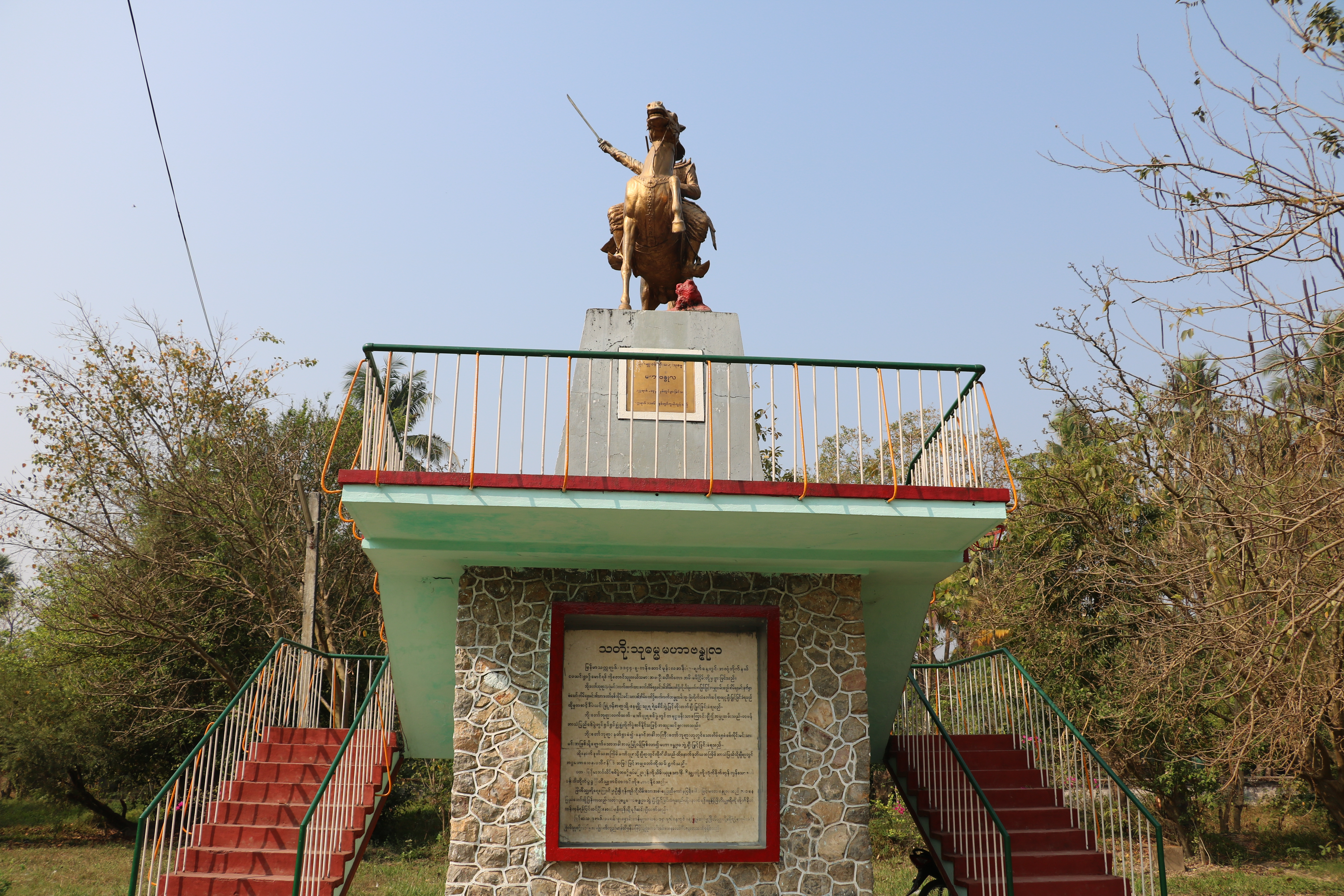

- Location in Maubin district
- Coordinates: 17°22′N 95°27′E
- Country: Myanmar
- Region: Ayeyarwady Region
- District: Maubin
- Capital: Danubyu

Area
  - Total: 289.35 sq mi (749.4 km^{2})
- Elevation: 28.05 ft (8.55 m)

Population (2019)
  - Total: 195,968
  - Density: 677.27/sq mi (261.50/km^{2})
  - Ethnicities: Bamar; Kayin
  - Religions: Buddhism
- Time zone: UTC+6:30 (MMT)

Danubyu Township (Burmese: ဓနုဖြူမြို့နယ်), also spelt Danuphyu and formerly as Donabyu, is a township of Maubin District in the Ayeyarwady Region of Burma (Myanmar). Danubyu Township is known as the death place of the general Maha Bandula at Danubyu Fort effectively ending the First Anglo-Burmese War by forcing the Burmese to surrender to the British.

The Township consists of 1 town, 18 wards, 63 village groups and 449 villages and spans over the Irrawaddy River. The Township is named after its capital, Danubyu, which is split into 18 wards. It is bordered to the north by the Hinthada District with Zalun Township for most of the northern boundary with Hinthada Township for a small section to the northwest. To its west, it borders Kyonpyaw Township of the Pathein District. Pantanaw Township in the southwest and Nyaungdon Township in the southeast form the southern border within Maubin District. Danubyu Township has an eastern border with Yangon Region and its Hlegu Township.

== Geography ==
Danubyu Township is a largely flat township without any hills or mountains located in eastern Ayeyarwady Region. 17 miles of the Irrawaddy River runs through the Township as its main feature from north to south. The Township has two major river embankment dams to control flooding on the Irrawaddy. This section of the river is navigable by all vessels. The Township sees intensive land use and has virtually no wild animals and natural preserves. Tree species in the area include lebbek trees, bur trees and white siris trees.

The Township is located in a hot tropical zone with a heavy monsoon presence. Compared to other townships, Danubyu has a higher temperature various with average highs and lows range between 43 °C and 17 °C, respectively. Between 2016 and 2019, the average year sees 95 days of rain with an average rainfall of 83.5 inches (212 cm) per year.

== History ==
In December 1824, the Konbaung dynasty general Maha Bandula retreated to Danubyu after being forced to retreat from Yangon during the First Anglo-Burmese War. He quickly built a fort using local trees and built up a strong stockade with 10,000 troops. When the British arrived in early 1825, they started a siege but was unable to break through Bandula's defences after a few months despite their superior weaponry. Bandula attempted a counter-charge with elephant cavalry to relieve the siege but failed. On April 1, a stray mortar landed on Bandula while he was out in the open against the advice of his generals to boost morale.

Gen. Maha Bandula’s cemetery and monument statue is situated in the township. Danubyu Fort itself was a prominent location of the war until it was destroyed by a flood.

On 4 February 1853, the British were repulsed by an ambush near Danubyu while attempting to clear rebels contesting lands claimed during the Second Anglo-Burmese War.

== Demographics and Economy ==
Historical Population
Year	Kyonpyaw Township	±%
2014	179,353	—
2018	190,228	+6.1%
2019	190,811	+0.3%
2022	192,150	+0.7%
2023	195,968	+2.0%
Source: Ministry of Labor, Immigration, and Population and General Administration Department data

The population is largely rural with 87.7% of the total population in 2019 lived in rural areas. Besides Danubyu, other settlements include Zagagyi and Kyaung Su. The average household size was 4.3 people in 2019. 92.18% of the total population adhere to Buddhism while 6.4% of the population were Christians.

Agriculture is the primary industry of the Township with a total of 121,774 acres (492.8 km^{2}) of farmland. The main crop farmed is rice, with significant beans, pulse, corn and mango also being farmed. There are also poultry and pig husbandry in the township. Agriculture is largely unmechanized with only 5,776 Harvesters privately owned in the Township in 2019. After agriculture, the next industries employing the most people in Danubyu Township are Water-related industries and Sales. Fisheries and freshwater prawn farms are also important within the Township.

The average income in the 2018-2019 fiscal year was 940,967 kyats (roughly US$635 by 2019 conversion rates).

== Notable people ==
10th president of Myanmar Win Myint was born in Nyaungchaung, Danubyu Township in 1945.

Famous 20th century Burmese dance actor Po Sein's father was San Dun of Danubyu, himself a well-known performer

== List of Village Tracts ==
The following are Danubyu Township's 62 village tracts in the township, which group together 451 legally recognised villages as of 2024.

- Ah Kyaw
- Ah La Myo
- Byin Bwe
- Byin Nyar (Middle)
- Byin Nyar (East)
- Chaung Sauk
- Hne Kyoe
- Hpan Khar Kwin
- Hpone Soe (South)
- Hti Kwayt
- Htone Pon
- Inn Ga Lar
- Inn Yat
- Kan Nu Gyi
- Kan Nu Ka Lay
- Ka Zun Kwin
- Kat Kho
- Kone Tan (North)
- Kone Tan (South)
- Kyon Ta Nee
- La Man
- Let Pan Zin Kone
- Let Swea Chaung
- Lin Lun Pin
- Nan Taw Kone
- Nga Bat Aing
- Nga Ni (South)
- Nga Pyin Chaung
- Nyaung Chaung
- Ohn Pin Kwin
- Pa Kun
- Paing Sun Nan
- Pet Tan (Htaik Ka Lay)
- Pyin Ka Thar
- Sa Kar Gyi
- Sa Khan Gyi
- San Kin
- Set Tu Chaung Ka Lay
- Shan Su
- Sin Lan Gyi
- Sin Lan Ka Lay
- Sit Kwin (South)
- Ta Myar
- Taw Gyi (North)
- Taw Gyi (Zee Hpyu Kone)
- Taw Kwe
- Tha Baw Tha Pyu
- Tha Pyay Yoe
- Tha Pyu
- Tha Pyu Pin
- Thar Aye Daunt
- Thea Hpyu (North)
- Yae Kyi
- Yae Le
- Yae Pauk
- Yae Twin Kone
- Yone Chaung
- Za Loke Gyi
