= List of villages in Kyangin Township =

This is a list of villages in Kyangin Township, Hinthada District, Ayeyarwady Region, Burma (Myanmar).

Village	Village code	Village tract	Coordinates (links to map & photo sources)	Notes
Za Yat Kone	160897	Ta Laing Kwin	18.3101°N 95.2548°E	
Tha Pyay Pin Zin	160889	Ta Laing Kwin	18.3339°N 95.2255°E	
Pauk Taw	160890	Ta Laing Kwin	18.329°N 95.2406°E	
Pa Yan Su	160891	Ta Laing Kwin	18.3326°N 95.2353°E	
Myauk Inn Taing	160892	Ta Laing Kwin	18.3354°N 95.2333°E	
Kyun Su	160893	Ta Laing Kwin		
Inn Te Su	160894	Ta Laing Kwin		
Ma Gyi Pin Kwin Daunt	160896	Ta Laing Kwin	18.31°N 95.2622°E	
Ta Laing Kwin	160888	Ta Laing Kwin	18.3289°N 95.2346°E	
Aung Myin Taing	160895	Ta Laing Kwin	18.3194°N 95.2595°E	
Oke Twin	154758	Kwayt Ma	18.2949°N 95.2257°E	
Kwayt Ma	154754	Kwayt Ma	18.2975°N 95.2485°E	
Nga Pi Su	154755	Kwayt Ma	18.2954°N 95.2433°E	
Nyaung Pin Te	154756	Kwayt Ma	18.2981°N 95.2408°E	
Oke Hpo	154762	Kwayt Ma	18.3054°N 95.2513°E	
Kyaung Su	154761	Kwayt Ma	18.2809°N 95.2272°E	
Hnget Pyaw Taw	154760	Kwayt Ma	18.2838°N 95.2304°E	
Kan Pyo	154759	Kwayt Ma	18.289°N 95.2284°E	
Chaung Gwa	154757	Kwayt Ma	18.2951°N 95.2355°E	
Inn Kauk	153268	Ka Loet Kwin	18.2999°N 95.1778°E	
Pay Taw	153263	Ka Loet Kwin	18.2996°N 95.1813°E	
Ka Loet Ah Shey Kone	153266	Ka Loet Kwin	18.3107°N 95.1647°E	
Kyi	153267	Ka Loet Kwin	18.2999°N 95.1683°E	
Nyaung Kone	153265	Ka Loet Kwin	18.3036°N 95.1705°E	
Ka Loet Kwin (West)	153262	Ka Loet Kwin	18.3133°N 95.1561°E	
Kwin Hla	153264	Ka Loet Kwin	18.2916°N 95.1873°E	
Pan Pin Kone	153271	Ka Loet Kwin	18.3119°N 95.1541°E	
Myauk Kone	153270	Ka Loet Kwin		
Kyoet Kone	153269	Ka Loet Kwin	18.3172°N 95.146°E	
Kone Myint	162306	Thea Hpyu	18.3053°N 95.2003°E	
Thea Hpyu	162302	Thea Hpyu	18.3164°N 95.2139°E	
Min Te (North)	162303	Thea Hpyu		
Min Te Ka Lay	162304	Thea Hpyu	18.3074°N 95.2141°E	
Nan Lone Kyaing	162305	Thea Hpyu	18.3143°N 95.2093°E	
Moke Htoke	160412	Shwe Pan Taw	18.3005°N 95.2096°E	
Ma Yan Cho	160416	Shwe Pan Taw	18.2807°N 95.2161°E	
Kan Kone	160417	Shwe Pan Taw	18.2945°N 95.2001°E	
Wea Gyi	160418	Shwe Pan Taw	18.2869°N 95.207°E	
Htan Kone	160414	Shwe Pan Taw	18.294°N 95.2114°E	
Shwe Pan Taw	160411	Shwe Pan Taw	18.2889°N 95.1995°E	
Min Te Gyi	160413	Shwe Pan Taw	18.2966°N 95.2149°E	
Wea Gyi (Auk Su)	160415	Shwe Pan Taw	18.2825°N 95.2083°E	
Thea Hpyu Ywar Thit	151244	Chin Myaung	18.3174°N 95.2139°E	
Gyoe Gyar Tan	151240	Chin Myaung	18.3284°N 95.2035°E	
Kyoet Kone	151241	Chin Myaung	18.3213°N 95.2139°E	
Chin Myaung	151243	Chin Myaung	18.3125°N 95.1956°E	
Hpa Yar Ni Taung	151242	Chin Myaung	18.3136°N 95.1976°E	
Kyan Taw	155086	Kyan Taw	18.2723°N 95.2386°E	
Kyauk Taing	155095	Kyan Taw	18.2798°N 95.2308°E	
Koe Taung Ywar Thit	155092	Kyan Taw	18.266°N 95.2276°E	
La Maing Kwin	155090	Kyan Taw	18.2619°N 95.2153°E	
Koe Taung Ywar Ma	155091	Kyan Taw	18.2683°N 95.2318°E	
Yae Thauk Kan	155087	Kyan Taw	18.2703°N 95.214°E	
Htauk Kyant Kone	155093	Kyan Taw	18.2766°N 95.2458°E	
Tar Su	155094	Kyan Taw	18.282°N 95.2374°E	
Lein Khon	155089	Kyan Taw	18.2788°N 95.2241°E	
Taik Gyi	155088	Kyan Taw	18.2788°N 95.2185°E	
Auk Pa Taw	155096	Kyan Taw	18.2817°N 95.2064°E	
Pyayt Zin Kwin	155097	Kyan Taw	18.2685°N 95.2482°E	
Myauk Chaw Kone	155098	Kyan Taw	18.2569°N 95.2376°E	
Inn Pet Let	159371	Pet Ma Khan	18.2323°N 95.21°E	
Shwe Laung Kone	159370	Pet Ma Khan	18.2429°N 95.2144°E	
La Maing Kwin	159368	Pet Ma Khan	18.2616°N 95.2148°E	
Thea Kaw	159367	Pet Ma Khan	18.2547°N 95.2156°E	
Kyat Khaung	159366	Pet Ma Khan	18.2335°N 95.2301°E	
Yin Taik Kone	159365	Pet Ma Khan	18.2355°N 95.2178°E	
Pet Ma Khan	159364	Pet Ma Khan	18.2375°N 95.2155°E	
Pet Ma Khan (Myauk Kone)	159369	Pet Ma Khan	18.2498°N 95.2184°E	
Aung Pan Kone	162199	Thauk Kyar Du	18.463°N 95.1494°E	
Thauk Kyar Du	162192	Thauk Kyar Du	18.4929°N 95.1277°E	
Kyaung Kone	162193	Thauk Kyar Du	18.4848°N 95.1347°E	
Pyar Thar su	162194	Thauk Kyar Du	18.4883°N 95.1323°E	
Kyauk Myaung	162195	Thauk Kyar Du	18.4838°N 95.1031°E	
Kun Ohn Su Ywar Thit	162197	Thauk Kyar Du		
Kyun Kone	162198	Thauk Kyar Du	18.4674°N 95.1434°E	
Kyun Pu Lu	162200	Thauk Kyar Du		
Kayin Su	162196	Thauk Kyar Du	18.482°N 95.1357°E	
Yae Lel Kyun (Auk Kone)	163343	Yae Lel Kyun	18.4715°N 95.1563°E	
Yae Lel Kyun (Ah Htet Kone)	163342	Yae Lel Kyun	18.4743°N 95.1761°E	
Nwar Te	152641	Htan Ta Pin	18.459°N 95.1443°E	
Htan Ta Pin	152640	Htan Ta Pin	18.4553°N 95.1556°E	
Gyoe Hpyu	152642	Htan Ta Pin	18.4464°N 95.118°E	
Yae Wun Gyi	152643	Htan Ta Pin	18.4398°N 95.1699°E	
U To	152646	Htan Ta Pin	18.4549°N 95.1185°E	
Nan Kat	152645	Htan Ta Pin	18.4333°N 95.174°E	
In Pin San	152644	Htan Ta Pin	18.4296°N 95.1577°E	
Yae Hmein San	152647	Htan Ta Pin	18.459°N 95.1086°E	
Myay Char	160727	Son Le	18.3679°N 95.1956°E	
Thit Seint Kone	160728	Son Le	18.3824°N 95.1959°E	
Dambi	160722	Son Le	18.3946°N 95.1943°E	
Thea Hpyu	160726	Son Le	18.391°N 95.1739°E	
Pauk Taing	160725	Son Le	18.3879°N 95.1975°E	
Shan Su	160724	Son Le	18.3938°N 95.1966°E	
Son Le	160716	Son Le	18.3928°N 95.1808°E	
Kyaung Kone	160717	Son Le	18.4111°N 95.1889°E	
Myaung	160718	Son Le	18.4063°N 95.1851°E	
Seik Thar	160719	Son Le	18.4154°N 95.1901°E	
Tha Pyay Hla	160720	Son Le	18.3962°N 95.1932°E	
Ywar Thit Kone	160721	Son Le	18.4049°N 95.1938°E	
Si Son Kone	160723	Son Le	18.3926°N 95.1949°E	
Pauk Taing Kyun Gyi	160730	Son Le	18.378°N 95.2054°E	
Oe Bo Kone	160729	Son Le	18.3826°N 95.1999°E	
Chaung Hpyar	155264	Kyat Kha Lay	18.3965°N 95.1553°E	
Ah Lel	155261	Kyat Kha Lay	18.3944°N 95.1611°E	
San Gyi	155263	Kyat Kha Lay	18.3964°N 95.1733°E	
Kyat Kha Lay	155260	Kyat Kha Lay	18.3925°N 95.1649°E	
Shan Taw Gyi	155262	Kyat Kha Lay	18.4016°N 95.1676°E	
Oke Pon (Auk Su)	157439	Me Kone	18.3602°N 95.2002°E	
Nyaung Chay Htauk	157438	Me Kone	18.3477°N 95.1977°E	
Me Kone	157435	Me Kone	18.3511°N 95.1977°E	
Me Kone Kyun	157437	Me Kone	18.3632°N 95.207°E	
Oke Pon	157436	Me Kone	18.3593°N 95.1974°E	
Shan Taung	153687	Ka Zin Gyi	18.341°N 95.2278°E	
Gyoe Gyar Tan	153686	Ka Zin Gyi	18.3321°N 95.2048°E	
Kan Ka Lay Kyaung Taik	153691	Ka Zin Gyi		
Than Ba Yar Inn Gyi	153688	Ka Zin Gyi	18.3403°N 95.2132°E	
Ka Zin Gyi	153685	Ka Zin Gyi	18.3396°N 95.2042°E	
Kyat Kone	153689	Ka Zin Gyi		
Than Ba Yar Inn Lay	153690	Ka Zin Gyi	18.3405°N 95.2237°E	
Than Ba Yar Kwin	158883	Oke Twin	18.2714°N 95.1533°E	
Oke Twin	158875	Oke Twin	18.2932°N 95.1755°E	
That Yet Khon	158876	Oke Twin	18.2563°N 95.1738°E	
Lel Gyi Kwin	158877	Oke Twin	18.2765°N 95.176°E	
Taw	158878	Oke Twin	18.2925°N 95.1698°E	
Tha Yet Pin Kwin	158879	Oke Twin	18.2911°N 95.1832°E	
Ah Htet Pan Taw	158880	Oke Twin	18.2787°N 95.1983°E	
San Kone	158882	Oke Twin	18.2665°N 95.1969°E	
Ka Nyin Chaung	158881	Oke Twin	18.2707°N 95.1853°E	
Bet Ye	150817	Bet Ye	18.3005°N 95.1471°E	
Tar Gyi Tan	150825	Bet Ye	18.2856°N 95.1285°E	
Let Pan Taik	150822	Bet Ye	18.2936°N 95.1486°E	
Thit Seint Pin	150818	Bet Ye	18.2949°N 95.1567°E	
Ma Gyi Su	150821	Bet Ye	18.2931°N 95.1437°E	
Nyaung Pin	150820	Bet Ye	18.2904°N 95.1658°E	
Koe Inn	150824	Bet Ye	18.2949°N 95.1393°E	
Lu Pyo Taw (Ah Htet Su)	150823	Bet Ye	18.2927°N 95.1539°E	
Lu Pyo Taw (Auk Su)	150819	Bet Ye	18.2925°N 95.1576°E	
Ka Nyin Taw	150826	Bet Ye	18.2878°N 95.1493°E	
Kyet Shar Zun	155174	Kyar Inn	18.2957°N 95.1336°E	
Shar Zee Bo	155175	Kyar Inn	18.2802°N 95.1094°E	
Kan Se	155173	Kyar Inn	18.3015°N 95.1111°E	
Koe Pin	155172	Kyar Inn	18.2942°N 95.107°E	
Tha Yet Taw	155171	Kyar Inn	18.3015°N 95.0892°E	
Kyat Kwin	155170	Kyar Inn	18.3111°N 95.1155°E	
Kyar Inn	155169	Kyar Inn	18.311°N 95.0937°E	
Ah Lon (South)	150214	Ah Lon	18.3494°N 95.0742°E	
Kyar Inn	150208	Ah Lon	18.3573°N 95.0787°E	
Kan Pyo	150213	Ah Lon	18.3448°N 95.0822°E	
Ywar Thit Gyi	150211	Ah Lon	18.3404°N 95.0869°E	
Ywar Thit Ka Lay	150212	Ah Lon	18.3543°N 95.0716°E	
Shar Bo	150209	Ah Lon	18.3515°N 95.083°E	
Htone Te Su	150207	Ah Lon	18.3358°N 95.0914°E	
Ah Lon (Myauk Su)	150206	Ah Lon	18.352°N 95.073°E	
Pauk Tu	150210	Ah Lon	18.3469°N 95.086°E	
Let Pan Taik	154345	Khon Gyi	18.3093°N 95.0666°E	
Chin Tha Hpan Pin	154340	Khon Gyi	18.2986°N 95.0615°E	
Lel Ma	154339	Khon Gyi	18.3019°N 95.0507°E	
Khon Gyi	154338	Khon Gyi	18.3074°N 95.0507°E	
Let Pan Kwin	154342	Khon Gyi	18.2882°N 95.0568°E	
Kyaw Ngon	154344	Khon Gyi	18.2909°N 95.0729°E	
Nyaung Pin	154341	Khon Gyi	18.2989°N 95.0585°E	
Myanmar Tha Hpan Pin	154346	Khon Gyi	18.3102°N 95.0717°E	
Myaung Gyi	154347	Khon Gyi	18.3078°N 95.085°E	
Ah Lel	154348	Khon Gyi	18.308°N 95.0773°E	
San Hmyaung	154349	Khon Gyi	18.3388°N 95.0617°E	
Ma Gyi Pin Kwin	154350	Khon Gyi	18.2984°N 95.0745°E	
Son Ton	154343	Khon Gyi	18.2905°N 95.0617°E	
Kywe Te	159317	Pein Hne Kwin	18.2484°N 95.1521°E	
San Gyi	159314	Pein Hne Kwin	18.2438°N 95.1727°E	
Sit Kwin	159315	Pein Hne Kwin	18.2517°N 95.1658°E	
Sa Khan Gyi	159318	Pein Hne Kwin	18.2107°N 95.1789°E	
Pein Hne Kwin	159313	Pein Hne Kwin	18.254°N 95.1655°E	
Kywet Nwe Kwin	159316	Pein Hne Kwin	18.2573°N 95.153°E	
Gway Tauk Kone	163353	Yae Nan Taung	18.1803°N 95.1675°E	
Yae Nan Taung	163350	Yae Nan Taung	18.2081°N 95.1441°E	
Nyaung Waing	163356	Yae Nan Taung	18.1852°N 95.1246°E	
Kwin Yar Gyi	163357	Yae Nan Taung	18.2167°N 95.1492°E	
Yae Ngan	163354	Yae Nan Taung	18.1952°N 95.1549°E	
Kyi Taing Kwin	163352	Yae Nan Taung	18.1813°N 95.1524°E	
Ka Du Khon	163351	Yae Nan Taung	18.1997°N 95.1424°E	
Nyaung Kone	163360	Yae Nan Taung	18.1887°N 95.1177°E	
Thein Kone	163359	Yae Nan Taung	18.2153°N 95.1308°E	
Kwin Yar Lay	163358	Yae Nan Taung	18.2131°N 95.1439°E	
Let Pan Khon	163355	Yae Nan Taung	18.203°N 95.1457°E	
Le War Kwin	160279	Shauk Khon	18.2802°N 95.1179°E	
Myin Thar	160278	Shauk Khon	18.2769°N 95.1116°E	
Shauk Khon	160277	Shauk Khon	18.2713°N 95.0985°E	
Sa Par Oe (Ah Nauk Kone)	159181	Pauk Nwe San	18.1975°N 95.0806°E	
Myanmar Su	159187	Pauk Nwe San	18.2329°N 95.1076°E	
Kan	159185	Pauk Nwe San	18.2414°N 95.0737°E	
Me Za Li	159184	Pauk Nwe San	18.2163°N 95.0792°E	
Auk Kyin Su	159182	Pauk Nwe San	18.1911°N 95.0925°E	
Pauk Nwe San	159180	Pauk Nwe San	18.2289°N 95.1071°E	
San	159183	Pauk Nwe San	18.2188°N 95.0768°E	
Tha Yet Taw	159186	Pauk Nwe San	18.2202°N 95.1065°E	
Oke Shit Kone	162670	Thit Seint Kaing	18.3546°N 95.0616°E	
San Myaung	162669	Thit Seint Kaing	18.3391°N 95.0625°E	
Tat Khon	162668	Thit Seint Kaing	18.3553°N 95.0446°E	
Thit Seint Kaing	162667	Thit Seint Kaing	18.3533°N 95.0534°E	
Kyar Inn Lay	154633	Kun Ait Kone		
Kun Ait Kone	154631	Kun Ait Kone	18.318°N 95.0885°E	
Thar Yar Kone	154634	Kun Ait Kone	18.3131°N 95.0739°E	
Pin Ka Taing	154635	Kun Ait Kone	18.3326°N 95.094°E	
Gway Cho	154636	Kun Ait Kone	18.3193°N 95.1029°E	
Yae Lel Kyin	154632	Kun Ait Kone	18.3337°N 95.1018°E	
Wun Htauk Kwin	154638	Kun Ait Kone	18.3368°N 95.0942°E	
Boe Khaung Kwin	154639	Kun Ait Kone	18.3119°N 95.0658°E	
Thar Paung	154637	Kun Ait Kone	18.3136°N 95.1046°E	
Pay Kone Lay	164042	Zee Pin Kwin	18.332°N 95.1385°E	
Oke Pon (Ah Shey Su)	164047	Zee Pin Kwin	18.3183°N 95.1323°E	
Oke Pon (Taung Su)	164046	Zee Pin Kwin	18.322°N 95.1248°E	
Oke Pon (Myauk Su)	164045	Zee Pin Kwin	18.326°N 95.1252°E	
Pay Kone Gyi	164044	Zee Pin Kwin	18.3289°N 95.1378°E	
Hnaw Kone	164043	Zee Pin Kwin	18.332°N 95.1344°E	
Zee Pin Kwin	164040	Zee Pin Kwin	18.3404°N 95.1279°E	
Kayin Kone	164041	Zee Pin Kwin	18.3346°N 95.1449°E	
Wet Lu	154842	Kwin Gyi	18.2256°N 95.1469°E	
Hman Kwin	154843	Kwin Gyi	18.236°N 95.1417°E	
Than Oe Kin	154844	Kwin Gyi	18.2443°N 95.1287°E	
Kwin Gyi	154841	Kwin Gyi	18.2629°N 95.139°E	
Oke Pon	154845	Kwin Gyi	18.2353°N 95.1504°E	
Poe Su Gyi	159428	Poe Su Gyi	18.1612°N 95.0828°E	
Chin Ywar Gyi	159433	Poe Su Gyi	18.1762°N 95.1198°E	
Htein Pin Myaung (Auk su)	159432	Poe Su Gyi	18.1679°N 95.1167°E	
Auk Kyin Su	159434	Poe Su Gyi	18.1903°N 95.0871°E	
Htein Pin Myaung	159431	Poe Su Gyi	18.1663°N 95.1031°E	
Be Pyar	159430	Poe Su Gyi	18.1488°N 95.1076°E	
Sa Par Oe	159429	Poe Su Gyi	18.1971°N 95.0906°E	
Kan	155618	Kyoet Pin Su	18.2458°N 95.0808°E	
Htan Pin Kone	155617	Kyoet Pin Su	18.2458°N 95.0713°E	
Kaing Thar	155619	Kyoet Pin Su	18.2686°N 95.0855°E	
Kyauk Pa Sat	155620	Kyoet Pin Su	18.2529°N 95.0476°E	
Lel Kya	155621	Kyoet Pin Su	18.2701°N 95.0587°E	
Kyoet Pin Su	155616	Kyoet Pin Su	18.2439°N 95.0641°E	
