= List of villages in Hinthada Township =

This is a list of villages in Hinthada Township, Hinthada District, Ayeyarwady Region, Myanmar.

Village	Village code	Village tract	Coordinates (links to map & photo sources)	Notes
Neik Ban	158161	Neik Ban	17.5373°N 95.3548°E	
Nga Bat Inn (West)	158163	Neik Ban	17.5413°N 95.3477°E	
Nga Bat Inn (East)	158162	Neik Ban	17.5435°N 95.3543°E	
Kan Gyi Daunt	158172	Neik Ban	17.5339°N 95.361°E	
Ah Nyar Su	158173	Neik Ban		
Yoe Gyi	158164	Neik Ban	17.5505°N 95.3454°E	
Me Za Li Yat And Than Pa Yar Inn	158165	Neik Ban		
Me Za Li (East)	158166	Neik Ban		
Shin Pin Thar Hlyaung	158167	Neik Ban	17.5309°N 95.352°E	
Me Za Li Taw	158170	Neik Ban	17.5234°N 95.3497°E	
Lay Pyit Kone	158171	Neik Ban	17.5338°N 95.3471°E	
La Har Pa Ni	158168	Neik Ban	17.619°N 95.242°E	
Bu Tar Kwin	158169	Neik Ban	17.5427°N 95.3628°E	
Ohn Pin Su	153755	Kaing Taw Kwin	17.5899°N 95.3684°E	
Ohn Kone	153756	Kaing Taw Kwin	17.5814°N 95.3788°E	
La Tar Ka	153757	Kaing Taw Kwin		
Kaing Taw Kwin	153753	Kaing Taw Kwin	17.5809°N 95.3664°E	
Kan Ka Lay	153758	Kaing Taw Kwin		
Ku Lar Khat	153759	Kaing Taw Kwin		
Ta Paing Su	153754	Kaing Taw Kwin	17.5851°N 95.3679°E	
Ka Nyin Kwin	164078	Zoke Ka Ni	17.5916°N 95.3483°E	
Zoke Ka Ni	164077	Zoke Ka Ni	17.5821°N 95.3524°E	
Ywar Thit Kone	164079	Zoke Ka Ni	17.5844°N 95.3492°E	
Tha Yet Oke	161920	Tha Yet Oke	17.5805°N 95.3303°E	
Tha Yet Oke Kan Ka Lay	161921	Tha Yet Oke		
That Yet Oke Gyi	161922	Tha Yet Oke		
Pyar Ka Tat	155387	Kyaung Kwin		
Baw Di Kone	155386	Kyaung Kwin	17.5631°N 95.3783°E	
Kan Su	155385	Kyaung Kwin	17.5679°N 95.3669°E	
Boe Thu Taw Kwin	155384	Kyaung Kwin	17.5488°N 95.369°E	
Nyaung Au Pauk	155383	Kyaung Kwin	17.5617°N 95.3684°E	
Kun Chan Kone	155381	Kyaung Kwin	17.5508°N 95.3627°E	
Kyaung Kwin	155380	Kyaung Kwin	17.5524°N 95.3816°E	
Nyaung Pin Gyi	155382	Kyaung Kwin	17.5584°N 95.3707°E	
Auk Su	162122	Thar Si		
Ywar Thit Kone	162130	Thar Si		
Sut Ta Yar	162129	Thar Si	17.5°N 95.4167°E	
Pwe Sar Su	162128	Thar Si		
Nyaung Kone	162127	Thar Si		
Sin Lu Lay	162126	Thar Si		
Tha Yet Chaung	162125	Thar Si		
Moe Goke Kyauk Su	162123	Thar Si		
Thar Si Thu Gyi Ah Su	162121	Thar Si		
Thar Si	162120	Thar Si	17.5413°N 95.4232°E	
Ta Par War	162124	Thar Si		
Pyar Ka Tet (Taung Su)	159494	Pyar Ka Tat	17.5576°N 95.4085°E	
Pyar Ka Tet (Ah Shey Su)	159493	Pyar Ka Tat	17.562°N 95.4108°E	
Pyar Ka Tet (Ah Nauk Su)	159492	Pyar Ka Tat	17.5616°N 95.4059°E	
Kha Nwe	159496	Pyar Ka Tat	17.5392°N 95.4065°E	
Moe Goke	159497	Pyar Ka Tat	17.5311°N 95.4001°E	
Thaung Ngu	159498	Pyar Ka Tat	17.5446°N 95.4215°E	
Sa Bai Kwin	159495	Pyar Ka Tat	17.551°N 95.4055°E	
Ta Dar U	160815	Ta Dar U	17.531°N 95.3879°E	
Lay Tu Ywar Thit	160819	Ta Dar U	17.5315°N 95.3922°E	
U To	160816	Ta Dar U	17.5428°N 95.3916°E	
Thone Gwa	160817	Ta Dar U	17.5342°N 95.3842°E	
Ta Dar U (East)	160818	Ta Dar U	17.5367°N 95.387°E	
Kha Yu Chaung	160484	Si Taw Kone	17.5261°N 95.3636°E	
Nyaung Kone	160483	Si Taw Kone	17.5058°N 95.3797°E	
Si Taw Kone	160482	Si Taw Kone	17.51°N 95.3721°E	
Zee Kone	218575	Si Taw Kone	17.5165°N 95.3690°E	
Nat Win Kone	163709	Yoe Gyi	17.5687°N 95.3512°E	
Kayin Kwin	163706	Yoe Gyi	17.5765°N 95.3475°E	
Yoe Gyi	163705	Yoe Gyi	17.5584°N 95.3377°E	
Hpa Lan Taung Hmway Kone	163707	Yoe Gyi	17.5701°N 95.3602°E	
Pyay Taw Thar Kone	163708	Yoe Gyi	17.5637°N 95.3359°E	
Hpet Win Kone	163710	Yoe Gyi	17.5691°N 95.3426°E	
Thaung Kone	163711	Yoe Gyi	17.5637°N 95.3518°E	
Ywar Thit Kone	218576	Yoe Gyi	17.5718°N 95.3392°E	
Htan Kone	151341	Dambi	17.7097°N 95.2787°E	
Aung Thu Kha	151345	Dambi	17.7084°N 95.2679°E	
Kyan Mar Yaye Kwet Thit	151344	Dambi		
Hpa Yar Tan	151342	Dambi		
Ywar Ma	151340	Dambi	17.7142°N 95.2695°E	
Ku Lar Tan	151339	Dambi		
Kun Chan Kone	151338	Dambi	17.7207°N 95.2643°E	
Kyaung Tan	151337	Dambi		
Sar Taik Tan	151336	Dambi		
Aung Chan Thar Kwet Thit	151335	Dambi		
Ah Nyar Tan	151334	Dambi		
Zay Paing	151343	Dambi		
Kywe Te Kone	153023	Inn Ga Yan	17.7198°N 95.3172°E	
Kan Nar Let Pan Su	153025	Inn Ga Yan	17.7278°N 95.2367°E	
Za Yit Yoe	153024	Inn Ga Yan	17.7141°N 95.3125°E	
Yae Le	153015	Inn Ga Yan	17.7434°N 95.2628°E	
Tar Nar Su	153022	Inn Ga Yan	17.7214°N 95.3081°E	
Tha Pyu Seik	153012	Inn Ga Yan	17.7492°N 95.3072°E	
Oke Shit Kone	153014	Inn Ga Yan	17.7302°N 95.2795°E	
Oke Shit Kone (West)	218577	Inn Ga Yan	17.7388°N 95.2705°E	
Let Pan Su (East)	153016	Inn Ga Yan	17.7548°N 95.2566°E	
Let Pan Su (West)	153017	Inn Ga Yan	17.7496°N 95.2513°E	
Ye Di (aka Ye Hti)	153019	Inn Ga Yan	17.7176°N 95.2722°E	
Thaung Su	153018	Inn Ga Yan	17.7438°N 95.2459°E	
Inn Ga Yan	153011	Inn Ga Yan	17.7143°N 95.3057°E	
Let Pan Tan	153020	Inn Ga Yan	17.7155°N 95.3155°E	
Ywar Thit	153021	Inn Ga Yan	17.7191°N 95.2891°E	
Ma Au Kone	153013	Inn Ga Yan	17.7313°N 95.3122°E	
Pay Kone	158001	Myo Kwin	17.7287°N 95.2449°E	
Ywar Thit Kone	158004	Myo Kwin	17.7145°N 95.2141°E	
Myo Kwin Tar Paing	157998	Myo Kwin	17.7283°N 95.2304°E	
Kant Lant Kone	158000	Myo Kwin	17.7211°N 95.256°E	
Tha Hpan Cho	158002	Myo Kwin	17.7249°N 95.2199°E	
Nyaung Pin Su	158003	Myo Kwin	17.7272°N 95.2235°E	
Kun Chan Kone	157999	Myo Kwin	17.7191°N 95.2628°E	
Ah Lel Su	158006	Myo Kwin	17.7266°N 95.2342°E	
Daunt Te	158005	Myo Kwin	17.7164°N 95.2517°E	
Kayin Inn (East)	154163	Kayin Inn	17.705°N 95.2241°E	
Ban Maw Yoe Gyi	154165	Kayin Inn		
Ban Maw Ah Lel Su	154166	Kayin Inn	17.694°N 95.2296°E	
Ban Maw Kyaung Su	154167	Kayin Inn		
Kayin Inn (South)	154161	Kayin Inn	17.7°N 95.2167°E	
Kayin Inn Ywar Ma	154160	Kayin Inn	17.704°N 95.2193°E	
Kayin Inn (West)	154162	Kayin Inn	17.7073°N 95.2167°E	
Ta Pin Kyoe	154164	Kayin Inn	17.7014°N 95.214°E	
Bein Thay Taw Kayin Su	154168	Kayin Inn		
Kyar Kaik Kone	159524	Pyar Thar	17.6786°N 95.2259°E	
Pwe Seik	159516	Pyar Thar	17.6936°N 95.2138°E	
Hpa Yar Gyi Kone	159523	Pyar Thar	17.6909°N 95.2191°E	
Oke Aing	159525	Pyar Thar	17.6855°N 95.2391°E	
Tu Myaung	159519	Pyar Thar	17.6711°N 95.2188°E	
Kyun Te (East)	159520	Pyar Thar	17.6711°N 95.1943°E	
Yae Kyaw Su	159522	Pyar Thar	17.6721°N 95.2138°E	
Pyar Thar Pyin	159518	Pyar Thar		
Pyar Thar Tar Kwin	159517	Pyar Thar		
Ban Maw	218578	Pyar Thar		
Pyar Thar Ywar Ma	159515	Pyar Thar	17.6866°N 95.2172°E	
Kyun Te (West)	159521	Pyar Thar	17.6711°N 95.1950°E	
Saing Pyun	158220	Ngar Hpar	17.6480°N 95.2171°E	
Taung Paing	158224	Ngar Hpar		
Yae Kyi Kone	158222	Ngar Hpar	17.6507°N 95.2202°E	
Kyee Taw Kwet (North)	158219	Ngar Hpar	17.662°N 95.2155°E	
Kyee Taw Su	158218	Ngar Hpar		
Inn Ma (East)	158217	Ngar Hpar	17.665°N 95.2218°E	
Inn Ma (West)	158216	Ngar Hpar	17.6662°N 95.2199°E	
Thaung Su	158221	Nga Hpar	17.6601°N 95.2135°E	
Nga Hpar Ywar Ma	158214	Nga Hpar	17.6681°N 95.2477°E	
Oke Aing	158215	Nga Hpar	17.6806°N 95.2411°E	
Kyee Taw Kwet	158223	Nga Hpar	17.6586°N 95.2171°E	
Nwe Khway	158393	Nwe Khway	17.6857°N 95.2582°E	
Pauk Kone	158394	Nwe Khway	17.6903°N 95.2679°E	
Thea Hpyu (West)	158395	Nwe Khway	17.6712°N 95.2546°E	
Thea Hpyu (East)	158397	Nwe Khway	17.678°N 95.2619°E	
Than Lwin	158396	Nwe Khway	17.689°N 95.2397°E	
Kywe Kya	158398	Nwe Khway	17.6782°N 95.2472°E	
Gyo Gaung	162314	Thea Hpyu (Dambi)	17.6592°N 95.2546°E	
Thea Hpyu (West)	162316	Thea Hpyu (Dambi)		
Thea Hpyu (Ah Shey Su)	162317	Thea Hpyu (Dambi)		
U To	162318	Thea Hpyu (Dambi)		
Thea Hpyu	162313	Thea Hpyu (Dambi)		
Htein Kone Kyaw	162315	Thea Hpyu (Dambi)		
Ywar Thar Taung Paing	160577	Sin Ma Thay (Dambi)	17.6796°N 95.2987°E	
Sin Ma Thay	160576	Sin Ma Thay (Dambi)	17.6727°N 95.2966°E	
Na Gyi Kone	160578	Sin Ma Thay (Dambi)	17.6816°N 95.2918°E	
Auk Su	160579	Sin Ma Thay (Dambi)	17.6637°N 95.2836°E	
Sin Ma Thay Kyeik Tan	160580	Sin Ma Thay (Dambi)		
Yone Taw Su	160581	Sin Ma Thay (Dambi)	17.6697°N 95.2845°E	
U To	160583	Sin Ma Thay (Dambi)	17.6722°N 95.2733°E	
Thea Hpyu	160584	Sin Ma Thay (Dambi)		
Sin Ma Thay (North)	160585	Sin Ma Thay (Dambi)	17.6766°N 95.2962°E	
Hpa Yar Thone Su	160582	Sin Ma Thay (Dambi)	17.6606°N 95.2744°E	
Na Gyi Kone (East)	162637	Thit Hpyu Kwin	17.6905°N 95.2995°E	
Thit Hpyu Pin (South)	162635	Thit Hpyu Kwin	17.7028°N 95.2803°E	
Na Gyi Kone (West)	162636	Thit Hpyu Kwin	17.6906°N 95.2906°E	
Ywar Thar (West)	162638	Thit Hpyu Kwin	17.6857°N 95.2967°E	
Thit Hpyu Pin (North)	162634	Thit Hpyu Kwin	17.7046°N 95.2818°E	
Let Khoke Pin	156802	Let Khoke Pin	17.7048°N 95.3056°E	
Kin Mun Chaung	156804	Let Khoke Pin		
Pa Ni Aing	156805	Let Khoke Pin	17.6797°N 95.3069°E	
Ywar Thar	156806	Let Khoke Pin	17.6881°N 95.3018°E	
Ywar Thar Bu Tar Su	156807	Let Khoke Pin	17.6898°N 95.3074°E	
Za Yit Yoe	156803	Let Khoke Pin	17.7119°N 95.31°E	
Chin Taw	154426	Kin Mun Chaung	17.6931°N 95.3156°E	
Kin Mun Chaung	154422	Kin Mun Chaung	17.7059°N 95.3192°E	
Za Tat Ma	154423	Kin Mun Chaung	17.7061°N 95.3259°E	
Nga Hpei Htu (North)	154425	Kin Mun Chaung	17.6899°N 95.3298°E	
Ah Nyar Su	154424	Kin Mun Chaung	17.7115°N 95.3225°E	
Ywar Thit Tan	218579	Kin Mun Chaung		
Nga Hpei Htu (Myauk Su)	158225	Nga Hpe Htu	17.6814°N 95.3304°E	
Lel U Su	158227	Nga Hpe Htu		
Nga Hpei Htu (Taung Su)	158226	Nga Hpe Htu	17.6717°N 95.3278°E	
Taw Shey	153387	Ka Nyin Kauk	17.7072°N 95.2946°E	
Ka Nyin Kauk	153383	Ka Nyin Kauk	17.7017°N 95.3053°E	
Oe Bo Su	153384	Ka Nyin Kauk	17.6977°N 95.3015°E	
Kyan Taw Su	153385	Ka Nyin Kauk		
Htan Kone	153386	Ka Nyin Kauk	17.7092°N 95.2822°E	
Taw Shey (West)	153388	Ka Nyin Kauk	17.7084°N 95.2849°E	
Taw Shey (East)	153389	Ka Nyin Kauk	17.7084°N 95.2999°E	
Kar Kone	162579	Thin Gan Taw (Leik Chaung)	17.7128°N 95.3261°E	
Kyet Tu Yway Lay	162583	Thin Gan Taw (Leik Chaung)	17.7008°N 95.3544°E	
Thin Gan Taw	162571	Thin Gan Taw (Leik Chaung)	17.7149°N 95.3358°E	
Ka Law Kone	162577	Thin Gan Taw (Leik Chaung)	17.6984°N 95.351°E	
Na Be Kone	162572	Thin Gan Taw (Leik Chaung)		
Hle Ku	162573	Thin Gan Taw (Leik Chaung)		
Chaung Lay	162574	Thin Gan Taw (Leik Chaung)	17.7181°N 95.3479°E	
Leik Chaung (West)	162575	Thin Gan Taw (Leik Chaung)	17.7086°N 95.3561°E	
Kone Gyi Ta Chan	162576	Thin Gan Taw (Leik Chaung)	17.7066°N 95.3445°E	
Daw Na Kone	162578	Thin Gan Taw (Leik Chaung)	17.7219°N 95.3238°E	
Dar Ka	162580	Thin Gan Taw (Leik Chaung)		
Leik Chaung (East)	162582	Thin Gan Taw (Leik Chaung)	17.7107°N 95.3579°E	
Kyet Tu Yway (East)	162584	Thin Gan Taw (Leik Chaung)	17.701°N 95.3606°E	
Kyet Tu Yway (West)	162585	Thin Gan Taw (Leik Chaung)	17.6914°N 95.3552°E	
Kyet Tu Yway (South)	162586	Thin Gan Taw (Leik Chaung)	17.6919°N 95.3643°E	
Leik Chaung	162587	Thin Gan Taw (Leik Chaung)	17.7183°N 95.3672°E	
Thone Myay Saing	162581	Thin Gan Taw (Leik Chaung)	17.7089°N 95.3686°E	
Dar Ka	152370	Hpa Yar Kone	17.6699°N 95.3593°E	
Kayin Su	152369	Hpa Yar Kone		
Daw Pa Toke	152368	Hpa Yar Kone		
Hpa Yar Kone Bu Tar Nar	152367	Hpa Yar Kone	17.6683°N 95.3512°E	
Hpa Yar Kone	152363	Hpa Yar Kone	17.6703°N 95.3487°E	
Ah Kei	152364	Hpa Yar Kone	17.6801°N 95.3510°E	
Zwe Ka Man	152365	Hpa Yar Kone	17.6825°N 95.3491°E	
Mar Ga	152366	Hpa Yar Kone	17.6747°N 95.3368°E	
Kyun Te	218580	Hpa Yar Kone	17.6764°N 95.3368°E	
Pyay Taw Thar	160249	Shar Khe	17.4267°N 95.3597°E	
Shar Khe (Ah Nauk Paing)	160248	Shar Khe	17.4142°N 95.3591°E	
Shar Khe Ywar Ma	160243	Shar Khe	17.4131°N 95.3614°E	
Me Za Li Kwin	160244	Shar Khe	17.4118°N 95.3807°E	
Shar Khe (East)	160245	Shar Khe	17.4142°N 95.3657°E	
Kyun Taw	160246	Shar Khe	17.4167°N 95.3606°E	
Ne Ma Neik	160247	Shar Khe	17.4293°N 95.3534°E	
Ku Lar Su	162134	Thar Ti Kwin		
Thar Ti (South)	162133	Thar Ti Kwin	17.4996°N 95.3916°E	
U Tun Kyaw Ah Su	162135	Thar Ti Kwin	17.514°N 95.4174°E	
Kyu Taw Yoe	162139	Thar Ti Kwin	17.5131°N 95.4104°E	
Sin Lu	162140	Thar Ti Kwin	17.5167°N 95.4167°E	
Sin Lu (East)	162136	Thar Ti Kwin	17.5171°N 95.4063°E	
Tha Yet Chaung	162141	Thar Ti Kwin	17.5248°N 95.3897°E	
Thar Ti (North)	162132	Thar Ti Kwin	17.5064°N 95.4014°E	
Sin Lu (West)	162138	Thar Ti Kwin	17.5126°N 95.3904°E	
Sin Lu Pyay Taw Thar	162137	Thar Ti Kwin	17.5182°N 95.3994°E	
Shan Su	159417	Pi Tauk Kone	17.4405°N 95.3593°E	
Pi Tauk Kone	159413	Pi Tauk Kone	17.4656°N 95.3635°E	
Inn Yar Kone	159414	Pi Tauk Kone	17.4627°N 95.3516°E	
Yae Twin Yoe	159416	Pi Tauk Kone		
Dar Htoe Kone	159420	Pauk Tan Lay	17.4704°N 95.3526°E	
Kyeik Tan	159418	Pi Tauk Kone	17.4486°N 95.3605°E	
Kyon Pyaw Ka Lay	159419	Pi Tauk Kone	17.4592°N 95.3418°E	
Kyar Ga Yet	159415	Pi Tauk Kone	17.4492°N 95.3683°E	
Moke Soe Tan	159212	Pauk Tan Lay	17.4801°N 95.3450°E	
Pauk Tan Lay	159205	Pauk Tan Lay	17.4938°N 95.3654°E	
Yae Ma Gyi Aing	159206	Pauk Tan Lay	17.4938°N 95.3534°E	
La Har Kyun	159210	Pauk Tan Lay	17.4862°N 95.3387°E	
Boe Law Lay	159211	Pauk Tan Lay	17.479°N 95.3621°E	
Kyaung Aing	159208	Pauk Tan Lay	17.4831°N 95.3366°E	
Kyauk Aing	218582	Pauk Tan Lay	17.4771°N 95.3406°E	
Gyoe Aing	218581	Pauk Tan Lay	17.4851°N 95.3516°E	
Boe Law Gyi	159207	Pauk Tan Lay	17.4774°N 95.3518°E	
Oe Bo Tan	159209	Pauk Tan Lay		
Thar Ti Kwin	159200	Pauk Tan Gyi	17.5°N 95.4°E	
Pauk Tan Gyi	159199	Pauk Tan Gyi	17.4881°N 95.3857°E	
Lel U Su (East)	159202	Pauk Tan Gyi	17.4769°N 95.3975°E	
Thar Ti Ku Lar Su	159203	Pauk Tan Gyi	17.4963°N 95.3859°E	
Thar Ti Taung Su	159204	Pauk Tan Gyi	17.4966°N 95.3979°E	
Lel U Su	159201	Pauk Tan Gyi	17.48°N 95.3905°E	
Lel Di Kone	156773	Lel Di Kone	17.4671°N 95.3719°E	
Taung Ka Lon (South)	161215	Taung Ka Lon		
Let Pan Kone (Ah Nauk Su)	161211	Taung Ka Lon	17.4448°N 95.3905°E	
Let Pan Kone	161212	Taung Ka Lon	17.4538°N 95.3955°E	
Sat Thay	161214	Taung Ka Lon	17.4497°N 95.388°E	
Taung Ka Lon	161210	Taung Ka Lon	17.4499°N 95.3787°E	
Taung Ka Lon (North)	161213	Taung Ka Lon		
Zee Kone	153091	Inn Ta Lu	17.4277°N 95.3704°E	
Inn Ta Lu	153086	Inn Ta Lu	17.434°N 95.3659°E	
Pan Aing Lay	153090	Inn Ta Lu	17.4364°N 95.3727°E	
Ta Man Gyi	153089	Inn Ta Lu	17.4382°N 95.3807°E	
Sin Gaung Gyi	153088	Inn Ta Lu	17.4327°N 95.3917°E	
Pan Aing	153087	Inn Ta Lu	17.4309°N 95.3769°E	
Dei Kwin	160054	Seik Gyi	17.4164°N 95.4069°E	
Seik Gyi	160049	Seik Gyi	17.4078°N 95.3958°E	
Hlaw Ka Le	160050	Seik Gyi	17.407°N 95.4132°E	
Zee Kone	160051	Seik Gyi	17.4113°N 95.4221°E	
Za Yat Su	160052	Seik Gyi	17.4226°N 95.3986°E	
Myauk Su	160053	Seik Gyi	17.4135°N 95.3896°E	
Kwin Lel Su	160055	Seik Gyi	17.4189°N 95.3931°E	
Sin Gaung Gyi	160517	Sin Gaung (Shar Khe)	17.4429°N 95.3914°E	
Sin Gaung Ka Lay	160516	Sin Gaung (Shar Khe)	17.4409°N 95.4054°E	
Ta Man Gyi	160515	Sin Gaung (Shar Khe)	17.4397°N 95.3809°E	
Za Yat Su	160514	Sin Gaung (Shar Khe)	17.4241°N 95.4008°E	
Tha Yet Taw	160513	Sin Gaung (Shar Khe)		
Kyaung Su	160512	Sin Gaung (Shar Khe)	17.4359°N 95.4165°E	
Sin Gaung	160510	Sin Gaung (Shar Khe)		
Pyayt Sin Kone	160511	Sin Gaung (Shar Khe)	17.4318°N 95.4043°E	
Dar Ka	160098	Seik Thar (Chin Boet)	17.723°N 95.3665°E	
Tar Kyoe	160090	Seik Thar (Chin Boet)		
Seik Thar	160087	Seik Thar (Chin Boet)	17.7459°N 95.3816°E	
Kyun Hteik	160088	Seik Thar (Chin Boet)	17.7438°N 95.3902°E	
Thea Yoe	160089	Seik Thar (Chin Boet)	17.7235°N 95.4066°E	
Pauk Ta Pin	160097	Seik Thar (Chin Boet)	17.7553°N 95.3494°E	
Kywet Kyun	160096	Seik Thar (Chin Boet)	17.7476°N 95.3899°E	
Ah Lel	160095	Seik Thar (Chin Boet)	17.7283°N 95.3667°E	
Chin Boet	160094	Seik Thar (Chin Boet)	17.7258°N 95.3914°E	
Pauk Taw Kayin Su	160093	Seik Thar (Chin Boet)	17.7376°N 95.3726°E	
Kyun U	160092	Seik Thar (Chin Boet)	17.7411°N 95.3809°E	
Let Pan Su	160091	Seik Thar (Chin Boet)		
Pauk Taw Dar Ka	222269	Seik Thar (Chin Boet)		
Kyauk Ye	160099	Seik Thar (Chin Boet)	17.7266°N 95.4109°E	
U Yin Su	159262	Pe Gyi Kyun	17.808°N 95.3744°E	
Pe Gyi Kyun	159261	Pe Gyi Kyun	17.7701°N 95.3608°E	
Yae Le Su	159263	Pe Gyi Kyun	17.7969°N 95.3644°E	
Let Pan Su	159265	Pe Gyi Kyun	17.7783°N 95.351°E	
Koke Ko Su	159264	Pe Gyi Kyun	17.7731°N 95.3495°E	
Aye	159266	Pe Gyi Kyun	17.7969°N 95.3528°E	
Si Pin Thar Yar	218585	Pe Gyi Kyun	17.7892°N 95.3391°E	
Ohn Taw Su	151568	Eik Pyet		
Ka Tet	151574	Eik Pyet	17.6907°N 95.404°E	
Eik Pyet Kone Gyi	151572	Eik Pyet	17.6994°N 95.3995°E	
Tar Ngoke	151571	Eik Pyet	17.7073°N 95.4249°E	
Zee Kone	151567	Eik Pyet		
Let Pan Pin Su	151569	Eik Pyet	17.6933°N 95.4058°E	
Hnget Pyaw Taw	151570	Eik Pyet	17.7085°N 95.4278°E	
Hpaung Seik	151575	Eik Pyet	17.6961°N 95.4359°E	
Eik Pyet Kone Taw Su	151573	Eik Pyet	17.698°N 95.4084°E	
Eik Pyet	151566	Eik Pyet	17.6942°N 95.3972°E	
Thu Htay Kone	162475	Thet Kei Pyin	17.7844°N 95.4165°E	
Thet Kei Pyin	162470	Thet Kei Pyin	17.8021°N 95.4027°E	
Paw Thit Kan Nar Su	162471	Thet Kei Pyin	17.8211°N 95.3738°E	
Hnget Pyaw Taw	162472	Thet Kei Pyin	17.8257°N 95.407°E	
Kyar Chaung	162473	Thet Kei Pyin	17.7952°N 95.3849°E	
Thar Yar Su	162474	Thet Kei Pyin		
Thea Kone	162476	Thet Kei Pyin	17.7927°N 95.4113°E	
Hpa Yar Kone	162477	Thet Kei Pyin		
Kone Su	156855	Let Pan Hla		
Kyauk Ye	156854	Let Pan Hla		
Let Pan Su	156862	Let Pan Hla		
Mi Caung Aing	156856	Let Pan Hla		
Let Pan Hla	156852	Let Pan Hla	17.7749°N 95.4004°E	
Ywar Thit Kone	156860	Let Pan Hla		
Ah Nyar Su	156859	Let Pan Hla	17.7869°N 95.4048°E	
Chauk Ein Tan	156858	Let Pan Hla	17.7842°N 95.3787°E	
Let Pan Hla Ah Nyar Su	156857	Let Pan Hla	17.7856°N 95.399°E	
Nan Taw Kyun	156853	Let Pan Hla	17.7616°N 95.3871°E	
Bago Su	156861	Let Pan Hla		
Tar Kyoe	162015	Than Ba Yar Taing		
Ka Naung Kyun	162009	Than Ba Yar Taing	17.7713°N 95.3384°E	
Kyoe Kone	162008	Than Ba Yar Taing	17.7578°N 95.3364°E	
Chin Kone	162011	Than Ba Yar Taing	17.7344°N 95.332°E	
Wea Gyi	162012	Than Ba Yar Taing	17.7666°N 95.3248°E	
Kyaung Sein	162013	Than Ba Yar Taing	17.746°N 95.322°E	
Nyaung Kwayt	162016	Than Ba Yar Taing	17.7388°N 95.3341°E	
Nat Sin Kone	162014	Than Ba Yar Taing		
Kyauk Thaung Yoe	162007	Than Ba Yar Taing		
Than Ba Yar Taing	162006	Than Ba Yar Taing	17.7729°N 95.327°E	
Si Pin Thar Yar	162010	Than Ba Yar Taing	17.7856°N 95.336°E	
Auk Htone	162017	Than Ba Yar Taing		
Na Be Kone	162018	Than Ba Yar Taing	17.7341°N 95.3494°E	
Dat Tha Hmyaung	153730	Kaing Chaung	17.6628°N 95.4205°E	
Kaing Chaung	153724	Kaing Chaung	17.6831°N 95.4253°E	
Byit Inn Chaung Hpyar	153728	Kaing Chaung	17.6671°N 95.4341°E	
Kyaung Kwe	153727	Kaing Chaung	17.6784°N 95.4151°E	
Htein Pin Kwin	153726	Kaing Chaung	17.6902°N 95.4197°E	
Pyin Ma Chaung	153725	Kaing Chaung	17.6806°N 95.4400°E	
Inn Ma	153729	Kaing Chaung	17.6761°N 95.4103°E	
Ma Gyi Taw	153731	Kaing Chaung	17.6915°N 95.4299°E	
Me Za Li Nyunt	218586	Kaing Chaung	17.6864°N 95.4343°E	
Kyee Taw Chaung	154584	Ku Lar Khat	17.6782°N 95.3833°E	
Kyet Tu Yway	154580	Ku Lar Khat	17.678°N 95.3616°E	
Bi Tha Lun	154578	Ku Lar Khat	17.7026°N 95.3826°E	
Thone Myay Saing	154577	Ku Lar Khat	17.7061°N 95.3695°E	
Ywar Thit	154576	Ku Lar Khat		
Inn Nga Hpyu	154581	Ku Lar Khat	17.6865°N 95.3738°E	
Ma Au Kone	154575	Ku Lar Khat		
Aing To Lay	154587	Ku Lar Khat	17.6972°N 95.3838°E	
Kun Chan Kone	154583	Ku Lar Khat	17.6829°N 95.3887°E	
Ma Au Yoe	154590	Ku Lar Khat	17.6952°N 95.3893°E	
Nyaung Kone	154585	Ku Lar Khat	17.6934°N 95.379°E	
Kyon La Har	154586	Ku Lar Khat	17.6805°N 95.3876°E	
Ku Lar Khat	154574	Ku Lar Khat	17.6882°N 95.3817°E	
Ma Gyi Taw	154579	Ku Lar Khat		
Ywar Thit Kone	154588	Ku Lar Khat	17.6917°N 95.3849°E	
Yae Kyi Su	154589	Ku Lar Khat		
Yae Kyi Kone	154582	Ku Lar Khat	17.7007°N 95.3906°E	
Let Pan Su	156761	Lel Di		
Ma Au Yoe	156762	Lel Di	17.6922°N 95.3908°E	
Sit Pin Win Aing	156771	Lel Di		
Kyon Tone Ywar Hpyar	156770	Lel Di	17.6657°N 95.399°E	
Auk Kyin	156769	Lel Di	17.657°N 95.4268°E	
Sit Pin	156768	Lel Di	17.6561°N 95.4077°E	
Lel Di Tha Khut	156767	Lel Di	17.6660°N 95.4169°E	
Tha Khut Kwin	156766	Lel Di	17.6637°N 95.4155°E	
Inn Ma (Ah Shey Su)	156772	Lel Di	17.6695°N 95.4156°E	
Lel Di (Ah Shey Su)	156763	Lel Di	17.6635°N 95.4086°E	
Shan Taw	156765	Lel Di	17.6817°N 95.4148°E	
Let Pan Kone (Ah Nauk Paing)	156760	Lel Di	17.6876°N 95.3964°E	
Pyin Sein	156759	Lel Di	17.6875°N 95.4138°E	
Shan Su	156758	Lel Di		
Win Aing	156757	Lel Di		
Let Pan Kone (East)	156756	Lel Di	17.683°N 95.4052°E	
Inn Ma (West)	156755	Lel Di	17.6684°N 95.4084°E	
Lel Di	156754	Lel Di	17.664°N 95.4057°E	
Inn Ma	156764	Lel Di	17.6701°N 95.4134°E	
Zee Kone	218587	Lel Di		
Ta Khun Taing Su	151126	Chaung Hpyar		
Chaung Hpyar Gyi	151127	Chaung Hpyar	17.6411°N 95.4221°E	
Ma Gyi Kone	151129	Chaung Hpyar	17.649°N 95.3894°E	
Zee Kone Ywar Ma	151125	Chaung Hpyar	17.6418°N 95.4035°E	
Zee Kone Ah Lel Su	151134	Chaung Hpyar		
Tha Pyay Pin Su	151133	Chaung Hpyar	17.6484°N 95.4003°E	
Tar Nar Chaung Hpyar	151124	Chaung Hpyar		
Ah Lel Su	151132	Chaung Hpyar		
Tar Lay Chaung Hpyar	151131	Chaung Hpyar		
Si Kone	151130	Chaung Hpyar	17.6549°N 95.415°E	
Ngar Kan Yoe	151128	Chaung Hpyar	17.6504°N 95.3882°E	
Sat Pyar Aing (South)	156070	Kyon Tone	17.6711°N 95.3742°E	
Kyon Tone Ah Hpyar	156064	Kyon Tone	17.6706°N 95.3985°E	
Kyaung Kone	156065	Kyon Tone		
Kyee Taw Chaung	156066	Kyon Tone	17.6725°N 95.3838°E	
Inn Za Yat	156067	Kyon Tone	17.6639°N 95.372°E	
Thin Gan	156068	Kyon Tone	17.6696°N 95.3836°E	
Sat Pyar Aing (North)	156069	Kyon Tone	17.6778°N 95.375°E	
Aing To	156078	Kyon Tone	17.6844°N 95.3926°E	
Aing To (North)	156063	Kyon Tone		
Hmaw Say	156071	Kyon Tone	17.6675°N 95.3693°E	
Kyon Tone	156062	Kyon Tone	17.6785°N 95.3963°E	
Tar Gwa	156072	Kyon Tone	17.657°N 95.3981°E	
Sat Pyar Aing	156073	Kyon Tone	17.6752°N 95.3757°E	
Dar Ka	156074	Kyon Tone	17.6685°N 95.3584°E	
Hmaw Thay (Myauk Su)	156075	Kyon Tone		
Hmaw Thay Inn Za Yat	156076	Kyon Tone		
Kyaung Kone Chin Su	156077	Kyon Tone		
Ywar Thit Su	163848	Ywar Thit (North)		
Chin Su	163841	Ywar Thit (North)	17.658°N 95.3776°E	
Ywar Thit	163849	Ywar Thit (North)	17.646°N 95.3663°E	
Ah Lel Su	163850	Ywar Thit (North)		
Chin Chaint	163847	Ywar Thit (North)		
Kant Lant Tan	163846	Ywar Thit (North)		
Dar Ka Tan	163845	Ywar Thit (North)	17.6578°N 95.3675°E	
Gon Hnyin Tan	163844	Ywar Thit (North)	17.6609°N 95.3694°E	
Let U Su (Myauk Su)	163842	Ywar Thit (North)	17.6546°N 95.3691°E	
Ywar Thit Kone	163840	Ywar Thit (North)		
Ywar Thit (North)	163839	Ywar Thit (North)	17.6542°N 95.3622°E	
Let U Su (Taung Su)	163843	Ywar Thit (North)	17.6506°N 95.3726°E	
Kun Chan Kone	152658	Htan Ta Pin (Du Yar)	17.5580°N 95.4681°E	
Pauk Yoe	152659	Htan Ta Pin (Du Yar)	17.5515°N 95.4863°E	
Htan Ta Pin	152655	Htan Ta Pin (Du Yar)	17.5618°N 95.4805°E	
Leik Khone Koke Ko Su	152668	Htan Ta Pin (Du Yar)	17.5609°N 95.4716°E	
Oke Hpo Chaung (Myauk Su)	152656	Htan Ta Pin (Du Yar)	17.5637°N 95.4616°E	
Ta Man Su (Myauk Su)	152663	Htan Ta Pin (Du Yar)		
Lein Kone Gyi (aka Lein Tone Gyi)	152660	Htan Ta Pin (Du Yar)	17.5657°N 95.4721°E	
Lein Tone Lay	152661	Htan Ta Pin (Du Yar)		
Kyaik Htee Yoe Ywar Ma Thit Kone	152657	Htan Ta Pin (Du Yar)		
Oke Hpo Chaung Ywar Ma	152662	Htan Ta Pin (Du Yar)	17.5594°N 95.4617°E	
Ah Yoe Oe Su	152664	Htan Ta Pin (Du Yar)		
Thin Khan Aing (East)	152665	Htan Ta Pin (Du Yar)	17.5570°N 95.4727°E	
Daung Kya	152666	Htan Ta Pin (Du Yar)		
Nyaungdon	152667	Htan Ta Pin (Du Yar)	17.5702°N 95.4832°E	
No 3 Ward	218588	Htan Ta Pin (Du Yar)	17.5591°N 95.4803°E	
No 4 Ward	218589	Htan Ta Pin (Du Yar)	17.5642°N 95.4805°E	
Yin Taik Kone (Taung Su)	155028	Kya Khat Kwin	17.5388°N 95.5022°E	
Kya Khat Kwin	155019	Kya Khat Kwin	17.5382°N 95.4798°E	
Htaunt Ta Kar (Taung Su)	155021	Kya Khat Kwin	17.5267°N 95.4716°E	
Ba Mar Su	155022	Kya Khat Kwin		
Htaunt Ta Kar (Myauk Su)	155023	Kya Khat Kwin	17.5335°N 95.4751°E	
Htaunt Ta Kar Kayin Su	155024	Kya Khat Kwin		
Kyon Ta Hnee Tar Kwayt	155025	Kya Khat Kwin	17.5388°N 95.485°E	
Sein Waing	155026	Kya Khat Kwin	17.5°N 95.4667°E	
Htaunt Ta Kar	155027	Kya Khat Kwin	17.5294°N 95.4721°E	
Ah Dar Ywar Ma	155029	Kya Khat Kwin		
Yin Taik Kone Ywar Ma	155020	Kya Khat Kwin	17.5471°N 95.4903°E	
Ah Dar Wa	157778	Mway Lone	17.4967°N 95.4803°E	
Mandalay Su	157777	Mway Lone		
Sit Kone	157779	Mway Lone	17.5058°N 95.4819°E	
Sin Gaung	157776	Mway Lone	17.5107°N 95.4797°E	
Mway Lone	157775	Mway Lone	17.5137°N 95.494°E	
Pauk Kone	160233	Shar Hpyu Kone	17.5033°N 95.5021°E	
Ywar Thit Kone	160234	Shar Hpyu Kone		
Shauk Kone	160235	Shar Hpyu Kone	17.5023°N 95.4894°E	
Shauk Kone Gyi	160232	Shar Hpyu Kone	17.5009°N 95.4896°E	
Myanmar Thea Hpyu	162319	Thea Hpyu (Du Yar)		
Mway Lone Thea Hpyu	162320	Thea Hpyu (Du Yar)		
Pauk Kone	162321	Thea Hpyu (Du Yar)		
Ah Shey Thea Hpyu	162322	Thea Hpyu (Du Yar)		
Daung Su	162323	Thea Hpyu (Du Yar)		
Thea Hpyu Gyi	162324	Thea Hpyu (Du Yar)		
Sin Gaung (East)	150041	Ah Dar Sin Gaung	17.5174°N 95.4881°E	
Ah Dar Kyet Ta Nyin	150043	Ah Dar Sin Gaung	17.5279°N 95.4927°E	
Sin Ghaung (West)	150042	Ah Dar Sin Gaung	17.5151°N 95.484°E	
Ah Dar Ah Shey Su	150040	Ah Dar Sin Gaung	17.5301°N 95.5008°E	
Kya Khat Kwin	150044	Ah Dar Sin Gaung	17.5274°N 95.4805°E	
Ah Dar Htan Nha Pin	150045	Ah Dar Sin Gaung	17.532°N 95.4923°E	
Ta Man u (West)	160449	Shwe Taung Thar Ya	17.5539°N 95.4509°E	
Shwe Taung Thar Ya	160441	Shwe Taung Thar Ya	17.5634°N 95.4433°E	
Maung Pan Ah Su	160442	Shwe Taung Thar Ya		
Ko Boe Chet Ah Su	160443	Shwe Taung Thar Ya		
Ko Kyaing Ah Su	160444	Shwe Taung Thar Ya		
Kan Su	160448	Shwe Taung Thar Ya		
Thin Gan Aing Kyaung Su (East)	160445	Shwe Taung Thar Ya	17.5583°N 95.4677°E	
Shwe Taung Thar Ya (East)	160450	Shwe Taung Thar Ya	17.5642°N 95.4472°E	
Ohn Pin Su	160451	Shwe Taung Thar Ya	17.5575°N 95.4546°E	
Thin Gan Aing	160446	Shwe Taung Thar Ya	17.553°N 95.4488°E	
Ta Man U (East)	160447	Shwe Taung Thar Ya	17.5514°N 95.4567°E	
Kyan Taw (North)	158762	Ohn Pin Kwin		
Kyan Taw	158763	Ohn Pin Kwin		
Thin Gan Aing Seik	158764	Ohn Pin Kwin		
Ohn Kone	158765	Ohn Pin Kwin		
Thin Gan Aing Kyaung Su	158766	Ohn Pin Kwin		
Kyan Taw (South)	158767	Ohn Pin Kwin		
Boe San Ah Su	161683	Tha Nun Tha Nawt		
Ku Lar Kone	161687	Tha Nun Tha Nawt	17.5347°N 95.432°E	
Thone Ein Tan	161686	Tha Nun Tha Nawt	17.5395°N 95.4306°E	
Kyun Kone	161684	Tha Nun Tha Nawt	17.5368°N 95.4499°E	
Kan Su	161682	Tha Nun Tha Nawt	17.5398°N 95.456°E	
Maung Pyaw Ah Su	161681	Tha Nun Tha Nawt		
Tha Yet Taw	161680	Tha Nun Tha Nawt		
Tha Nun Tha Nawt	161679	Tha Nun Tha Nawt	17.5495°N 95.4265°E	
Kyauk Taing	161685	Tha Nun Tha Nawt	17.5228°N 95.4320°E	
Hpa Yar Kone	218590	Tha Nun Tha Nawt		
Ywar Thit Kone	155255	Kyat Ka Lay	17.5323°N 95.4473°E	
Kyat Ka Lay (Auk Su)	155258	Kyat Ka Lay		
Daung Su	155251	Kyat Ka Lay	17.5323°N 95.462°E	
Kyat Ka Lay	155250	Kyat Ka Lay	17.5138°N 95.4497°E	
Nyaung Kone	155259	Kyat Ka Lay	17.5245°N 95.445°E	
Kyat Ka Lay Ah Nyar Su	155256	Kyat Ka Lay		
Thet Kei Kone	155254	Kyat Ka Lay	17.529°N 95.4468°E	
Saik Pan Ah Su	155252	Kyat Ka Lay	17.5283°N 95.4619°E	
Thet Kei Kwin (Ah Shey Su)	155253	Kyat Ka Lay	17.5316°N 95.4494°E	
Thet Kei Kwin (Ah Nauk Su)	155257	Kyat Ka Lay	17.5289°N 95.45°E	
Yae Le	160650	Sit Kone	17.6085°N 95.5197°E	
Bant Bway Kone	160649	Sit Kone	17.6281°N 95.5089°E	
Yae Lel Thaung (Auk Su)	160656	Sit Kone	17.6094°N 95.5374°E	
Yae Lel Thaung (Ah Lel Su)	160655	Sit Kone	17.6128°N 95.5345°E	
Daik Inn	160654	Sit Kone	17.6343°N 95.5098°E	
Hpa Yar Kone	160653	Sit Kone	17.6132°N 95.5082°E	
Sit Kone Lay	160652	Sit Kone	17.6308°N 95.5192°E	
Sit Kone Gyi	160646	Sit Kone	17.6164°N 95.5191°E	
Ma Yan	160648	Sit Kone	17.6199°N 95.5066°E	
Yae Lel Baung Kyun U	160647	Sit Kone	17.6226°N 95.5385°E	
Nyaung Kone	160651	Sit Kone		
Ma Gyi Tan	218591	Sit Kone		
Taung Lone Su	161234	Taung Lone Su	17.638°N 95.4958°E	
Chay Taw Yar Kyaung Su	161235	Taung Lone Su	17.6385°N 95.5055°E	
Hpaung Chaung	161236	Taung Lone Su	17.6374°N 95.5188°E	
Auk Ywar Lay	161237	Taung Lone Su	17.6390°N 95.5096°E	
U San Daw Kwet Thit	161238	Taung Lone Su	17.6376°N 95.4942°E	
Chay Taw Yar (Ah Lel Su)	161239	Taung Lone Su	17.6386°N 95.5071°E	
Hlay Yoe	161240	Taung Lone Su		
Daik Inn	161241	Taung Lone Su	17.6352°N 95.5081°E	
Kyin Twei	161242	Taung Lone Su	17.6269°N 95.4892°E	
Bant Bway Kone	161243	Taung Lone Su	17.6291°N 95.5034°E	
Gaung Say Kyun	151660	Gaung Say Kyun	17.6638°N 95.4767°E	
Zee Taw Su	151662	Gaung Say Kyun	17.6574°N 95.4726°E	
Koke Ko Su	151661	Gaung Say Kyun		
Sein Tone	218592	Gaung Say Kyun	17.6503°N 95.4764°E	
Lel Pyin Su	156789	Lel Taw		
Lel Taw	156787	Lel Taw		
Nga Gyi Ga Yet	156788	Lel Taw		
Nin Gyan	152999	Inn Da Wei	17.6122°N 95.4745°E	
Ka Law	153001	Inn Da Wei	17.6192°N 95.4744°E	
Ma Yan Gyi	152995	Inn Da Wei	17.6084°N 95.4959°E	
Kyan Taw	152996	Inn Da Wei	17.6095°N 95.5094°E	
Chaung Hpyar	153000	Inn Da Wei	17.6128°N 95.4852°E	
Mee Nin	152997	Inn Da Wei	17.6075°N 95.4866°E	
Tha Yet Pin Hla	152998	Inn Da Wei	17.5997°N 95.4934°E	
Inn Da Wei	152994	Inn Da Wei		
Aing Gyi	161826	Tha Pyu Pin (Ba Lein/Aing Gyi)	17.5888°N 95.4906°E	
Pu Zun Taung	161824	Tha Pyu Pin (Ba Lein/Aing Gyi)	17.5946°N 95.4893°E	
Tha Pyu Pin	161823	Tha Pyu Pin (Ba Lein/Aing Gyi)	17.5908°N 95.4834°E	
Hman Kone	161825	Tha Pyu Pin (Ba Lein/Aing Gyi)	17.5941°N 95.494°E	
Hle Lan Tet (West)	152019	Hle Lan Tet	17.575°N 95.4825°E	
Hle Lan Tet (East)	152018	Hle Lan Tet	17.5743°N 95.4847°E	
Let Pan Su	152020	Hle Lan Tet	17.581°N 95.4689°E	
Ah Lel Su	152021	Hle Lan Tet	17.5822°N 95.4805°E	
Ta Loke Kone	152022	Hle Lan Tet	17.5753°N 95.4704°E	
Ta Loke Kone Ah Shey Su	218596	Hle Lan Tet	17.5706°N 95.4754°E	
Ta Loke Kone Myauk Su	218595	Hle Lan Tet	17.5754°N 95.4705°E	
Taung Yar Gyi	152023	Hle Lan Tet	17.5741°N 95.4684°E	
Taung Ta Loke Kone	152024	Hle Lan Tet	17.5695°N 95.4661°E	
Ba Lein	152025	Hle Lan Tet		
Bay Chaung	218594	Hle Lan Tet	17.5733°N 95.4889°E	
Aing Gyi (South)	218593	Hle Lan Tet	17.5816°N 95.4885°E	
Kyon Tone	150781	Bay Chaung	17.5477°N 95.5042°E	
Ta Koet	150775	Bay Chaung		
Nan Lone Kyaing	150776	Bay Chaung		
Hpa Yar Gyi Kyun	150777	Bay Chaung	17.5408°N 95.5125°E	
Htone Pwet Kone	150778	Bay Chaung	17.5434°N 95.5121°E	
Bay Chaung	150774	Bay Chaung	17.571°N 95.4891°E	
Aing Gyi	150779	Bay Chaung	17.5782°N 95.4912°E	
Nat Kone	150780	Bay Chaung	17.557°N 95.5001°E	
Myay Du Kone	162070	Than Kyoe Tan	17.6028°N 95.5070°E	
Man Kone	162069	Than Kyoe Tan	17.5944°N 95.4984°E	
Ta Koet	162071	Than Kyoe Tan	17.5899°N 95.5013°E	
Than Kyoe Tan	162068	Than Kyoe Tan	17.5958°N 95.5115°E	
Tha Yut chaung	162072	Than Kyoe Tan		
Me chaung	218599	Than Kyoe Tan		
Ma Yin Kone	218598	Than Kyoe Tan		
Yae Le	218597	Than Kyoe Tan		
Kyon Twan Gyi	158070	Nat Hmaw	17.5826°N 95.4344°E	
Nat Hmaw Kayin Su (North)	158069	Nat Hmaw		
Nat Hmaw (Auk Su)	158071	Nat Hmaw	17.5835°N 95.4224°E	
Pyar Ka Tet Wet Tan	158078	Nat Hmaw	17.5717°N 95.4089°E	
Myay Char (Auk Su)	158077	Nat Hmaw	17.5696°N 95.4301°E	
Aing Yaw Mut	158076	Nat Hmaw	17.5615°N 95.4314°E	
Yae Char (Ah Htet Su)	158075	Nat Hmaw		
Pyar Ka Tet	158074	Nat Hmaw	17.5758°N 95.4096°E	
Pyar Ka Tet Ka Lay	158073	Nat Hmaw	17.572°N 95.4057°E	
Myay Char	158072	Nat Hmaw	17.574°N 95.4291°E	
Nat Hmaw	158068	Nat Hmaw	17.5875°N 95.4236°E	
Kyet Thun Yoe	163805	Ywar Thar Kone	17.6291°N 95.4352°E	
Oe Pin Kone (East)	163792	Ywar Thar Kone		
Kyoet Pin Saing	163798	Ywar Thar Kone		
Ohn Kone (West)	163797	Ywar Thar Kone		
Tha Yet Kone	163796	Ywar Thar Kone		
Kone Gyi	163809	Ywar Thar Kone		
Ohn Kone	163810	Ywar Thar Kone		
Ma Gyi Kone	163793	Ywar Thar Kone		
Te Gyi Kone	163794	Ywar Thar Kone		
Kyat Kone	163795	Ywar Thar Kone		
Sa Lin Su	163806	Ywar Thar Kone		
Bagan Kyaung Su	163804	Ywar Thar Kone		
Gyo Paing	163803	Ywar Thar Kone		
Kan Hla Ma Gyi Kone	163811	Ywar Thar Kone		
Inn Su	163800	Ywar Thar Kone		
Nyaung Pin Say	163808	Ywar Thar Kone		
Kyauk Pyar Lan	163807	Ywar Thar Kone		
Ah Lone Su	163801	Ywar Thar Kone		
Oe Hpo Su	163802	Ywar Thar Kone		
Hmaw Thay	163799	Ywar Thar Kone	17.6259°N 95.4354°E	
Ywar Thar Kone	163791	Ywar Thar Kone		
Tan Hlar Gyi	218600	Ywar Thar Kone		
Taung Su Chin Kone	153865	Kan Hla	17.6264°N 95.4567°E	
Nin Gyan	153863	Kan Hla	17.6157°N 95.4730°E	
Hnget Pyaw Taw	153867	Kan Hla		
Lel Taw Su	153862	Kan Hla	17.6286°N 95.4771°E	
Kan Hla	153856	Kan Hla	17.6264°N 95.4567°E	
U To	153861	Kan Hla	17.6208°N 95.4827°E	
Ka Law	153858	Kan Hla	17.6201°N 95.4780°E	
Nyaung Kone	153857	Kan Hla	17.6180°N 95.4448°E	
Baw Di Chaung	153866	Kan Hla	17.6171°N 95.4687°E	
Kyin Twei	153860	Kan Hla	17.6238°N 95.4876°E	
Ma Gyi Kone	153859	Kan Hla		
Auk Kyin Su	153864	Kan Hla		
Ka Law Lay	218601	Kan Hla	17.6252°N 95.4581°E	
Ywar Thit	154482	Kone Gyi		
Kyon Hpar	154485	Kone Gyi		
Kwin Ka Lay	154483	Kone Gyi		
Ta Khun Taing (East)	154480	Kone Gyi	17.6041°N 95.4435°E	
Ta Khun Taing (Ah Nauk Su)	154486	Kone Gyi	17.6049°N 95.4309°E	
Ohn Kone (South)	154481	Kone Gyi		
Kone Gyi	154479	Kone Gyi	17.6192°N 95.4395°E	
Ta Khun Taing Ywar Ma	154484	Kone Gyi	17.608°N 95.4376°E	
Kywe Thaung	154487	Kone Gyi		
Nat Chaung	156100	Kyon Twan	17.5904°N 95.4323°E	
Oe Boe Kone	156101	Kyon Twan	17.5874°N 95.4324°E	
Ma Bone	156102	Kyon Twan	17.576°N 95.4347°E	
Auk Chin Su	156103	Kyon Twan		
Boe Thar Khway Ah Su	156104	Kyon Twan		
Kyon Twan Gyi	218602	Kyon Twan	17.5805°N 95.4399°E	
Nat Sin Kone	156778	Lel Gyi Kwin		
Nan Kone	156779	Lel Gyi Kwin		
Sa Khan Gyi	156777	Lel Gyi Kwin	17.6191°N 95.3977°E	
Lel Gyi Kwin	156774	Lel Gyi Kwin	17.6222°N 95.3891°E	
Ywar Thit (North)	156775	Lel Gyi Kwin	17.6369°N 95.3712°E	
Ywar Thit (South)	156780	Lel Gyi Kwin	17.6286°N 95.3663°E	
Kyu Ka Paing	156776	Lel Gyi Kwin	17.6282°N 95.3721°E	
Kyu Ka Paing	156498	La Har Kyaw	17.6155°N 95.3711°E	
Chin Su	156499	La Har Kyaw		
Tha Yet Pin Kwin	156500	La Har Kyaw	17.604°N 95.3675°E	
Kyu Taw Inn	156501	La Har Kyaw		
Pan Tin	156502	La Har Kyaw		
Pein Inn	156503	La Har Kyaw	17.6146°N 95.3617°E	
La Har Thin	156504	La Har Kyaw	17.602°N 95.3602°E	
Thin Gan Twin	156505	La Har Kyaw	17.6131°N 95.3776°E	
Gway Aing	156506	La Har Kyaw		
Chin Boet	156507	La Har Kyaw		
La Har Kyaw	156497	La Har Kyaw	17.5994°N 95.3759°E	
Nyaung Waing (East)	158640	Nyaung Waing	17.621°N 95.402°E	
Za Loke Ma	158639	Nyaung Waing		
Tha Yet Chaung	158638	Nyaung Waing		
Nyaung Waing	158636	Nyaung Waing	17.6245°N 95.4045°E	
Si Kone	158637	Nyaung Waing		
Sa Khan Gyi	159733	Sa Khan Gyi	17.6135°N 95.3973°E	
Kyet Su Kwin	159739	Sa Khan Gyi	17.5985°N 95.3931°E	
Sa Khan Gyi (East)	159738	Sa Khan Gyi	17.6128°N 95.4004°E	
Sa Khan Gyi (North)	159737	Sa Khan Gyi		
Kyat Kwin	159736	Sa Khan Gyi		
Kha Lauk Me	159734	Sa Khan Gyi	17.6082°N 95.4173°E	
Ohn Pin Su	159735	Sa Khan Gyi	17.6052°N 95.3986°E	
Pan Tin Kone	155689	Kyon Hpar	17.5981°N 95.4101°E	
Ah Shey Chin Kwin	155690	Kyon Hpar		
Ah Nauk Chin Kwin	155691	Kyon Hpar		
Kun Chan Kone	155692	Kyon Hpar	17.5833°N 95.3937°E	
Let Tin Chaung	155693	Kyon Hpar		
Pay Pin Kwin	155694	Kyon Hpar		
Thein Kone	155695	Kyon Hpar	17.5891°N 95.3955°E	
Bein Sar Kone	155696	Kyon Hpar		
Lel U Su	155697	Kyon Hpar	17.5776°N 95.3938°E	
Kwin Yar Lay	155698	Kyon Hpar	17.5916°N 95.4173°E	
Shan Su	155699	Kyon Hpar		
Chin Kwin	155701	Kyon Hpar	17.5894°N 95.4034°E	
Kyon Hpar (Auk Su)	155686	Kyon Hpar	17.5996°N 95.4204°E	
La Har Ka	155702	Kyon Hpar	17.5782°N 95.3831°E	
Auk Su	155700	Kyon Hpar		
Kyoet Kone (Ah Nauk Su)	155687	Kyon Hpar	17.6046°N 95.4166°E	
Kyoet Kone (Ah Shey Su)	155688	Kyon Hpar	17.604°N 95.4218°E	
Gant Gaw Taw	151652	Gant Gaw Taw	17.5953°N 95.386°E	
Swei Taw Kone	151659	Gant Gaw Taw	17.5918°N 95.377°E	
San Aing	151653	Gant Gaw Taw	17.602°N 95.3889°E	
Shar Hpyu Kone	151658	Gant Gaw Taw	17.5916°N 95.3789°E	
Lel Gyi Kwin Ka Lay	151657	Gant Gaw Taw		
Gway Aing	218603	Gant Gaw Taw		
Kun Chan Kone	151656	Gant Gaw Taw		
Kyet Su Kwin	151655	Gant Gaw Taw	17.5977°N 95.3918°E	
Thein Kone	151654	Gant Gaw Taw	17.5947°N 95.3944°E	
Ta Loke Htaw	160921	Ta Loke Htaw	17.6428°N 95.3044°E	
Ma Yan Pin	160922	Ta Loke Htaw	17.6359°N 95.3123°E	
Ku Lar Tan	160923	Ta Loke Htaw	17.6446°N 95.3107°E	
Myit Kaing	160924	Ta Loke Htaw		
Chin Kone	160925	Ta Loke Htaw		
Ywar Thit Kone	160926	Ta Loke Htaw	17.64°N 95.3094°E	
Tar Lay Zay Paing	160929	Ta Loke Htaw		
Tha Maing	160930	Ta Loke Htaw	17.6308°N 95.2996°E	
Yae Lel Tan	160931	Ta Loke Htaw		
Baw Kone	160927	Ta Loke Htaw		
Inn Kha War	160932	Ta Loke Htaw	17.6309°N 95.3104°E	
Ah Nyar Tan	160928	Ta Loke Htaw		
Shwe Bo Tan	163619	Ye Kwin	17.6268°N 95.3537°E	
Ye Kwin	163615	Ye Kwin	17.631°N 95.3646°E	
Ta Loke Kone	163616	Ye Kwin	17.6216°N 95.3567°E	
Dar Ka Tan	163617	Ye Kwin	17.6334°N 95.3637°E	
Kyee Kone	163618	Ye Kwin		
Oe Bo Kone	163620	Ye Kwin	17.6293°N 95.3586°E	
Tha Pyu Kone	163621	Ye Kwin	17.6423°N 95.3598°E	
Pa Khan Tan	163622	Ye Kwin	17.6394°N 95.3586°E	
Sauk Taw Yoe	163623	Ye Kwin	17.6319°N 95.3547°E	
Kyein Chaint	163624	Ye Kwin	17.6336°N 95.3476°E	
Yae Twin Yoe	152929	In Ga Po	17.6057°N 95.3148°E	
Shwe Twin	152928	In Ga Po	17.6160°N 95.3169°E	
Myauk Da Kar	152935	In Ga Po	17.6235°N 95.3352°E	
Kun Chan Kone	152936	In Ga Po	17.6148°N 95.3255°E	
Ta Loke Pin Su	152925	In Ga Po		
Ywar Thit Kone	152934	In Ga Po	17.6064°N 95.3304°E	
In Ga Po	152924	In Ga Po	17.615°N 95.3315°E	
Nga Yant Kyaw	152926	In Ga Po		
Thea Kone Gyi	218604	In Ga Po	17.6313°N 95.3199°E	
Dar Ka (North)	152930	In Ga Po	17.6019°N 95.3189°E	
Shwe Nyaung Pin	152931	In Ga Po	17.5765°N 95.3156°E	
In Ga Po (Ah Nauk Su)	152932	In Ga Po	17.6078°N 95.3261°E	
Kyu Taw Inn	152933	In Ga Po	17.5989°N 95.3434°E	
Hmaw Thay	152927	In Ga Po	17.6073°N 95.3173°E	
Kyu Taw	152938	In Ga Po		
Kyoet Pin	152937	In Ga Po	17.6204°N 95.3449°E	
Nat Win Ma	160592	Sin Ma Thay (Ta Loke Htaw)	17.6629°N 95.3124°E	
Ka Nyin Kone	160587	Sin Ma Thay (Ta Loke Htaw)	17.6541°N 95.3145°E	
Sin Ma Thay	160586	Sin Ma Thay (Ta Loke Htaw)	17.6681°N 95.2939°E	
Nga Shint Ga Yat Tar Paing	160589	Sin Ma Thay (Ta Loke Htaw)	17.6535°N 95.29327°E	
Pu Zun Taung	160591	Sin Ma Thay (Ta Loke Htaw)	17.666°N 95.3099°E	
Inn Ga Yan	160588	Sin Ma Thay (Ta Loke Htaw)	17.6552°N 95.3028°E	
Pyin Htaung Kwin	160590	Sin Ma Thay (Ta Loke Htaw)	17.66°N 95.3099°E	
Kyoet Pin Kwayt	150801	Beik Yoe	17.6522°N 95.2727°E	
Thar Paing	218605	Sin Ma Thay (Ta Loke Htaw)		
Beik Yoe	150800	Beik Yoe	17.6447°N 95.2737°E	
Khat Cho Kone	150802	Beik Yoe	17.6528°N 95.2785°E	
Hpa Yar Thone Su	150804	Beik Yoe		
Nga Shint Ga Yet	150805	Beik Yoe	17.6516°N 95.2927°E	
Kyaung Kone	150806	Beik Yoe	17.6428°N 95.2798°E	
Sin Ma Thay (Auk Su)	150803	Beik Yoe	17.6675°N 95.2922°E	
Shan Su	151836	Gyo Gaung		
Gyone Gyone Kya	151837	Gyo Gaung		
Chaung Hpyar	151835	Gyo Gaung	17.6345°N 95.237°E	
Ywar Thit Sa	151834	Gyo Gaung	17.642°N 95.258°E	
Htauk Shar Kone	151831	Gyo Gaung	17.647°N 95.2526°E	
Daung Kya	151833	Gyo Gaung	17.6377°N 95.2661°E	
Kya Wet Tan	151828	Gyo Gaung	17.6448°N 95.2388°E	
Kin Mun Chin Kone	151829	Gyo Gaung	17.6438°N 95.2417°E	
Sin Thay	151830	Gyo Gaung	17.6414°N 95.2497°E	
Be Pauk	151832	Gyo Gaung	17.6432°N 95.2486°E	
Leik Chaung	151838	Gyo Gaung	17.6479°N 95.2396°E	
Shan Su	162242	Thea Bwet		
Chaung Hpyar (Myauk Su)	162241	Thea Bwet		
Chaung Hpyar (Taung Su)	162240	Thea Bwet		
Kywe Lan Su	162239	Thea Bwet		
Yae Kyi Kwet Thit	162243	Thea Bwet		
Taung Hpoet Tan	156509	La Har Pa		
Ah Lel Su	156510	La Har Pa		
La Har Pa	156508	La Har Pa	17.6189°N 95.2443°E	
Oke Pon	153462	Ka Nyin Ngu	17.6°N 95.2333°E	
Me Za Li Kwin	153461	Ka Nyin Ngu		
Ka Nyin Ngu	153459	Ka Nyin Ngu	17.605°N 95.2203°E	
Hnget Pyaw Taw	153460	Ka Nyin Ngu		
Let U Su	153463	Ka Nyin Ngu		
Kyat Pyay (Ah Shey Su)	163933	Za Yat Kwin	17.6148°N 95.2764°E	
U Yin Kone	163928	Za Yat Kwin	17.6078°N 95.2681°E	
Thin Gan Taw	163921	Za Yat Kwin	17.626°N 95.2795°E	
Kyet Pyay Gyi	163927	Za Yat Kwin	17.615°N 95.2847°E	
Kyat Pyay (Ah Lel Su)	163931	Za Yat Kwin	17.6133°N 95.2675°E	
Za Yat Kwin	163920	Za Yat Kwin	17.6018°N 95.2537°E	
Ta Loke Pin Chaung	163923	Za Yat Kwin	17.6186°N 95.2889°E	
Kone Lay	163922	Za Yat Kwin	17.6216°N 95.2749°E	
Boe Lay Kone	163932	Za Yat Kwin		
Boe Lauk Yoe Kone	163925	Za Yat Kwin		
Kan Gyi Daunt	163926	Za Yat Kwin		
Kyat Pyay (Ah Nauk Su)	163930	Za Yat Kwin	17.6126°N 95.2604°E	
Ngar Noke Se	163929	Za Yat Kwin	17.6203°N 95.2555°E	
Kyet Pyay Kyaung Su	163924	Za Yat Kwin	17.6107°N 95.2765°E	
Moe Kaung Su	218606	Za Yat Kwin	17.6069°N 95.2594°E	
U Yin Kone	151550	Doke Yaik	17.6056°N 95.2704°E	
Tha Pyu Yoe	151554	Doke Yaik	17.5941°N 95.2698°E	
Kyu Taw	151552	Doke Yaik	17.5974°N 95.2722°E	
Sin Thay (South)	151551	Doke Yaik	17.6034°N 95.2803°E	
Doke Yaik	151548	Doke Yaik	17.5856°N 95.2763°E	
Ta Yoke Kone	151555	Doke Yaik		
Pa Be Kone	151556	Doke Yaik		
Kyar Ni	151553	Doke Yaik	17.5837°N 95.2913°E	
Nga Khone Ma Chaung	151549	Doke Yaik	17.5864°N 95.2624°E	
Sin Thay (North)	151557	Doke Yaik	17.6058°N 95.2818°E	
Dar Ka (North)	153155	Inn Win		
Dar Ka (South)	153150	Inn Win	17.5950°N 95.3149°E	
Za Yit Yoe	153151	Inn Win	17.6005°N 95.2878°E	
Ta Pa Yin Su	153152	Inn Win	17.5864°N 95.3108°E	
Shwe Nyaung Pin	153156	Inn Win		
Daw Tha Yaw	153149	Inn Win	17.5994°N 95.3060°E	
Pan Be Yoe	153157	Inn Win	17.5810°N 95.3159°E	
Eik Pauk	153153	Inn Win		
San Gyi Daunt	153154	Inn Win	17.6103°N 95.2986°E	
Gyi Aing Gyi	218609	Inn Win	17.5917°N 95.3021°E	
Kone Gyi	218608	Inn Win	17.6015°N 95.2988°E	
Kone Thar	218607	Inn Win		
Na Win	156697	Leik Khone	17.5396°N 95.2755°E	
Nga Me Aing	156696	Leik Khone	17.562°N 95.2775°E	
Leik Khone	156695	Leik Khone	17.5602°N 95.2613°E	
Ba Ho Kwet Thit	156705	Leik Khone	17.5511°N 95.2808°E	
Kun Chan Kone	156698	Leik Khone	17.5566°N 95.2626°E	
Ban Maw	156699	Leik Khone	17.5509°N 95.2927°E	
Thar Yar Kone	156704	Leik Khone	17.566°N 95.2747°E	
Leik Htu	156703	Leik Khone	17.5464°N 95.2708°E	
Ah Nyar Su	156702	Leik Khone	17.567°N 95.2609°E	
Ta Loke Kone	156700	Leik Khone	17.573°N 95.2651°E	
Ywar Thit Kone	156701	Leik Khone	17.5704°N 95.2756°E	
Myay Zar	156706	Leik Khone	17.558°N 95.2798°E	
Kyaung Kone	153027	Inn Gyi	17.5734°N 95.2889°E	
Ka Nyin Chaung	153028	Inn Gyi	17.565°N 95.2893°E	
Inn Gyi	153026	Inn Gyi	17.5582°N 95.3021°E	
Hpa Yar Kone	153036	Inn Gyi		
Tha Yet Kone	153035	Inn Gyi	17.5532°N 95.3115°E	
Taung Su	153034	Inn Gyi		
Ma Gyi Pin Kwin	153033	Inn Gyi	17.564°N 95.3035°E	
Se Inn	153032	Inn Gyi	17.5568°N 95.2905°E	
Ban Maw (Taung Su)	153031	Inn Gyi	17.5496°N 95.2956°E	
Pauk Kone	153029	Inn Gyi	17.5778°N 95.2965°E	
Pan Be Kone	153030	Inn Gyi	17.5812°N 95.289°E	
Yon Tha Lin Mee Ya Htar	163715	Yon Tha Lin	17.5284°N 95.3034°E	
Thin Gan Aing	163722	Yon Tha Lin	17.5293°N 95.2712°E	
Than Za Gar	163721	Yon Tha Lin		
Myo Kwet	163716	Yon Tha Lin	17.5267°N 95.3018°E	
Yon Tha Lin Kwin	163717	Yon Tha Lin	17.5312°N 95.3008°E	
Kyee Taw Gyi	163720	Yon Tha Lin	17.5345°N 95.2881°E	
Ban Maw	163718	Yon Tha Lin	17.5409°N 95.287°E	
Ah Lel Kone	163719	Yon Tha Lin		
Ah Nauk Ywar Ma	218611	Yon Tha Lin	17.5326°N 95.2971°E	
Shwe Man Lwin	218610	Yon Tha Lin		
Yon Tha Lin	160954	Ma Dawt Ta Loke Kone	17.5333°N 95.3°E	
Dei Kwin	160953	Ma Dawt Ta Loke Kone	17.4935°N 95.2835°E	
Taung Tha Le	160952	Ma Dawt Ta Loke Kone	17.502°N 95.2895°E	
Ma Gyi Pin Kwin	160951	Ma Dawt Ta Loke Kone	17.4985°N 95.3072°E	
Ma Dawt	160950	Ma Dawt Ta Loke Kone	17.5163°N 95.2976°E	
Nan Ka LuThar	160949	Ma Dawt Ta Loke Kone	17.4968°N 95.2864°E	
Inn Pyar	160948	Ma Dawt Ta Loke Kone	17.5126°N 95.2838°E	
Tar Nar Su	160947	Ma Dawt Ta Loke Kone	17.5237°N 95.2993°E	
Ta Loke Kone	160946	Ma Dawt Ta Loke Kone	17.5216°N 95.3040°E	
Inn Ga Yan	160955	Ma Dawt Ta Loke Kone	17.5170°N 95.2878°E	
Za Bu Nyunt	218613	Ma Dawt Ta Loke Kone		
Kone Kaw Chan	162339	Thea Hpyu (Yon Tha Lin)		
Thea Hpyu Taung Su	162342	Thea Hpyu (Yon Tha Lin)	17.4669°N 95.2947°E	
Mi Chaung U	162340	Thea Hpyu (Yon Tha Lin)	17.4837°N 95.3119°E	
Dei Kwin	162338	Thea Hpyu (Yon Tha Lin)	17.4925°N 95.2793°E	
Gyoet Kone	162337	Thea Hpyu (Yon Tha Lin)	17.4741°N 95.2972°E	
Kaw Chan	162336	Thea Hpyu (Yon Tha Lin)	17.4849°N 95.2919°E	
Kyar Chaung	162335	Thea Hpyu (Yon Tha Lin)	17.4772°N 95.2782°E	
Oke Hpo Kone	162334	Thea Hpyu (Yon Tha Lin)	17.4834°N 95.2786°E	
Thea Hpyu	162333	Thea Hpyu (Yon Tha Lin)	17.473°N 95.2928°E	
Kan Ka Lay	162341	Thea Hpyu (Yon Tha Lin)	17.4742°N 95.3092°E	
Za Yat Seik	150373	Ah Waing Kyaung Su	17.4602°N 95.3289°E	
Kyon Pyaw Lay	150374	Ah Waing Kyaung Su	17.4512°N 95.3365°E	
Kan Kone	220328	Ah Waing Kyaung Su	17.47432°N 95.3090°E	
Kyaung Aing	220331	Ah Waing Kyaung Su	17.4703°N 95.3462°E	
Kyee Aing	220329	Ah Waing Kyaung Su	17.4495°N 95.3346°E	
Nun Aing	220330	Ah Waing Kyaung Su	17.4634°N 95.3353°E	
Kan Ka lay	150372	Ah Waing Kyaung Su	17.4712°N 95.3107°E	
Kyaung Su	150369	Ah Waing Kyaung Su	17.4677°N 95.312°E	
Meit Htee Yoe	150371	Ah Waing Kyaung Su	17.4722°N 95.3263°E	
Pan Tin Kone	150370	Ah Waing Kyaung Su	17.4765°N 95.3362°E	
Mi Chaung U	150459	Aing Zauk	17.4993°N 95.3257°E	
Mi Chaung Doe	150460	Aing Zauk	17.5097°N 95.324°E	
Pan Tin Kone	150458	Aing Zauk	17.4778°N 95.3352°E	
Kan Kone	150457	Aing Zauk	17.4756°N 95.3129°E	
Lel Gyi Lay Twin	150456	Aing Zauk	17.5115°N 95.3245°E	
Za Loke Ma	150455	Aing Zauk	17.4855°N 95.3278°E	
Pein Inn Ywar Thit	150454	Aing Zauk	17.4944°N 95.3292°E	
Pein Inn	150453	Aing Zauk	17.4984°N 95.3288°E	
Aing Zauk	150452	Aing Zauk	17.489°N 95.3231°E	
Lel Pyin Su	218614	Aing Zauk		
Pang Thaw Chaung	218615	Aing Zauk	17.4893°N 95.3240°E	
Thea Kone	218616	Aing Zauk	17.4751°N 95.3291°E	
Tha Moke Da Yoe	161647	Tha Moke Da Yoe	17.4919°N 95.2724°E	
Thet Kei Pyin	161648	Tha Moke Da Yoe	17.4827°N 95.2609°E	
Ma Lwei	161654	Tha Moke Da Yoe		
Oke Shit Kone (West)	161653	Tha Moke Da Yoe	17.5120°N 95.2600°E	
Koe Ein Tan	161652	Tha Moke Da Yoe	17.4995°N 95.2733°E	
Dei Kwin	161650	Tha Moke Da Yoe	17.5026°N 95.2766°E	
Kyaung Aing	161649	Tha Moke Da Yoe	17.5090°N 95.2733°E	
Ywar Thit Kone	161651	Tha Moke Da Yoe	17.4963°N 95.2611°E	
In Waing Lay	218620	Tha Moke Da Yoe	17.°N 95.°E	
Oke Shit Kone	218618	Tha Moke Da Yoe	17.°N 95.°E	
Seik Chay Pin	218617	Tha Moke Da Yoe	17.°N 95.°E	
Thu Kha Ba La	218619	Tha Moke Da Yoe	17.°N 95.°E	
Zee Kone	218621	Tha Moke Da Yoe	17.°N 95.°E	
Kyu Taw Kone	162533	Thin Ban Kone		
Kyat Kwin Gyo Gyi Kone	162536	Thin Ban Kone		
Lel Gyi Lay Twin	162534	Thin Ban Kone		
La Har Pa Ni	162530	Thin Ban Kone	17.5237°N 95.3351°E	
Baw Di Kone	162532	Thin Ban Kone		
Thin Ban Kone	162525	Thin Ban Kone	17.5268°N 95.3211°E	
Kyar Inn Kone	162526	Thin Ban Kone		
Taung Kone	162527	Thin Ban Kone		
Oe Hpo Kone	162528	Thin Ban Kone	17.5279°N 95.3273°E	
U To	162531	Thin Ban Kone		
Pyin Taung Kwin	162535	Thin Ban Kone		
Ma Gyi Pin Kwin	162529	Thin Ban Kone		
Htan Lay Pin Kyar Inn	157356	Ma Yoe Thaung	17.5568°N 95.3175°E	
Hpa Yar Hpyu Su Ma Yoe Thaung	157357	Ma Yoe Thaung	17.5534°N 95.3367°E	
Hpa Yar Kone Lel Di	157355	Ma Yoe Thaung	17.5329°N 95.3362°E	
Kyar Inn	218622	Ma Yoe Thaung	17.5415°N 95.3110°E	
Ma Yoe Thaung	218623	Ma Yoe Thaung	17.5619°N 95.3213°E	
Ma Yan Cho	157303	Ma Yan Cho	17.5087°N 95.3514°E	
Ma Yan Cho (West)	157311	Ma Yan Cho	17.5088°N 95.3485°E	
Mi Chaung Su	157307	Ma Yan Cho	17.5171°N 95.3335°E	
Tha Yet Aing	157308	Ma Yan Cho	17.5112°N 95.3432°E	
Kun Chan Kone	157309	Ma Yan Cho	17.4958°N 95.3579°E	
Ma Yan Kyar	157310	Ma Yan Cho	17.5143°N 95.3469°E	
Ah Lel Su	157304	Ma Yan Cho	17.5017°N 95.3604°E	
Tha Yet Kone	157305	Ma Yan Cho		
Me Za Li	157306	Ma Yan Cho		
Kyaung Su	160672	Sit Kwin		
Chin Kwin	160673	Sit Kwin		
Ywar Ma	160674	Sit Kwin		
Sit Kwin	160671	Sit Kwin	17.6242°N 95.4276°E	
Ywar Thar Kone	160675	Sit Kwin	17.6311°N 95.4428°E	
Gyoet Pin Waing	160676	Sit Kwin	17.6300°N 95.4358°E	
Hmaw Thay	218624	Sit Kwin	17.6254°N 95.4353°E	
Kone Su	218625	Sit Kwin	17.6265°N 95.4290°E	
Kyet Thun Yoe	218626	Sit Kwin	17.6276°N 95.4327°E	
Kat Tay	154128	Kaw Zan	17.647°N 95.3543°E	
Ywar Thit Ka Lay	154127	Kaw Zan	17.6569°N 95.354°E	
Baw Di Kone	154129	Kaw Zan	17.6485°N 95.3619°E	
Kaw Zan	154122	Kaw Zan	17.6557°N 95.3402°E	
Sauk Thay	154126	Kaw Zan	17.6488°N 95.3585°E	
Taik Gyi Kone	154124	Kaw Zan	17.6466°N 95.3201°E	
Pet Tan	154125	Kaw Zan	17.643°N 95.333°E	
Kyun Taw	154123	Kaw Zan		
