= Htay Oo =

Politician and Military Officer in Burma

- ေဌးဦး
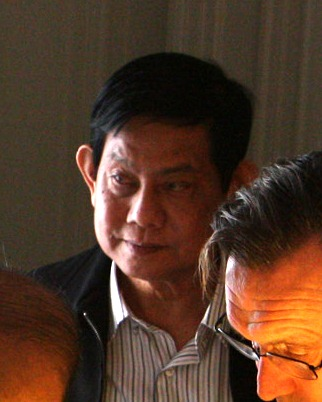
- Htay Oo in 2013

Member of the House of Representatives
- In office 31 January 2011 – 29 January 2016
- Preceded by: Constituency established
- Succeeded by: Khin Maung Yi
- Constituency: Hinthada Township
- Majority: 142,704 (81.09%)

Minister for Agriculture and Irrigation of Myanmar
- In office 18 September 2004 – 30 March 2011

Minister of Cooperatives
- In office 25 August 2003 – ?

General Secretary of the Union Solidarity and Development Party
- In office 2 June 2010 – October 2012
- Preceded by: Position established
- Succeeded by: Maung Maung Thein

Deputy Chairman of the Union Solidarity and Development Party
- In office October 2012 – August 2015
- Preceded by: Shwe Mann
- Succeeded by: Myat Hein

Personal details
- Born: 20 January 1950 (age 76) Henzada, Burma
- Party: Union Solidarity and Development Party
- Spouse: Ni Ni Win
- Education: University of Yangon Officer Training School, Myanmar

Military service
- Allegiance: Burma
- Branch/service: Myanmar Army
- Rank: Major-General

Htay Oo (Burmese: ဌေးဦး, romanized: htayy u;born 20 January 1950) is a Burmese former politician and military officer, and previously served as Pyithu Hluttaw MP for Hinthada constituency from 2011 to 2016. He also served as Minister for Agriculture and Irrigation of Myanmar from 18 September 2004 to 30 March 2011, and Minister for Cooperatives in 2003. He was formerly a retired major general in the Myanmar Army. Htay Oo was elected Deputy chairman of the Union Solidarity and Development Party, and served from October 2012 to August 2015. He was then elected as the chairman of Party Central Leading Committee of the Union Solidarity and Development Party succeeded to Shwe Mann in August 2015.
