= Zalun Township =

Township in Ayeyarwady Region, Myanmar

Zalun Township ဇလွန်မြို့နယ်
- Township
- Location in Hinthada district
- Coordinates: 17°25′N 95°34′E
- Country: Myanmar
- Region: Ayeyarwady Region
- District: Hinthada District
- Capital: Zalun

Area
  - Total: 247.77 sq mi (641.7 km^{2})
- Elevation: 36.17 ft (11.02 m)

Population (2023)
  - Total: 178,600
  - Density: 720.8/sq mi (278.3/km^{2})
  - Ethnicities: Bamar; Karen
  - Religions: Buddhism; Christianity
- Time zone: UTC+6:30 (MMT)

Zalun Township (Burmese: ဇလွန်မြို့နယ်) is a township of Hinthada District, Ayeyarwady Region, Myanmar. The township has one town- the principal town of Zalun, which is further divided into five wards. The township also has 66 village tracts grouping together 456 villages.

== Geography ==
The township is located in the northern part of Ayeyarwady Region with the tripoint with Yangon Region's Taikkyi Township and Bago Region's Tharrawaddy Township to its east. To its west, it borders Hinthada Township, and to its south, it borders Danubyu Township, Ma-ubin District.

The township is situated along the Irrawaddy River, which flows north-south through its territory and acts as a major source of transportation and commerce. The township is prone to natural disasters like floods and cyclones. Approximately two-thirds of the township lies to the west of the river, while the remaining third is on the eastern shore. The township lies entirely within the Irrawaddy Delta and is characterised by low-lying wetland. The township has some flora like plum, nim and palm trees but reports no wild fauna.

The township has significant arsenic contamination, especially in rural water sources though researchers and NGOs have been working to reduce contamination.

== Demographics ==
Historical Population
Year	Zalun Township	±%
1973		—
1983		—
2014	168,203	—
2018	168,433	+0.1%
2019	175,233	+4.0%
2022	182,168	+4.0%
2023	178,600	−2.0%
Source: Ministry of Labor, Immigration, and Population data, General Administration Department

In 2014, the township had a population of 168,203. Literacy rates were claimed to be greater than 95%. The labor participation rate was around 68% for men and women. Most residents own their homes, typically constructed of bamboo, corrugated sheets, other wood and leaves. Cooking is typically done with firewood powered cooking stoves. Most residents had access to improved water sources like bored wells. Most residents of the township are Buddhist, with small populations of Christians and Muslims.

In 2019, the town grew to a population of 175,233. In 2022, the township grew to its peak at 182,168 people before reducing in population by 2023 to 178,600 people. The township consists of 85% Bamar people with the main minority being Karen people. 84.4% of the population follows Buddhism with the second largest population professing Christianity at 8.9%.

== Economy and transport ==
Zalun Township is well connected having the highest number of trips to Yangon out of all townships in Hinthada District. The township is a developing township with agriculture as its primary industry, relying on its many waterways and roadways to export its primary crops of rice and pulses to Yangon Region.

Microfinance initiatives in the township have helped residents expand and diversify small businesses and significantly empower women to manage household financial decisions.

== Towns and villages ==
- Amyet
- Apyauk
- Chaunggyi
- Danube
- Daunggyi
- Gamonzu
- Gonnyindan
- Gwetkyi
- Hna-eindan
- Htonput
- Ingade
- Inswet
- Kanugale
- Kanugyi
- Kanyinkwin
- Kawt Kat
- Kawt Sein
- Kya-in
- Kyaungzu
- Kyongyaik
- Kyonsha
- Khin Pyae
- Kyon-Zayit
- Kywepaganchaung
- Leikkonzu
- Le-u
- Manyeinzu
- Mayokha
- Maung Htaung
- Mee Thway Gone
- Methaung
- Merry Land
- Myitwa
- Nandawgyun
- Nankala
- Nyaungbintha
- Nyaungbinze
- Nyein-e
- Nyein-e-thida
- Okshitkwin
- Padonpeik
- Pagwe
- Paingkyon
- Pai Saw Nan
- Paletko
- Phat Thaung
- Shwedaungzu
- Shwe Kyaung
- Songon
- Thadugyaung Taung
- Thayettaw
- Thegon
- Thetkekyun
- Tontabon
- Yebawthaung
- Yele
- Yone Daw
- Zalun
- Zawgyi
- Zinyawkyun
