= Zalun =

Town in Ayeyarwady Region, Myanmar

Lemyethna လေးမျက်နှာမြို့
- Town
- Location within Myanmar
- Coordinates: 17°28′19″N 95°33′8″E
- Country: Myanmar
- Region: Ayeyarwady Region
- District: Hinthada District
- Township: Zalun Township

Area
  - Total: 4.63 sq mi (12.0 km^{2})
- Elevation: 20 ft (6.1 m)

Population (2023)
  - Total: 21,947
  - Density: 4,740/sq mi (1,830/km^{2})
- Time zone: UTC+6.30 (MMT)

Zalun (Burmese: ဇလွန်မြို့) is a town in Hinthada District in Ayeyawady Region in Myanmar and the principal town of Zalun Township. Zalun is located on the west bank of the Irrawaddy River and is subdivided into five wards. The main town area is in north Lammadaw ward and Nyaunbin Zay ward. Santan and South Lammadaw make up the other populated wards, with the last ward, Kanna Ward, stretching along the river, primarily consisting of warehousing, commercial and industrial uses.

A well-known religious site in Zalun is the Pyitawpyan Pagoda (Burmese: ပြည်တော်ပြန်ဘုရားကြီး), which houses an old Buddha image created by Sanda Thuriya of Dhanyawadi in Arakan. During the Konbaung dynasty's conquest of Arakan, the image was taken to the royal capital. During colonial times, the image was looted, along with other religious and valuable artefacts and taken to Bombay, but was returned in 1859 to Burma, where the boat transporting it was lost after some flooding on the river. The image was being recovered near Zalun, on a sandbank and taken by locals to the pagoda, which was renamed Pyitawpyan meaning "return to the kingdom". Other important sites in Zalun include Buddha Andaw and U Thila Stupa.
