= Hinthada Township =

Hinthada Township ဟင်္သာတမြို့နယ်
- Township
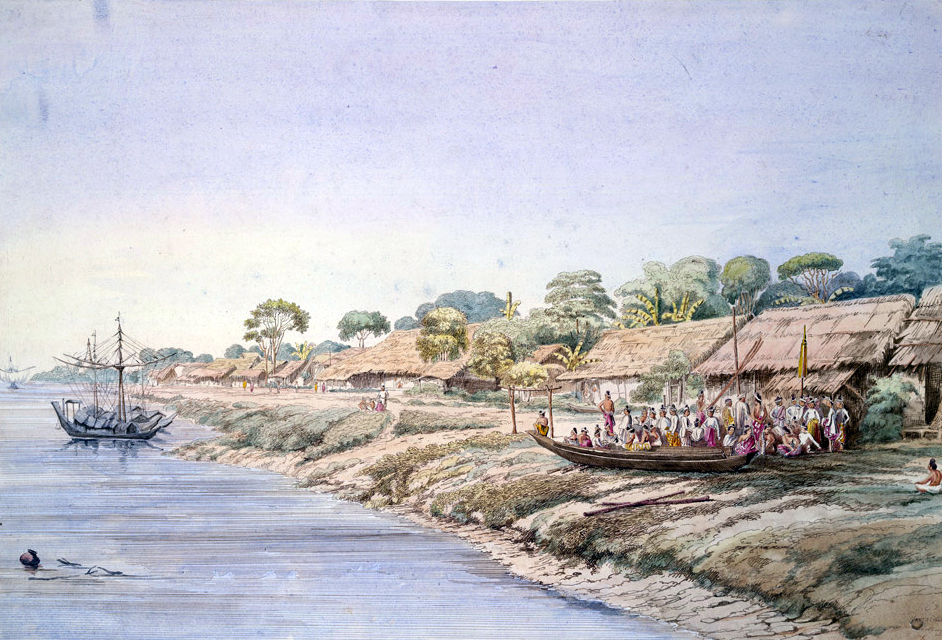
- Watercolor painting of Henzada, 1855

- Location in Hinthada district
- Coordinates: 17°38′N 95°28′E
- Country: Myanmar
- Region: Ayeyarwady Region
- District: Hinthada District
- Capital: Hinthada

Area
  - Total: 386.75 sq mi (1,001.7 km^{2})
- Elevation: 44.3 ft (13.5 m)

Population (2023)
  - Total: 353,726
  - Density: 914.61/sq mi (353.13/km^{2})
  - Ethnicities: Bamar; Karen
  - Religions: Buddhism; Islam
- Time zone: UTC+6:30 (MMT)

Hinthada Township (Burmese: ဟင်္သာတမြို့နယ်) is a township of Hinthada District in northern Ayeyarwady Region, Myanmar. The township has 3 towns, the principal town of Hinthada as well as the new towns of Duya and Talokhtaw recently elevated to town status. The towns have 31 total urban wards amongst them. Beyond those three communities, the township also contains 101 village tracts grouping together 797 villages.

== Geography ==
Hinthada Township is located in the Irrawaddy Delta and contains various streams and rivers. The principal town of Hinthada is located on the Irrawaddy River, which runs along the townships' eastern border with Letpadan Township, Bago Region. The township's northern border is mostly defined by the Ngawun River which flows between it and Ingapu Township, Myanaung District. To to township's direct west and east lie the other townships of Hinthada District with Lemyethna Township to the west and Zalun Township to the southeast. To it south it borders two other townships- Kyonpyaw Township, Kyonpyaw District and Danubyu Township, Maubin District.

The township has some flora including valuable hardwood trees like teak, pyinkadoe and padauk trees. The General Administration Department reports no fauna in the township.

Being located in the Irrawaddy Delta, the township is at high risk for meteorological hazards, including seasonal floods from monsoons. While many villages and the town of Hithada are protected by British era dykes, other unprotected areas have adapted through the use of elevated housing and water-resistant crop usage. During the 2024 floods, the township had more than 100 households relocated with renewed water diversion projects to prepare for future floods. The same area of the township had been the site of a Red Cross to help with relocating from flood-prone areas in 2020.

== Economy ==
The economy of Hinthada Township has been relatively steady. The primary industry is agriculture with rice as the primary produce. Other agricultural industries with a sizeable presence include coconuts, mangoes, onions, turmeric, poultry and pork. Many farmers and residents also engage in subsistence farming alongside commercial agriculture for various vegetables. There are various industries in the town of Hinthada to process food such as granaries as well as other industries like an iron foundry and ice manufacturing plant. The town of Hinthada is also a major port for rice and tobacco grown in the surrounding area as well as a transportation hub for rail and road with Pathein and Yangon.

== Demographics ==
Historical Population
Year	Hinthada Township	±%
1973		—
1983		—
2014	331,052	—
2018	347,919	+5.1%
2019	348,180	+0.1%
2022	353,848	+1.6%
2023	353,726	−0.0%
Source: Ministry of Labor, Immigration, and Population data, General Administration Department

In 2014, the township had a 95.7% literacy rate with a mean age of 30.1 years. In 2019, the township was mostly rural but relatively urbanised with 23.3% of the population living in the only town Hinthada. By 2023, that figure had grown to 32.8% urban population. However, by then the two villages had been elevated to town status, contribution to the urban figure. Between 2022 and 2023, the township lost a net total of 112 people.

== Notable people ==
- Bhaddanta Āciṇṇa, the Pa-Auk sayadaw was born in the township
- Htay Oo, Deputy Chairman of the Union Solidarity and Development Party (2012-2015) born and ran to represent Hinthada town.

== See also ==
- List of villages in Hinthada Township
