= Hinthada =

Hinthada ဟင်္သာတမြို့
- Town
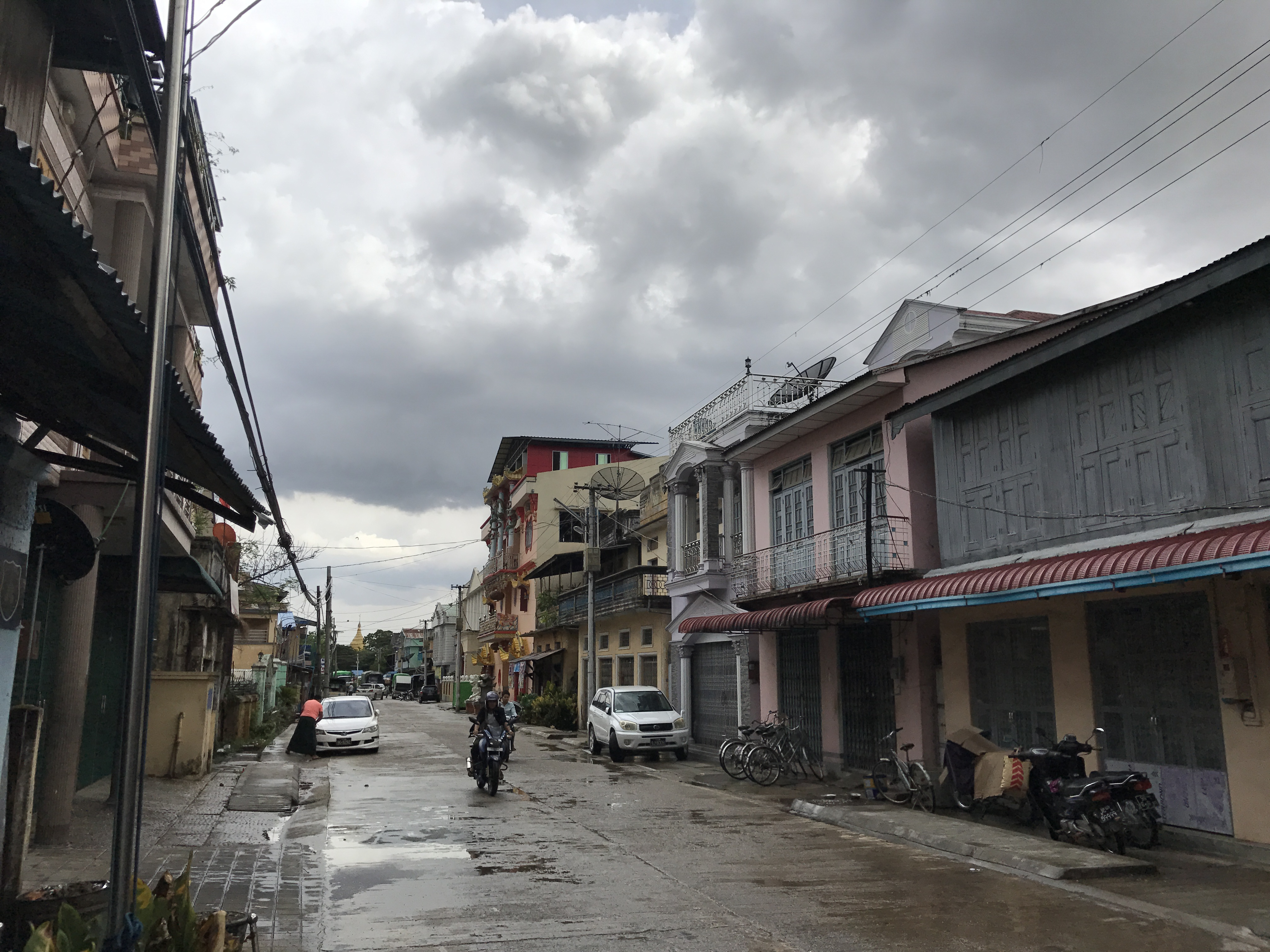
- View of street in Hinthada
- Interactive map of Hinthada
- Coordinates: 17°38′46″N 95°27′37″E
- Country: Myanmar
- Region: Ayeyarwady Region
- District: Hinthada
- Township: Hinthada

Area
  - Total: 7.376 sq mi (19.10 km^{2})
- Elevation: 56 ft (17 m)

Population (2019)
  - Total: 84,880
  - Density: 11,510/sq mi (4,443/km^{2})
  - Religions: Buddhism
- Time zone: UTC+6.30 (MMT)

Hinthada (Burmese: ဟင်္သာတမြို့; formerly Henzada) is a town located on the Irrawaddy River in Ayeyarwady Region, Myanmar. It is the principal town of Hinthada Township and Hinthada District. The trade of locally grown rice and grain goes through the port of Hinthada.

== Etymology and History ==
Historically, Hinthada was occupied by the Mon people, and was part of the Bagan Empire. According to local histories, the town was founded by Sithu I of Bagan who rested there on a trip up the Irrawaddy River. While building a temporary palace, his male hintha bird (a quasi-legendary species of goose or swan) passed away- causing him to name the area ဟင်္သာတ (Hintha-ta; lit. yearn for hintha). An alternative folk etymology says it was actually Sithu IV, who stopped in the area while fleeing the first Mongol invasion of Burma. Because he found the area lacking in food for his feast and called it ဟင်းလျာတ (hin-lya-ta; lit. yearn for entrees), which later morphed into Hinthada. The last folk etymology comes from the Mon language name for the danone palm, which grew in abundance in the area. In Mon, the palm is called Henzada and is the most likely origin for the town's name.

However, the town would be first mentioned historically during the conquests of Alaungpaya in the 18th century when it was taken from the Restored Hanthawaddy Kingdom. Henzada, as it was then called, was one of the first seven municipalities created by the Burma Municipal Act of 1874 during the British rule in Burma.

In the 2010s, the town did not see the dramatic changes in other cities during the 2011–2015 Myanmar political reforms and remained an archetypal agricultural trading town. However, in 2015, following the ousting of Shwe Mann from the Union Solidarity and Development Party, the town's local Htay Oo looked set to become the party's new leader and potential new president. However, locals opposed his re-election due to grievances regarding the military regime's monopolisation of rice milling and illegal land grabs. Htay Oo would go on to lose in the 2015 Myanmar general election, although remained the deputy chairman of the USDP.

== Demographics and Economy ==
Historical Population
Year	Hinthada	±%
1891	19,455	—
1973		—
1983	82,005	—
2014	79,431	−3.1%
2019	80,956	+1.9%
Source: Superintendent, Government of Lower Burma, Ministry of Labor, Immigration, and Population data, General Administration Department

In the 1983 census the city itself had a population of 82,005. By 2010, demographers estimated that it had grown to 170,312. However, the 2014 Myanmar Census found that the town had 79,431 people, although the surrounding township had a total population of 331,052 people.

There are various industries in the town of Hinthada to process food from the surrounding agriculture such as granaries. In addition, the town has other manufacturers, including an iron foundry and ice manufacturing plant. The town of Hinthada is also a major port for rice and tobacco grown in the surrounding area as well as a transportation hub for rail and road with Pathein and Yangon.

== Climate ==
The township is described as having three seasons (rainy, winter and dry) with temperatures ranging from 10°C to 41°C. Hinthada has significantly less rain than other parts of Lower Myanmar, in part due to its distance from the ocean. Temperatures, however, remain warmer during winter and cooler during the dry season compared to Yangon.

The area has a tropical savanna climate (Koppen: Aw).

Climate data for Hinthada (1991–2020)
Month	Jan	Feb	Mar	Apr	May	Jun	Jul	Aug	Sep	Oct	Nov	Dec	Year
Mean daily maximum °C (°F)	31.5 (88.7)	34.5 (94.1)	37.5 (99.5)	39.1 (102.4)	36.1 (97.0)	31.7 (89.1)	30.7 (87.3)	30.6 (87.1)	31.7 (89.1)	32.8 (91.0)	32.4 (90.3)	30.9 (87.6)	33.3 (91.9)
Daily mean °C (°F)	22.8 (73.0)	24.6 (76.3)	28.0 (82.4)	30.8 (87.4)	30.1 (86.2)	27.8 (82.0)	27.3 (81.1)	27.2 (81.0)	27.8 (82.0)	28.1 (82.6)	26.7 (80.1)	23.8 (74.8)	27.1 (80.8)
Mean daily minimum °C (°F)	14.0 (57.2)	14.6 (58.3)	18.5 (65.3)	22.5 (72.5)	24.2 (75.6)	24.0 (75.2)	23.9 (75.0)	23.9 (75.0)	23.9 (75.0)	23.5 (74.3)	20.9 (69.6)	16.8 (62.2)	20.9 (69.6)
Average precipitation mm (inches)	3.8 (0.15)	3.7 (0.15)	10.2 (0.40)	26.9 (1.06)	194.6 (7.66)	494.0 (19.45)	537.7 (21.17)	460.0 (18.11)	291.2 (11.46)	172.4 (6.79)	33.4 (1.31)	5.8 (0.23)	2,233.7 (87.94)
Average precipitation days (≥ 1.0 mm)	0.4	0.3	0.5	1.8	11.3	22.9	25.3	23.6	18.4	11.5	2.8	0.4	119.1
Source: World Meteorological Organization

== Education ==
The city is home to University of Computer Studies, Hinthada and Hinthada University and Technological University, Hinthada.

== Notable residents ==
- Mahn Ba Khaing
- Mahn Win Khaing Than
