= Hinthada District =

Hinthada District ဟင်္သာတခရိုင် Henzada District
- District
- location in Ayeyarwady region
- Coordinates: 17°38′0″N 95°30′0″E
- Country: Myanmar
- Region: Ayeyarwady Region
- Capital: Hinthada

Area
  - Total: 6,985.9 km^{2} (2,697.3 sq mi)

Population (2014)
  - Total: 1,138,710
  - Density: 163.00/km^{2} (422.17/sq mi)
- Time zone: UTC6:30 (MMT)

Hinthada District (Burmese: ဟင်္သာတခရိုင်; formerly Henzada District) is a district of Ayeyarwady Region Myanmar.

Henzada District, as it was originally known during British rule in Burma, was established as a separate district in 1854, before being reabsorded into Tharrawaddy District in 1861 and being recreated for the final time in 1878. In 1891, Lemyethna Township was moved to a new district, before being returned to the district by 1901. In 2022, the townships' northern townships of the district were split off into Myanaung District.

The district has 167 kilo-hectares of natural forest, of which 14 hectares (0.28%) was deforested between 2002 and 2023.

== Townships ==
The district contains the following townships:

- Hinthada Township
- Zalun Township
- Lemyethna Township (Laymyethna)

== Demographics ==
Historical Population
Year	Hinthada District	±%
1855	118,700	—
1861	209,400	+76.4%
1872	329,600	+57.4%
1881	367,654	+11.5%
1891	438,131	+19.2%
1901	484,558	+10.6%
1911	532,357	+9.9%
1983		—
2014	1,138,710	—
Source: Burma GazetteerMinistry of Labor, Immigration, and Population data,

In 2014, the district had 1,138,710 people.
