= List of villages in Kogi State =

Villages in Kogi State, Nigeria

This is a list of villages and settlements in Kogi State, Nigeria organised by local government area (LGA) and district/area (with postal codes also given).

== By postal code ==
| LGA | District / Area | Postal code | Villages |
|---|---|---|---|
| Ajaokuta | Ajaokuta | 263106 | Abedu; Abodudu; Achimopa; Adege; Adegu; Adogu; Ajaokuta; Anogi; Badoke; Bagana; Bataga; Egede; Gaduma; Ganaja; Garegu; Ichmwa; Idibo; Idire; Inara; Kporoko; Obangede; Ochebanyi; Ochimile; Odenu; Odire; Ogare; Ogirigiri; Ogodo; Ogunmagu; Ohunene; Onado; Onyekumi; Oruge; Owuni; Patesi; Shagana; Ukpaja; Ukpki; Unesi |
| Ajaokuta | Ebiya | 263104 | Ademe; Agarugu; Ajagu; Apanke; Ebiya; Epiri; Iriku Agiga; Iyasa; Ohuns; Okhebanyi; Ubatoto; Ubegiri |
| Ajaokuta | Egayin | 263105 | Achagana; Adogo; Egayin; Iloshi; Irunisechi |
| Ankpa | Ankpa | 270101 | Abache; Abo; Acherane; Adde; Aguma; Aka; Akwu; Ankpa; Atuma; Biraidu; Ebakpoti; Ede; Efiwo; Egbeche; Ejegbo; Ejinya-Abakpa; Ejinya-Efoje; Emanyi; Emedo; Emekutu; Emere; Enale; Enekpoli; Igbahala; Igocha; Ikanekpo; Ikebe; Imane; Lagos-Ochi; Ochi-Ofago; Ochinobi; Oda; Ofagele; Ofanwa; Ogaji; Ogbagede; Ogbaloto; Ogbopiala; Ogodo; Ojapata; Ojede; Ojelanyi; Ojogobi; Ojokodo; Ojuwo I; Ojuwo II; Okatikpe; Okeke-Ohia; Okenyi; Okolo; Omogu; Otoaikuru; Ubele; Uboji; Ubokpo; Uferene |
| Ankpa | Enjema | 270103 | Acharane; Achele; Afogamgam; Agbeneba; Agwumagwu; Ajiata; Ajitata-Ofobobo; Akpanaji; Alade-Ika-Efofe; Alufele; Alume; Aluro-Ogbowa; Awulu; Efiga-Ofangba; Efu-Ichala; Egboje; Emabu; Enabo; Enegbebe; Enjema; Eti-Aor; Gota; Gwoche; Ika; Ika-Ajeigbo; Ilori; Imanejo; Inye; Lokoja; Lokoja No 1; Lokoja No 11; Ocha-Agala; Ochekwu-Agojeju; Odagba; Ode-Etor; Odobi; Odokpono; Oforda Okolo; Ofugo; Ogbdobono; Ogboyaga; Ogedeagekpe; Ogo-Ekpo; Ojakpala; Ojate-Ejiga; Ojeke; Ojiuwo; Ojo-Ekpeje; Oju-Odele; Oju-Odeli; Okobo; Okpiko; Olufofo; Ukpolobia |
| Ankpa | Ojoku | 270102 | Agbodo; Ajobe; Akatanpia; Akunu; Awo-Agwugwuda; Awo-Akpali; Awo-Anekpa; Awo-Etikwo; Awo-Garage; Awo-Ojuwo; Bagele; Enjem; Eteda-Okaba; Icheke; Iyologu; Obaka; Odagba; Odogomu; Ofa-Anu; Ofokume; Ogbagbala; Ojeje; Ojoku; Ojuwo; Okwo-Idoko; Utala |
| Bassa | Ahutara | 272109 | Amara; Antara; Ibiroko; Ibozogi; Kpari; Kpari-Gumi; Kpokpo; Ogbazanyi; Ogbenka; Ogbonka; Okanga; Onyebu; Ozugbo; Zegu; Zube |
| Bassa | Akakana | 272105 | Akakana |
| Bassa | Akishamishi | 272106 | Akakana; Akishamishi; Akpaku; Ayede; Benebi; Butu; Changudu; Duru; Ebeje; Edigoshi; Gbudugbudu; Gobiji; Idare-Jegwere; Imora; Inigu-Tamarhi; Inigwu-Romo; Irigu-Omono; Iyede; Jegwere-Odule; Kipi; Kpeper-Buba; Kpepere; Maza; Nyimo; Paperi; Rioume; Usaman; Zavkama |
| Bassa | Akubasisi | 272104 | Baki; Dipengewu; Esule; Gbechi; Gbedikere; Gbegbereji; Kwokwoshi; Landu; Oguma; Sheria; Shushare; Suli |
| Bassa | Amo | 930117 | Janji; Kadamo; Kamare; Kasuru; Katako; Kawam; Kihang; Lalang; Lishin; Majaja |
| Bassa | Buhit | 930112 | Assak; Jebbu-Bassa; Kisallol; Kisayip; Unit |
| Bassa | Buji | 930118 | Gurum; Hwol Buji; Jere; Mista-Ali; Runfan Gomna; Sapai; Tariya |
| Bassa | Eforo | 272114 | Agbadakodo; Akotokum; Amewa; Dedebaji; Efere; Eforo; Egbo; Eroko;Egene; Egeneja; Woje;Emi-Ajoto;Emi-Amdi;Em-Agatu; Emi-Abme; Emi-Awale; Eroko; Atte;Emi-Bojule;Gbagbalagba; Koji; Kwebi; Tekumene; Togunye; Weobi |
| Bassa | Gboloko | 272112 | Adum-Woiwo; Agaida; Agedegi; Alaem; Amdi; Amonoku; Astagba; Effin; Ekido; Emi-Alemaka; Emi-Andrew; Emi-Dale; Emi-Tsado; Gboloko; Gendi; Nyankpo; Olowa; Tekete;Agabitsu;Ekido;Emi-guni;Akabe;Emi-Boci |
| Bassa | Ikende | 272110 | Ahalangayi; Akakana-Meru; Akapakude; Akpakudu; Arugbo; Ayebua-Kubiri; Bishu; Chilheteye; Cruori; Elegeji; Gbam; Gbende; Ikende; Ipegu; Iyade; Jato; Kwalamabana; Moragu; Ngenbu; Nupe; Odogba; Odule; Ohaifo; Ojuwo; Paruwa; Swegene; Ukeje; Wanwa; Zenyi |
| Bassa | Jere | 930119 | Bakin Kogi; Fuskan Mata; Jengre; Kadamo; Kaiyaka; Kalambai; Katare; P/Shamu; Rimi; Sarkishau; Zabollo; Zallaki |
| Bassa | Kakkek | 930111 | Bassa; Igbak; Kihang; Zagun |
| Bassa | Kishika | 930114 | Binchi; Binibob; Kikala; Kishi(I) |
| Bassa | Kpala | 272113 | Ajigidi; Akobo; Atakpa; Bidaji; Echewu; Eketa; Gande; Gbobe; Kpata; Kpatakpale; Shintaku; Shitte |
| Bassa | Kwall | 930116 | Gabia; Kimakpa; Kpasho; Nunhwie; Zarama; Zodu |
| Bassa | Mafara | 930115 | Bomo; Gurum; Rumfan; Tige |
| Bassa | Miango | 930113 | Daro; Jebbu Miango; Jebu; Ketago; Ta agba; Tahu; Zobwo |
| Bassa | Mozum | 272108 | Adinbeku; Edikeyi; Ehurama; Kabawa; Lundu; Mozu; Mozum-Waterside; Odogbo; Ogba; Oger |
| Bassa | Odeyyi | 272107 | Agodo; Biyabo; Chipu; Dikwo; Eshikwu; Gbogbolibo; Kara; Kebe; Kerike; Kpekpere; kpepere; Odenyi; Odugbo; Odulu; Ohete; Okudugu; Onyoji; Orekwe; Shemeje; Ujaw; Uwapa-Wete |
| Bassa | Ozonogulo | 272111 | Awana; Biyitwa; Daji; Gagba; Gbero; Karikwo; Kpanche; Orekwo; Uzhibu-Jimaza |
| Dekina | Birdu | 272103 | Abocho; Achigili; Adiele; Adoji; Adoma; Adum; Agada; Agbajo; Agidibai; Agojeju; Ahojori; Aje-Kelega; Ajebido; Ajegwuna; Ajieru; Ajijeina; Ajochidi; Ajogwoni; Ajomachi; Ajonu-Ota; Akpameta; Akpobi; Angwa; Araba; Atenokpe; Ayanka; Efikelegwu; Egbile-Ugani; Egomeha; Elika; Emewe; Emewe-Efopa; Olowa-Ajekeyi, Olowa-Etiaja, Olowa-Ofejiji, Olowa-Okwugwu, Gbokoluba; Ibolo; Igbadim; Kefi; Lokp; Ogbogbo; Okete, Ochipu, Okele, Ojogba; Ojukpo; Okwolo; Opada; Uchaikpele |
| Dekina | Dekina | 272101 | Adoloko; Adum; Agbada; Agbeji; Agojeju; Ajada; Ajediomku; Ajiolo; Ajuchaja; Akpelu; Akure; Alioko; Aliolo; Anama; Asbado; Ate-Uge; Dekina; Ebeje; Egudi; Eturekpe; Ireko; Itaima; Iyale; Jeri; Ochele; Odolu; Odu; Odu Okpakili; Odu-Ofomu; Odu-Ogboyaga; Oduate; Ofomu; Ofugo; Ofujiji; Ogaloto; Ogene-Enigu; Ojiakala; Ojuakala; Ojuapata; Ojuwo; Okete; Okpakili; Okpeyegede; Ologba; Onukpo; Songhai; Tandoma; Ugbabo; Uje; Ulaja |
| Dekina | Okura Egume | 272102 | Abejukolo; Acharu; Adumu; Agala; Agbeji; Ajagum; Ajugwumu; Alade; Aligi-Ado; Ameka; Ayangba; Chikoro; Egbole; Egume; Elubi; Iga; Ijoji; Itama; Lafia; Lakwi; Ochaja; Ochaji; Ofakaga; Ofalikpa; Ofanwa; Ofawuna; Ofejiji; Ofiugo; Ogbogodo; Ojapata; Ojikpadala; Ojuwo; Okura-Lafia; Okura-Sawmi II; Okure-Egume; Ola; Olaji; Olowa; Onichaigo; Onugba; Owolowo; Sanioko; Tuani-Oko |
| Ibaji | Onyedega | 271105 | Adgwu; Ajankoje; Ajitata; Ajmukoje; Akene; Akinia; Akpalobe; Akpanya; Akpiola; Akura; Alakwa; Alogwu; Amabo; Ani-Ocha; Aniocha II; Arrugo; Aya; Echango; Echeno; Efe; Ejule; Ete; Ibaji; Ibaoko; Ika; Ikenye; Ikola; Ikpogwu; Ikpoloko; Inene; Iteti; Iyano; Nokwa; Obale; Obele; Odakupu; Odeke; Odomomo; Ofanwa; Ofronla; Ogbagwu; Ogwu; Ojila; Ojueja; Okapanaji; Okwuonoko; Olla; Oluknodu; Onuabo; Onyedega; Orofuanefe; Ugbugbo; Ugwata; Ujeh; Unale; Odolu; Ayeke; Enweli; Odeke; Ujeh; |
| Idah | Idah | 271101 | Abujaga; Agalugbaje; Akpo; Akuta; Alade; Aladgbajadu; Alakome; Alimoke; Alla-Okweje; Angwajuma; Chekene; Ede; Ede-Adejoh; Edeke; Efuh; Ejofe; Ekwokata; Etoba; Ichala; Ichijenu; Idah; Idoma; Ijobe; Inene; Kaka; Lafi; Nwajala; Obajadaka; Ochijenu; Odobu; Odogu; Offa; Ofugo; Ogaine; Ogba-Dichi; Ogwojibo; Ohiji; Ojebe; Ojibgo; Ojigagala; Ojuba; Okeku; Okele-Agaldoko; Okele-Ocheje; Okele-Ohinem; Olaji; Onah; Onugwa; Onyemu; Ota; Ugwoda; Ukwaga |
| Igalamela-Odolu | Adoru | 271104 | Adoru; Aduku; Agbamofa; Agbokete; Agboni; Agejojo; Ajiongu; Ajonuche-Oko; Alaba; Alakwa; Amejekpo; Ameke; Aneke; Apata; Arefe; Ata; Ayi-Kpele; Ekpotoko; Emuchi; Epete; Eti-Akpacha; Ibochi; Igbope Okealuju; Ikare; Ikare-Ojefu; Imere; Obolimi; Ocheja; Ofakpa; Ofe-Anwa; Ofejiji; Off; Oforachi; Ogaji-Gwu; Ogane-offu; Ogbaligbo; Ogbe-Adige; Ogbogbo; Ogbolimi; Ojajuna; Ojete; Ojodoma; Ojokuta; Oko-Oma; Okpabioko; Okpe; Opada; Otobo-Adogulu; Ugbatugba |
| Igalamela-Odolu | Oforachi | 271103 | Abolinyagayaga; Achiokpa; Agamaka; Aguroko; Ajodanwu; Akinie; Akuba; Alade; Anambra; Angba; Apata; Atanegume; Buga; Eche-Aba; Eji-Elanyi; Eke-Aminenga; Emachi; Eto Alkura; Ihiame; Ikpokawo; Iyegu; Ofejiji; Ofobu; Ofodo; Ofokpiye; Oforachi; Ogbololi; Ogbomucha; Ogbotobo; Ogobogbo; Ogwomichi; Oji Omaji; Ojodu; Ojokuta; Ojuwo; Okagbo; Okaimili; Okeku; Oko-Agwu; Oko-Ikere; Okobu; Okoma; Okula-Ameji; Olefu-Oko-Tikpa; Olichekpe; Otochi; Ugbedomagu; Ukpekpele; Uro-Agada; Urodu; Utoro; Uwowo |
| Igalamela-Odolu | Ofulko | 271102 | Ajire; Ala-Akabe; Ala-Ogboyaga; Ala-Okpoga; Egbahieme; Etutu; Ikpudu-Kaji; Inene; Iyogbo; Obaloko; Ofuloko; Ogbajele; Ogoji; Ojuro-Afu; Okenya; Okopolo; Okpachala; Okpakpata; Okpo; Okpo-Iyoloko; Okpocti-Aja; Okuta-Eluhe; Orunu; Ujagba; Ukpologu |
| Ijumu | Ijumu | 261103 | Aduge; Agirigbon-Oke; Aiyegunle-Gbede; Aiyetoro-Gbede; Aiyere Ayere; Araromi-Gbede; Arima; Ayeh-Gbede; Egbeda Egga; Egbedsyere; Ekinrin-Adde; Ife; Iffe Tedo; Ifihafom; Igbolsyere-; Igbopin-Okeouju; Igo-Igere; Ikoyi; Iluagba; Iyah-Gbede; Iyamoye; Iyara; Kakuma; Odokoro-Gbede; Ogale-Ayede; Ogale-Idi-Oro; Ogidi; Okejumu; Okoro-Gbede; Origa; Oton-Ade; Otungba |
| Kabba-Bunu | Bunu | 261102 | Aberin; Aduratedo; Afotu; Agbadu; Agbede; Aghara; Aherin; Aiyegunle; Aiyetoro Kiri; Akutupa; Apaa; Are; Asuta; Ayede Apa; Edumo; Eshin; Guguruji; Idoyi; Igbo; Igha; Ighun; Igori; Ike; Ila; Ilogun; Iluke; Jeunro; Lesi; Monodu; Odo-Akete; Odo-Ape; Odogbo; Ofere; Oke; Oke Bukun; Oke-Offin; Oshomu Lekiri; Shado; Suku; Taki; Tata |
| Kabba-Bunu | Kabba | 261101 | Adesuwa; Aiyede Igunse; Aiyedun; Ayangan; Ebeleko; Egbeda; Egunse; Idde; Iyan; Kabba; Kakun; Obele; Odo-Bata; Ogbagbe; Ohekiti; Oke-Bata; Okedayo; Otun |
| Kogi | Koton Karifi | 260105 | Abuse Bassa; Achabo; Acheni; Adaba; Adabode; Adagima; Adama; Adamuro-Bassa; Adanya; Adigi-Gwari; Adiho; Adinjere; Adohu; Adoki; Afanya Bassa; Afoto Giwa; Agaboshi Gwari; Agaga; Agbarionya; Agyara; Ahoko; Aiyara-Gbanagana; Ajanagu; Ajita Bassa; Akabu; Akabu-Anuuya; Akori Bassa; Akpabi; Akpaku; Akpara; Akpasu; Akpo; Akpogu; Akpori Bassa; Akyara Bassa; Alagba; Allah; Amoko; Anegbaki; Aniura; Apashi; Araaba Arakpo; Arawe; Aseni; Ashishi; Ataki; Balu Akure; Bassa; Behu; Bibiroko; Bigitita Bassa; Birigo Bassa; Bishiwo; Bitizuba Bassa; Bori-Bassa; Chakaruku; Chigbeche Bisa; Chikara; Dagbogua; Dangare; Deneku-Bassa; Dillo Ashina; Dillo-Bassa; Dogbo; Duduku-Bassa; Dugbeji; Ebeje; Ebimikpo; Edeha; Ekpegi; Ekpurka; Enyikabu; Ereyi; Eshikabu; Eshikaku; Ete; Fereke; Gabo Nyenyi; Gainabi; Ganagedo; Gbagede; Gbange; Gbarada Bassa; Gbarake Bassa; Gbaramu-Bassa; Gbendu; Gbodege; Gbodogo; Gbogboro; Gbogu-Bassa; Gbugbudu; Geba Bassa; Gegu-Beki; Ginirnya; Gitata; Gozaki; Gujuro-Afuta; Gumbo; Guraro Bukwai; Ibbe Gwari; Idu Igbira; Iganuma; Igbogo Bassa; Igeneku Bassa; Ikumo; Irada; Iraki; Irako; Ironodu; Izene; Kaibe; Kallo; Karagba; Karitata; Kasuwa; Kekere; Kime Bassa; Kitikpomi-Bassa; Kokoshi; Koton-Karfe; Kpabkanki Bassa; Kpakpara Gakiya; Kpakpazi; Kpariku; Kpataku; Kpokpplobi Bassa; Ktakariku-Gwari; Kwakwa Goro; Kwelu; Kworaki; Kyanu Bassa; Lapai Bassa; Lasaniya; Logoji Gogo; Madalla Gwari; Maiwa bassa; Makeru; Makpa; Makpa Aubiriki; Mangoro Bassa; Manko Bassa; Merere Bassa; Mozu-Ete; Napoko; Narawanti; Noge; Nohi Gwari; Numai; Nyaba; Obaye Ubbo; Obobo; Odake; Odama; Odanyi Igbira; Odda; Odugba; Ofoko; Ogase; Ohimigusa; Ohimozi Bassa; Ohokanga; Ohwehuru Bassa; Ohwehuru Nupe; Oji; Okele; Okofi; Okpaka; Okparake; Okporudu Okppzogi; Oleyangana Igbira; Omani; Omoke; Onbu; Onzo; Orehi; Osakpa-Igbira; Osoku-Agbira; Osppridu; Osuku; Ozagi; Ozahi; Ozugbe; Pand Gbara; Poku; Rambo Bassa; Regbeta; Rekabeba Bassa; Riyiya Ganagana; Robomi; Rokpokpo-Gufaci; Sabo-Gwari; Samariga; Sansanyi; Sanunariyaa; Sasiri Bassa; Senseni; Seregyanama Bassa; Shagaya; Shedema; Shiden Bassa; Shikaku; Shimbabeji-Bassa; Sulumanyi Bassa; Taluwa Gwari; Tanabu; Tawari; Tazenyi Igbira; Tege; Tenege; Tototo Bassa; Toyi Gufaci; Tundun Wada; Tungan anamu; Tusa Bassa; Ubbe Bassa; Ugwe; Uhana; Ukwo; Umanyare; Unwari; Usodomi; Uwa; Werewere; Yelwa; Yinakoro Bassa; Zagana; Zarumai |
| Lokoja | Kakanda | 260103 | Abezumwa; Apata; Arah; Ashe; Budon; Buge; Doji; Eddo; Ere; Kompale; Nambata; Old Budon; Taji Bakin; Taji Chado; Taji Gberuko; Taji Kaji; Taraba; Tungangiwa |
| Lokoja | Kupa | 260104 | Abugi; Agini; Angbapu; Arakpo; Awumi; Bagi; Balagun; Batake; Bataku; Bughi; Dekugi; Eban; Eban Kaci; Ebo; Egba; Eggan; Ekan; Elagi; Fikara; Gbaci; Gbebu; Gbedumagi; Giri; Gugurugi; Gunji-Twa-Aki; Gwachi; Igban; Kapu; Kayinlo; Kinami; Koci; Kpaji; Kpapa; Kpoku; Kugbagi; Kumi; Kupa; Lagan; Lantsara; Lusuta; Majogun; Mami; Migegi; Mikugi; Miza; Mobo; Rambayi; Sampi; Sunawa; Vaji; Yaro; Yekaraji; Yinkara |
| Lokoja | Lokoja Rural | 260101 | Adankolo; Ahubana; Lokon-Goma; Meme-Bridge; Sarkin-Noma |
| Lokoja | Oworo | 260102 | Adogbe; Agbodo; Agboja; Akorilo; Akpami Oba; Akpangbe; Akpata; Akpayan; Aledu; Ayinoke; Banda; Choko-Choko; Ehinkin; Emda; Emu; Felele; Gbaude; Gbogbaribo; Ibaru; Idoshe; Igbolu; Igbonla Odo; Igiahako; Ihiji; Ihin; Iwa; Jakura; Jamata; Jiffo; Karara; Kugbani; Kuroko; Lolo; Mawo; Obajana; Odogbagba; Odohin; Odonun; Oduka; Ogbagbon; Ogbongboro; Ogoti; Ojoba; Okegba; Okeremi; Oko Tare; Okomba; Okpabu; Okpeko; Oku Ale; Omuwa; Osasara; Osewuru; Osoho; Otada; Otube; Otuga; Oyo; Tajimi; Tunga; Wara; Yashi Keya; Ynaduwa |
| Ofu | Gwalawo | 271107 | Gwalawo; IGALA- |
| Ofu | Itobe | 271109 | Adebu; Adumu; Adumuje; Agbenema; Agula; Ajango; Ajegwu; Ajo; Akunuba; Allo; Arokpa; Ataneguma; Egbala; Egonicha; Emicheje; Eyele; Eyele II; Ichapia; Itobe; Ofegede; Ofoke; Ofoyi; Ogboyaga; Ojimaji; Ojoma; Okogba; Okokenyi; Olokudu; Opitechia; Otebu; Ubewo; Ugbedu; Ukpo; Utagidi |
| Ofu | Ogwa | 271108 | Abejukolo; Agojeju; Agugu; Akopo; Akpopo; Alahha; Alaji; Alla; Alloma; Alobi; Alodo; Alojura; Aloko; Aloma; Amuna; Igwu; Aneke; Boko; Efaku; Egbagbenebe; Egube; Ejukulu; Ejule; Erewa; Iboko; Igalaogwa; Ijabe; Imagba; Inekpe; Laia-Ogugu; Lokoja; Obedomagu; Ochadamu; Ochadegbe; Ofante Omojo; Ofanti-Ojone; Offabo; Ofogu; Ogbagebe; Ogbulu; Ogene-Zaria; Ogonicha; Ojo; Ojuwo; Okagu; Okele; Okotete; Okpadodo; Okura; Okura-Ogwalala; Omodeda; Onicha-Igo; Ugbamaka; Ugbokonoko; Uleja |
| Ofu | Ugwo-Lawo | 271106 | Adikahane; Ahi; Aja-Kechi; Ajoda; Akpagidigbo; Akpameta; Akpodo; Alijobo; Aloji; Ayeye; Ebuyaji; Idoma; Igaojo; Igebije; Ijogo; Ikagbo; Ikalaba; Ikpalaka; Kukumaji; Memerebo; Obagada; Obagwu; Obubu; Ochadamu; Ofakaga; Ofanwa; Ofejiji; Ofokapi; Ofolijiawa; Ofolikpa; Oforachi; Ogbagba; Ogegume; Ojedegbe; Ojigba; Ojodu; Ojuwo; Ojuwo-Omachi; Ojuwolo; Okabo; Okpa; Okpe; Okpotume; Olichekpe; Olofu; Olukudu; Owalla; Ude; Ugbabo; Ugwolawo; Umoni |
| Ogori/Magongo | Ogori / Magongo | 263103 | Afuku; Aiyeromi; Akonoboro; Amuguru; Apata; Arawu; Arere; Ayetoro; Efan; Eke; Eku; Eku Daudu; Eku Oba; Emayin; Eni; Eni-Odan; Ibee; Ichede; Iken; Ileteju; Mangongo; Obatigben; Obinoyin; Ogbekete; Ogburu; Ogori; Ojubedi; Okesi; Oku; Omoda; Onumeba; Opakeru; Oshegbenene; Oshobane; Osobolo Oturu; Oyinowo; Udadegun; Ude; Ugbundun; Ugudun; Ugugu |
| Okehi | Eika | 264101 | Abobo; Aboze; Aguro; Ahosochi; Akovito; Aku; Apipa; Asango; Atami; Ebankoro; Ebikaturu; Eborere; Ege-Omavi; Eika Camp 1 and 2; Eika-Adagu; Eika-Ehi; Eika-Sdagu; Enyiosiretu; Eyika-Eba; Idajatu; Idokere; Ikaturu; Imanu; Inawe; Inochine; Inokoro; Ireapana; Irekovi; Iremariku; Irewagere; Irikuochakoko; Irusuegeze; Isuwen; Itakpe; Itakpe Camp Kogi Poly.; Obangede; Obiete; Obonibom; Ogogoro; Ohizenyi; Ohori; Ohuepe; Ohuoze; Okaito; Okaito Central; Okovito; Okuhapa-Eba; Okuhapa-Uvete; Okuhapa-Uveto; Okunya; Omavi; Oro/Osara Dam; Osade; Osara 1 and 2; Osiro Okechi; Osiro-Okehi; Otaneire; Otokiti Village; Otokoro; Otutu-Are; Ozare; Ozietune; Ozinete; Trekovi; Ubepe; Uboro; Uboro-Eda; Uhuepa; Uhuoze; Uro; Usungwe; Utoro; Zangodaji; Zariagi |
| Okehi | Ihima | 264102 | Adedoyika; Ahogede; Akene; Apamba; Arawa; Ebako; Ebako Uvete; Ebokechi; Ebozohu; Engwuhehe; Enyahevu; Epaka; Ewuru; Ichameba; Ichamete; Ichenya; Ichoko; Idarere; Ideziadobe; Idieziakuta; Idihiete; Idohazi; Ihuadu; Ijiwu; Ikinato; Ikuehi; Inareba; Inaruvete; Inata; Inuji; Irikuta; Irivo; Irivogo; Irivusechi; Itakata; Itutueba; Obeiba; Oboroke Eba; Oboroke-Uvete; Obuburu; Odaire; Odosi; Ogbeigba; Ogidi New Layout; Ohueta Eba; Ohuete Uvete; Okahachi; Okunya; Onyamina; Opopocho; Oride; Oride Uvete; Oruwhene; Osikoyi; Osikoyi Eba; Otutueba; Ozuvete; Udioyivo; Ugba; Uhwa; Ukako; Ukowa; Umenezi; Uto Ruku; Utobobo |
| Okene | Okene | 263101 | Acheze; Adegu; Agama; Agasa; Agimi; Bariki; Denku; Emene; Ide; Idoji; Inanup; Inoziomi; Inpyidara; Irewagere; Obassa; Ochebanyi; Ogud; Ohiama; Ohukede; Oka; Okene; Okengwen; Okuhepochi; Olu Odumi Otutu; Onyukoko; Orasie Chinchi; Orietosu; Orijah; Owere; Udi-Arehu; Udiegba; Upege; Upogoro |
| Okene | Okengwen | 263102 | Abuga; Agere; Agewa; Ere; Obehira-Egba; Obenira-Bete; Odenku; Ozuja; Ukpororo |
| Olamaboro | Imani | 270108 | Abo; Achipu; Adamu-Uabo; Afa Owobe; Afenegoma; Agaliga; Agaliga-Efabo; Ajitata; Akpoli; Akpoloko; Alawu; Amobia; Amoke; Barracks; Ebuloko; Ede; Efachipu; Efafo; Efagbo; Efaigele; Efakpa; Efekpe; Efiwo; Efofe; Efoko; Efoko-Igo; Epunobi; Epunoko; Erode II; Eroke I; Etafo; Eteke; Etutekpe; Idekpa; Igabije; Ikankweme; Ikpechi; Imani; Inele; Inwa; Iwilli; Iyodo; Mabenyi; Ododa; Oforo; Ofudu; Ogalobe; Ogbodo; Ogili; Ojakpama; Ojamagba Gbuduku; Ojamayigbachu; Ojamidoko-Ele; Ojoche; Ojodochai; Ojoko; Ojuwo; Okolododo; Okunene; Omelewu; Onogbo; Orinago; Ugbonoko; Uloko; Umgwa; Utoje |
| Olamaboro | Ogodu | 270109 | Achagbe-Adum; Adum-Afo; Adupi-Afo; Alokpo-Ikem; Aludu; Alugu-Emonoja; Amaka; Anyigba-Ogugu; Ega-Orinono; Ejule-Ofante; Ekelekwu; Emagaba No 1; Emagaba No 2; Emaka-Ofante; Emakpe; Emakpe-Uchola; Emenega-Achadu; Emonoji; Emonyokwu; Ikeke/Emagaba; Ikekwu Emanoji; Ikem; Ileke; Ofante; Ofante Adum; Ofante Centre; Ofode-Adum; Ogbafu-Ileke; Ogbodo-Adum; Ogene; Ogugu; Okegbi; Oko-Edi; Orinono-Ogugu; Unyi; Unyi-Emodu; Unyi-Ogene |
| Olamaboro | Okpo | 270107 | Abaeche-Iga; Adamaku; Ade; Adumu; Adumu Iga; Agala; Agbaduma; Ago; Agwodaba; Ajikabu; Akpagidigbo; Akpakpa; Alekwo; Alukwo; Amakpa; Atenegoma; Awodo; Eboyi; Efe-Oro; Efekpe Ekpeyeno; Efofe; Efuofofo; Enabo; Eti-Ede-Ugaru; Etiukwukoh; Etutekpe; Ibana; Ibeli Ade; Ichechele; Iga-Eti Ukwo; Iga-Ikeje; Iga-Ocheba; Iga-Ojuwo; Iga-Ugbamaka; Igoti; Inale-Etieke; Inele-Ugo; Ite; Obele; Odeifo; Odobu; Ofenwa; Offa; Ofobobo-Okpo; Ofogo; Ogbagede; Ogbe; Ogboyaga; Ogene-Iga; Ogodo; Ojamakogwu; Ojamapaimn; Ojamonogwu; Ojuwo-Ochekwu; Okpe; Okpo; Onugba; Opu; Otakpa; Otakwuihi; Otuapa; Owosho; Ubalu; Uefodo; Ugbogbo-Iga; Ugbologidi; Ugojo |
| Omala | Abejukolo | 270105 | Abejukolo; Ado; Adoka; Agbenema-Ife; Agojeju-Odo; Ajaja; Ajibu; Ajiyolo; Akpacha; Bagaji-Odfo; Bagana; Braidu; Bukami; Drisu-Village; Ebiradu; Echa; Efiwo; Ibado; Iga; Igaliwo; Ihiame; Ijali; Ikeffi; Ikpoba; Iyade; Jago; Kaduna Ife; Lato; Majenuwe; Obakume Aloko; Obakume-Ojadebo; Odamagu; Odmukpor; Odogba; Ofejiji; Ogadibo; Ogba; Ojadaga; Ojadama-Ojadoma; Ojaidu; Ojaja; Ojaji; Ojawulu; Ojedibo; Ojejima; Ojema; Ojenebi; Ojichekpa; Ojogori; Ojokpachi; Ojomakoji; Ojuwo; Okpatala; Oliya; Omagede; Opanda |
| Omala | Ife | 270106 | Agbada; Andemaja; Efe; Icheke-Odili; Icheke-Ojego; Icheke-Ojekewe; Icheke-Ojocholi; Icheke-Ojokpachi; Ichela-Ogeme; Ijoba; Ogbonha; Ogugudu; Ojademi; Ojochema; Ojodoma; Oko-Akwu; Okwiko; Okwugba; Olechu; Olokwu; Oti |
| Omala | Ogodu | 270104 | Abuja-Igaco; Abuja-Ogodu; Akpaha; Allah; Arku; Atokuja; Efekpe; Igodo; Ogodu; Ojeh; Ojiaji; Okaba; Oliya; Olla |
| Yagba East | Yagba North-East | 262101 | Amuro; Iddo; Idofin; Ijowa; Ilafin; Irunda; Isanlu-Itedo; Isanlu-Makutu; Isanlu-Mopa; Iye; Lofin; Odogbe |
| Yagba East | Yagba South-East | 262102 | Agi; Aginmi-Isale; Aginmi-Oke; Aiyede; Aiyegunde-Oke; Aiyegunle-Okeagi; Alu; Ejuku; Ife-Olukotun; Igbagun; Igbo-Ero; Ilai; Imela; Isao; Jege; Odo-Amu; Ogbon; Ohun; Okeagi; Oranre; Panyan; Takete-Isao |
| Yagba West | West - Yagba | 262103 | Akata; Assia; Egbe; Ejiba; Iddo; Igbaruku; Isanlu Esa; Iyamerin; Odo-Ara; Odo-Ere; Odo-Eri; Odosin; Ogbe; Ogga; Oke-Ere; Okoloke; Okoto; Okunran; Omi |

== By electoral ward ==
Below is a list of polling units, including villages and schools, organised by electoral ward.

| LGA | Ward | Polling Unit Name |
|---|---|---|
| Adavi | Okunchi/Ozuri/Onieka | Near Opotus Compound I; Near Opotus Compound II; Opposite Ohumahi Palace; Near Alabi's House; Lgea School Ozuri I; Lgea School Ozuri II; Near Ozuri Mosque; Opposite Ajoue's House; Opposite Sanni Ajoue's House; Front Of Victory Printing Okunchi I; Front Of Victory Printing Okunchi II; Lgea School Okunchi I; Lgea School Okunchi II; Lgea School Okunchi III; Lgea School Okunchi; Gdss Okunchi; Anyoke-Eba; Near Atto's Compound; Near Dansule's Compound; Open Space Near Dansule's Compound; Open Space Near Ochu's House Anyoke Eba; Near Alhassan's House Anyoke |
| Adavi | Ogaminana | Lgea School Ogaminana I; Lgea School Ogaminana II; Abadagi Street I; Abadagi Street II; Abadagi Street III; Lgea School Ogaminana (Prem. Sec) I; Lgca School Logaminina (Perm. Sec) II; Lgca School Logaminina (Perm. Sec) III; Front Of Court I; Front Of Court II; Maternity Centre I; Maternity Centre II; Postal Agency Revenu Office I; Postal Agency Revenu Office II; Lgea School Idatochi; Near Isah Atta's Compound; Near Badams Compound; Lgea School Ogaminana |
| Adavi | Iruvucheba | Near Suberu Okino I; Near Suberu Okino II; Near Obajimoh's Compound I; Near Obajimoh's Compound II; Near Jimoh Otaru's Compound I; Near Jimoh Otaru's Compound II; Near Idamu's Compound I; Near Idamu's Compound II; Near Asema's Compound I; Near Asema's Compound II; Back Of Court I; Back Of Court II; Open Space Near Obajimo's Compound |
| Adavi | Idanuhua | Near Aheruvo's Compound I; Near Aheruvo's Compound II; Idanuhua/Council Hall I; Idanuhua Dispensary; Postal Agency/Obuburu I; Postal Agency/Obuburu II; Near Alh. Adaemoh's House I; Near Alh. Adaemoh's House II; Near Yusufu Alabi's House; Near Akwengwu Community Bank; Open Space Near Alh. Adaemoh's Compound |
| Adavi | Adavi-Eba | Nurudeen Islamic School Adavi-Eba I; Nurudeen Islamic School Adavi-Eba II; Lgea School Adavi-Eba I; Lgea School Adavi-Eba II; Dispensary Quarters Adavi-Eba I; Dispensary Quarters Adavi-Eba II; Lgea School St. Paul Adavi-Eba I; Lgea School St. Paul Adavi-Eba II; Lgea Cath. Osoma I; Lgea Cath. Osoma II; Near Central Market I; Near Central Market II; Lgea Sch. St. Paul Adavi-Eba III |
| Adavi | Kuroko I | Lgea School I Ibeke I; Lgea School I Ibeke II; Lgea School II Ibeke I; Lgea School II Ibeke II; Lgea School III; C. S. S. Ibeke I; C. S. S. Ibeke II; C. S. S. Ibeke III; C. S. S. Ibeke IV; Opposite Adeika's House I; Opposite Adeika's House II; Meternity Centre Ibeke I; Meternity Centre Ibeke II; Opposite Obaro's House I; Opposite Obaro's House II; Near Yusufu Olowo's House; Near Ozigi's Compound Idogogo; Open Space Opp. Obaro's House |
| Adavi | Kuroko II | Cath. School Idakatapa I; Cath. School Idakatapa II; Cath. School Idakatapa III; Near Sadiku Obejara's Compound I; Near Sadiku Obejara's Compound II; Near Aliyu Niyamada's Compound I; Near Aliyu Niyamada's Compound II; Basic Health Centre Idakatapa I; Basic Health Centre Idakatapa II; Near Oricha's Compound Idakatapa I; Near Oricha's Compound Idakatapa II; Near Oricha's Compound Idakatapa III; Near Sule Ozovehe's Compound I; Near Sule Ozovehe's Compound II; Near Utohu Ogogo I; Near Utohu Ogogo II; Near Utohu Ogogo III; Beside Bello Atta's House I; Beside Bello Atta's House II; Beside Bello Atta's House III; Front Of Amodu Ejo's House; Open Space Near Aliyu Niyamda's House I; Open Space Near Sule Ozovehe's Compound |
| Adavi | Ino Ziomi/Ipaku/Osisi | Lgea School Osisi I; Lgea School Osisi II; Lgea School Osisi III; Lgea School Ipaku I; Lgea School Ipaku II; Lgea School Ipaku III; Near Nabenege's House I; Near Nabenege's House II; Near Nabenege's House III; Maternity Ipaku I; Maternity Ipaku II; Near Jatto's House I; Near Jatto's House II; Near Chegede's House I; Near Chegede's House II; Inoziomi Layout I; Inoziomi Layout II; Inoziomi Layout III; Lgea Sch. Osisi IV; Lgea School Ipaku IV; Open Space Near Nabenege's House; Open Space Near Jato' House |
| Adavi | Ikaraworo/Idobanyere | Lgea School Enyidudu I; Lgea School Enyidudu II; Lgea School Enyidudu III; G. S. S. Iresuhua I; G. S. S. Iresuhua II; G. S. S. Iresuhua III; Lgea School Iresuhua I; Lgea School Iresuhua II; Lgea School Iresuhua III; Lgea (Cath) Sch. Ikaraworo I; Lgea (Cath) Sch. Ikaraworo II; Lgea (Cath) Sch. Ikaraworo III; Lgea (Cath) Sch. Ikaraworo IV; Lgea School Iresuhua IV |
| Adavi | Nagazi Farm Centre | Lgea School Oziokutu I; Lgea School Oziokutu II; Lgea Cath. Sch. Nagazi-Uvete I; Lgea Cath. Sch. Nagazi-Uvete II; C. S. S. Ogaminana I; C. S. S. Ogaminana II; Lgea School Nagazi-Eba I; Lgea School Nagazi-Eba II; Basic Health Centre I; Basic Health Centre II; Basic Health Centre III; Lgea Sch. Cath. Nagazi-Uvete I; Lgea Sch. Cath. Nagazi-Uvete II; Lgea Rahama Sch. Nagazi I; Lgea Rahama Sch. Nagazi II; Lgea Rahama Sch. Nagazi III; Lgea School Aku I; Lgea School Aku II; Lgea School Atami; Dispensary Atami; Anglican School Osara; Lgea Cath. Sch. Osara I; Lgea Cath. Sch. Osara II; Irewagere; Zariagi (Kabba Junction) Lgea School I; Lgea School Irepeni; Lgea School Iresuare; Lgea Cath. School Nagazi-Uvete III; Zariagi (Kabba Junction) Lgea School II |
| Adavi | Ege/Iruvochinomi | Lgea Ang School Egge I; Lgea Ang School Egge II; Lgea Ang School Egge III; Lgea Ang School Egge IV; Lgea School Irivuochinomi I; Lgea School Irivuochinomi II; Lgea School Irivuochinomi III |
| Ajaokuta | Ebiya North | Lga Dispensary (I) Ebiya; Lga Dispensary (II) Ebiya; Lga Dispensary (III) Ebiya; Farm Centre Adu; Lgea School Epiri; Lgea School Okuhaobanyi |
| Ajaokuta | Ebiya South | Town Hall/ Area Ebiya I; Town Hall/ Area Ebiya II; Town Hall/ Area Ebiya III; Lgea School Ebiya I; Lgea School Ebiya II; Lgea School Apanko |
| Ajaokuta | Abodi/Patesi | Open Space I Eganyi; Open Space II Eganyi; Open Space III House; Lgea School I Eganyi; Lgea School II Eganyi |
| Ajaokuta | Ichuwa/Upaja | Beside Orere Abagi Square; Open Space I Ichuwa/Upaja; Open Space II Ichuwa/Upaja; Market Square Ineyere |
| Ajaokuta | Badoko | Open Space I Badoko; Open Space II Badoko; Open Space III Badoko; Open Space IV Badoko; Open Space V Badoko |
| Ajaokuta | Ogigiri | Open Space Ogigiri; Lga Dispensary Ogigiri |
| Ajaokuta | Adogo | Old Market Garage Adogo; Open Space Under A Tree Adogo; Open Space Adogo |
| Ajaokuta | Achagana | Open Space I Achagana; Open Space II Achagana; Open Space III Achagana; Open Space IV Achagana; Open Space V Achagana; Lgea School Achagana |
| Ajaokuta | Odonu/Unosi | Open Space Odonu; Open Space Unosi |
| Ajaokuta | Omgbo | Open Space Under A Tree Omgbo; Lgea School Omgbo I; Lgea School Omgbo II |
| Ajaokuta | Adogu/Apamira/Ogodo Uhuovene | Oguro/Apamira Village Square; Adogun Village; Onyiokumi Island; Adogu Station; Iyassa Village; Bauru/Uhuovene Village |
| Ajaokuta | Obangede/Ohunene/Ukoko Inye'Re | Lgea School I Upake; Lgea School II Upake; Lgea School III Upake; Obangede/Uhunene/Upake; Ineyere Village |
| Ajaokuta | Old Ajaokuta | Kilometer 18 Ajaokuta; Upper School I Ajaokuta; Down School Ajaokuta; Infornt Of Post Office Ajaokuta; Lga Dispensary Ajaokuta; Upper School II Ajaokuta |
| Ajaokuta | Ganaga/Township | Asco Pri. Sch. Geregu; Lgea Sch. I(A) Geregu; Lgea Sch. I(B) Geregu; Lgea Sch. II(A) Geregu; Lgea Sch. II(B) Geregu; Lgea Sch. Emi-Agbati; Lgea Sch. Ero Village; Lgea Sch. Kporoko Village; Lgea Sch. Ganaja Village; Nursery/Prim. Sch. African Camp; Community Centre I; Community Centre II; Ffn Camp/Junior Worker I; Ffn Camp/Junior Worker II; Asco Investra/Township; Sae Investra/Township I; Sae Investra/Township II; Post Office Asco Township I; Post Office Asco Township II; Lgea School Emi-Woro/G/Bassa; Jdp Camp Asco Township |
| Ankpa | Ankpa Township | Opulega, Beside Round About; Okpakpala, Open Space; Angwa Ogebe, Ogaji Village; Ankpa, Taiwo Road; Ankpa, Barrack 2 Opp. Burial Ground; Ankpa, R. C. M. School; Ankpa, Otukpo Road By Slaughter Slab; Angwa Hausawa, Near Market Open Space; Ankpa Sabongari, L. G. E. A. Central School; Ankpa, Abogede Ogaji Road; Ogaji Village, L. G. E. A. School, Ogaji; Enokpoli, Open Space; Ankpa, Angwa Ofodu; Ogaji, By Hassan Enape's House; Ankpa, Angwa Ede; Ankpa Infront Of Ankpa Hotels, G. R. A.; Ankpa, Ogaji Ojuwo; Ogaji Village; Ankpa By Motor Park |
| Ankpa | Ankpa Suburb I | Egbeche, L. G. E. A School; Ojede Centre, Open Space; Owelle; Owelle, Islamic Primary School; Ojelanyi L. G. E. A. School; Emanyi L. G. E. A. School; Emedo L. G. E. A. School; Ubokpo Open Space; Ojokodo, Open Space; Ojogobi, L. G. E. A. School; Enaleogo, Open Space; Ojachadu, Open Space; Ojede New Layout |
| Ankpa | Ankpa Suburb II | Aku, Near Water Tank; Aku, L. G. E. A. Primary School; Atuma, L. G. E. A. Primary School; Ogodo, By Market Square; Ogodo Atte, Open Space; Ogodo Ogane, Ogodo Near Water Tank; Agudoki, Open Space; Enale, L. G. E. A. School; Ojuwo Junction, By Market Square; Acharane, Near Market; Otukpo Ojille, L. G. E. A. School; Lagos Ochi, By Market Square; Ochi Ofago, Open Space; Achipu Open Space; Aku, Open Space; Ogodo, By R. C. M. School; Ogo Ojelanyi; Aloko Ofache L. G. E. D.; Ukpidobia Ogodo; Owala Ateh Near Mosque; Ujagbah Village Square |
| Ankpa | Ankpa I | Ejegbo, L. G. E. A. School; Ejegbo, Open Space; Emere, L. G. E. A. School; Emere Junction By Makurdi Road; Ikanekpo Okabo, Open Space; Ikanekpo Eteke, By Market Square; Agudoko Ikanekpo, Agudoko Old Market; Emekutu, Near Min Of Agric &Natural Resources; Uferane, Open Space; Eniele, L. G. E. A. School; Ojapata L. G. E. A. School; Etuekpe, Under Kola Nut Tree Ikanekpo; Obeya, Near Primary School, Ikanekpo; Emere Anekpa, Open Space; Alokoju, Open Space; Ikebe, Open Space; Ujodo, L. G. E. A. School, Alaka; Ikanekpoate Otukpo; Emere Efekpo, Open Space |
| Ankpa | Ankpa II | Allor, Court Premises; Abache, L. G. E. A. School; Amoke, L. G. E. A. School; Okenyi Amokpe L. G. E. A School; Ojibogo, Ojibogo Village; Uboji, L. G. E. A. School; Aguyaya, L. G. E. A. School; Ugbonobi, By Market Square; Ejinya Efofe L. G. E. A. School; Abakpa, Open Space; Ehecho, L. G. E. A. School; Ugolo L. G. E. A. School; Aguyaya By Market Square |
| Ankpa | Enjema I | Enabo, Open Space I; Enabo, Open Space II; Enabo, Open Space III; Odagba, Open Space; Enagbede, Under Mango Tree; Ogekpo, Open Space; Otakpa, Open Space; Efofe, Open Space; Anedu, By Efukpoka Anedu; Enjema Town, Open Space; Emabu, By Oforo Tree, Emabu; Okobo Atte L. G. E. A. School; Okobo Ogane, Okpiko Centre Open Space; Egula, Egula Centre; Emabu, Ogane Open Space; Odagba, Odagba Efoko; Ukpaja, Open Space; Alofe, Open Space; Enagbede, Open Space |
| Ankpa | Enjema II | Ukpolobia/Ojeke; Ojeke, Open Space; Ofugo, By Area Development Office I; Ofugo, By Area Development Office II; Ofugo Angwa Open Space II; Olufofo, Under Iroko Tree; Olufofo, Open Space; Afor, L. G. E. A. School Afor Gam-Gam; Afor, By Motor Park; Afor, Open Space; Odobi/Lokoja, Open Space; Egboje, Open Space |
| Ankpa | Enjema III | Ukege, Erane Near Ede Market; Ukege, Open Space; Aliboko, Open Space; Ogane Inye, Near Water Tank; Ogane Inye, Open Space; Ate Ojuno, Bob Alfa Primary School; Etutu, Open Space; Ojunaka, Open Space; Efacha, Open Space; Agbeneba, Open Space; Ojakpala, Open Space; Inye, By Inye Motor Park; Inye, Open Space |
| Ankpa | Enjema IV | Agumagu, L. G. E. A. School; Anulu, Open Space; Manejo L. G. E. A. School; Ajitata L. G. E. A. School; Ogede, L. G. E. A. School; Ofagba Lgea Pri Sch (Afibo/Akpanaji); Ika Center, L. G. E. A. School; Ika Efofe L. G. E. A. School; Ika Ilori L. G. E. A. School, Ichalla; Achele, L. G. E. A. School, Odokpono; Odokpodo L. G. E. A. School, Odokpono; Ichala, Open Space; Ochekwu, Open Space |
| Ankpa | Ojoku I | Akunu, L. G. E. A School Akunu; Odogomu, Market Square; Odogomu Centre, Near Vigillante Office; Bagele, Open Space; Agbodo, Opposite Market Square; Ajobe Odeto, Open Space; Ajobe Atte, By Round About; Agbodo, Open Space |
| Ankpa | Ojoku II | Okaba, L. G. E. A. School, Okaba; Okaba, Open Space; Okaba, Near Court Premises; Odagbo L. G. E. A. School; Ogbagbala, L. G. E. A. School; Ukpokwu, Open Space; Ukpaba, Open Space; Onupi, By Market Square |
| Ankpa | Ojoku III | Ojeje Efofe, Open Space; Ojoku Ojeje, Open Space; Akatanpia, Market Square; Inyologu Egboje, Market Square; Inyologwu Ogoba, Open Space; Ediya, Open Space; Ojeje Atekwo, Open Space; Inyologwu Ogoba, Market Square |
| Ankpa | Ojoku IV | Awo Akpali Lgea School; Awo Ojuwo, Lgea School; Awo Efiga Rcm School; Awo Akukuda By Market Square; Awo Akpali By Market Square; Awo Udaba Open Space; Awo Erechi Open Space; Awo Efagbo, Near Primary School; Awo Anekpa, Near Primary School |
| Bassa | Akuba I | Oguma Tuzuba Lgea Central School, Oguma; Oguma Mahauta Open Space Near Abattior Oguma; Shashara Open Space; Lando Tuzuba Opposite G. S. S.; Sheria II Open Space Sheria; Sheria IV Front Of R. C. M. School I; Gbegbereji Village Open Space; Dinengewu/Bissau Open Space Dinengewu; Gbechi Lgea School Gbechi; Kwokwoshi, Kwokwoshi; Gbedikere Open Space Gbedikere; Esule Open Space Esule; Sheria IV Front Of R. C. M. Shool II |
| Bassa | Akuba II | Odenyi Lgea School Odenyi; Okudugu Lgea School Okudugu; Odulu Village Open Space Odulu; Echukwu Lgea School Echukwu; Ujua Lgea School, Ujua; Koriko I Open Space Koriko; Koriko II, Lgea School Koriko; Keteshi, Open Space Keteshi; Odugbo Lgea School Odugbo; Agodo Lgea School, Agodo; Kporo Open Space Kporo; Onyoji-Wapa-Wotu L. G. E. A. School Onyoji; Aloko Open Space Aloko; Okete, Open Space Okete; Ochipu Open Space |
| Bassa | Ayede/Akakana | Akakana I Lgea School, Akakana; Akakana II Gss Field, Akakana; Kekure Lgea School, Kekure; Rivine-Ukuya Lgea School Rivine-Ukuya; Jegwere Open Space Jegwere; Inigu-Omono Lgea School Inigu-Omono; Paruwa-Swegene Lgea School Opaluwa; Abutu I Open School Abutu; Ayede Main Open Space Ayede; Imowa-Buba Open Space Imowa; Changudu/Suma Lgea School; Inigu-Tamazhe Lgea School Inigu-Tamazhe; Zharikama Lgea School Zharikama; Ebenehi Open Space Ebenehi; Paruwa Swegene Lgea School |
| Bassa | Ozongulo/Kpanche | Kpanche I Lgea School Kpanche; Kpanche II Open Space Kpanche; Gagba Lgea Sch. Gagba; Awawa Open/Space Awawa; Karukwo Lgea School Karukwo; Byintwa/Daje Open Space Byintwa |
| Bassa | Ikende | Ikende I Lgea School Ikende; Ikende II Near Market Square; Kpokudu Open Space Kpokudu; Odulu Open Space Odulu; Ugbende Open Space Ugbende; Gbamu Lgea School Gbamu; Zenyi Lgea School Zenyi; Wamua Lgea School Wamua; Elegeji Lgea School Elegeji; Wussa Uzhibu (Aguma) Lgea School Wussa Aguma; Wussa Uzhibu (Rome) Open Space Wussa Rome; Odulo Open Space Odulo |
| Bassa | Gboloko | Gboloko I Open Space; Gboloko II Lgea Central School Gboloko; Adum-Woiwo Lgea School Adum-Woiwo; Emi-Boci Lgea School, Emi-Boci; Akabe-Emi-Lafia Open Space Akabe; Olowa Near Market Square Olowa; Effin Lgea School, Effin; Emi-Dedeba Lgea School Emi-Dedeba; Ekido Open Space Ekido; Takete Lgea School Takete; Atsagba-Agedegi Open Space Atsagba; Emi-Dale-Anikao Open Space Emi-Dale; Emi-Audu Open Space Emi-Audu; Emi-Eronu Lgea School Emi-Eronu; Nyankpo Open Space Nyankpo; Emi-Akpamo - Yakubu Open Space Emi-Akpamo |
| Bassa | Kpata | Gbobe Open Space Gbobe; Ecewu Lgea School Ecewu; Shintaku Main Lgea School Shintaku; Emi-Guni Open Space Near The Clinic Emi-Guni; Emi-Abaida Open Space Emi-Abaida; Kpata (Main) Lgea School Kpata; Kpata Kpale Lgea School Kpata Kpale; Atakpa Lgea School Atakpa |
| Bassa | Eforo | Eforo Lgea School, Eforo; Atte-Togumeye Lgea School; Kpobi Open Space Kpobi; Dodogbagi Open Space Dodogbagi; Egeneja Open Space; Egbo Open Space Egbo; Koji Lgea School Koji; Eroko/Abom Lgea School Eroko; Koji Comm. Sec. School Koji |
| Bassa | Mozum | Mozum Sabon Gari Lgea School Mozum; Mozum Water Side Open Space; Kabawa Open Space Kabawa; Adimbeku Lgea School Adimbeku; Ogba Lgea School Ogba; Edikeyi Open Space; Mozum Sabon Gari G. S. S. Mozum |
| Bassa | Ozugbe | Ozugbe I Lgea School, Ozugbe; Biroko Lgea School, Biroko; Autara Lgea School, Autara; Omara Lgea School, Omara |
| Bassa | Buhit | Oguma Tuzuba Lgea Central School, Oguma; Oguma Mahauta Open Space Near Abattior Oguma; Shashara Open Space; Lando Tuzuba Opposite G. S. S.; Sheria II Open Space Sheria; Sheria IV Front Of R. C. M. School I; Gbegbereji Village Open Space; Dinengewu/Bissau Open Space Dinengewu; Gbechi Lgea School Gbechi; Kwokwoshi, Kwokwoshi; Gbedikere Open Space Gbedikere; Esule Open Space Esule; Sheria IV Front Of R. C. M. Shool II |
| Bassa | Gabia | Akakana I Lgea School, Akakana; Akakana II Gss Field, Akakana; Kekure Lgea School, Kekure; Rivine-Ukuya Lgea School Rivine-Ukuya; Jegwere Open Space Jegwere; Inigu-Omono Lgea School Inigu-Omono; Paruwa-Swegene Lgea School Opaluwa; Abutu I Open School Abutu; Ayede Main Open Space Ayede; Imowa-Buba Open Space Imowa; Changudu/Suma Lgea School; Inigu-Tamazhe Lgea School Inigu-Tamazhe; Zharikama Lgea School Zharikama; Ebenehi Open Space Ebenehi; Paruwa Swegene Lgea School |
| Bassa | Jengre | Ikende I Lgea School Ikende; Ikende II Near Market Square; Kpokudu Open Space Kpokudu; Odulu Open Space Odulu; Ugbende Open Space Ugbende; Gbamu Lgea School Gbamu; Zenyi Lgea School Zenyi; Wamua Lgea School Wamua; Elegeji Lgea School Elegeji; Wussa Uzhibu (Aguma) Lgea School Wussa Aguma; Wussa Uzhibu (Rome) Open Space Wussa Rome; Odulo Open Space Odulo |
| Bassa | Kadamo | Gboloko I Open Space; Gboloko II Lgea Central School Gboloko; Adum-Woiwo Lgea School Adum-Woiwo; Emi-Boci Lgea School, Emi-Boci; Akabe-Emi-Lafia Open Space Akabe; Olowa Near Market Square Olowa; Effin Lgea School, Effin; Emi-Dedeba Lgea School Emi-Dedeba; Ekido Open Space Ekido; Takete Lgea School Takete; Atsagba-Agedegi Open Space Atsagba; Emi-Dale-Anikao Open Space Emi-Dale; Emi-Audu Open Space Emi-Audu; Emi-Eronu Lgea School Emi-Eronu; Nyankpo Open Space Nyankpo; Emi-Akpamo - Yakubu Open Space Emi-Akpamo |
| Bassa | Kakkek | Gbobe Open Space Gbobe; Ecewu Lgea School Ecewu; Shintaku Main Lgea School Shintaku; Emi-Guni Open Space Near The Clinic Emi-Guni; Emi-Abaida Open Space Emi-Abaida; Kpata (Main) Lgea School Kpata; Kpata Kpale Lgea School Kpata Kpale; Atakpa Lgea School Atakpa |
| Bassa | Kasuru | Eforo Lgea School, Eforo; Atte-Togumeye Lgea School; Kpobi Open Space Kpobi; Dodogbagi Open Space Dodogbagi; Egeneja Open Space; Egbo Open Space Egbo; Koji Lgea School Koji; Eroko/Abom Lgea School Eroko; Koji Comm. Sec. School Koji |
| Bassa | Kimakpa | Mozum Sabon Gari Lgea School Mozum; Mozum Water Side Open Space; Kabawa Open Space Kabawa; Adimbeku Lgea School Adimbeku; Ogba Lgea School Ogba; Edikeyi Open Space; Mozum Sabon Gari G. S. S. Mozum |
| Bassa | Kishika | Ozugbe I Lgea School, Ozugbe; Biroko Lgea School, Biroko; Autara Lgea School, Autara; Omara Lgea School, Omara |
| Dekina | Dekina Town | Okikili/Ogbonihia Open Space; Sabongari Ate Dekina Lgea School; Sabongari Main Market Dekina; Ogane Dekina, Open Space; Ogane Dekina II Anglican Prim. School; Ogane Dekina III Near Olowa Roundabout; Tudun Wada Open Space; Udaba Dekina I Rcm Primary School; Ajekeyi Open Space; Ajibedo Open Space; Ogege, Open Space; Okele Centre Of The Village; Okete Along Abo Jonwa Road; Akpelu Open Space; Udaba Dekina II G. D. S. School; Olowa Near Bore-Hole, Olowa |
| Dekina | Iyale | Ogane Iyale Ulaja Road Iyale; Ate Ojuwo Lgea School; Etiaja Main Market Iyale; Owala Iyale Open Space; Ajedime Opposite Water Pump; Ugbabo Ojoda Market Square; Ulaja, Open Space; Etutekpe Angwa I Market Square; Ate-Uge, Open Space; Adumu Ajadike, Open Space; Ikpakpala Lgea Primary School; Atochi, Open Space; Ajidenyi, Open Space; Ologba I G. S. S. Ologba; Ologba II Lgea Prim. School; Ologba III Lgea Prim. School; Etutekpe Angwa II, Open Space |
| Dekina | Emewe | Emewe Opada I Open Space; Emewe Opada II Lgea Prim. School; Emewe Odu Open Space; Emewe Ofopa I Open Space; Emewe Ofopa II Lgea Prim. School; Okatakpokpo Open Space; Adoji Open Space; Ajodomodo Open Space; Ajomede Open Space; Ajijemu Centre Of The Village; Ajugbadaligi Open Space; Akpobi Open Space; Onyakoji Open Space; Ofojo Open Space; Efinwa/Ogugu Open Space; Achigili Open Space; Agwidu/Ajakaya Open Space; Ajomonubi Open Space; Emakoji Open Space |
| Dekina | Odu I | Odu Ogboyaga Market Square; Odu Ofugo Open Space; Ogbaloto/Olubojo At The Junction Of Ogbaloto; Ajakagwu Open Space; Okpakili Ogane Open Space; Okpakili Ate Open Space; Ogodanya Lgea Prim. School; Odu Adekpa Open Space; Ajaruwa Eke Lgea Prim. School |
| Dekina | Odu II | Ochele Open Space; Odu-Ate Lgea Prim. School; Odu-Ofomu Lgea Prim. School; Ajagwumu Lgea Prim. School; Okabo Open Space; Ajikpome Open Space; Ajiolo-Ojiaji I Market Square; Ajiolo-Ojiaji II Lgea Prim. School; Okpuyegede Lgea Prim. School; Odu-Anana Open Space; Odu-Igegeli Open Space |
| Dekina | Abocho | Barrack I Area Court; Barrack II Lgea Prim. School; Ajakeya Near Ibobo-Emewe Junction; Ajobaje Open Space; Ibobo Open Space; Odomebie Open Space; Ajiolo Ofagbo Open Space; Ofoda Open Space; Ojukpo - Open Space; Ofafu Open Space; Ojogba-Ajada Lgea Prim. School; Ajekelaga Cmml Prim. School; Alokoli Lgea Prim. School; Ajonoja Open Space; Okowowolo Open Space; Ajedimoku Lgea Prim. School; Okakwu Lgea Prim. School; Adiyele Lgea Prim. School; Ajiolo Ofalemu Open Space; Ajiolo Igademu Lgea Prim. School; Ajegwuna Near Cmml Church; Ate-Ajopaluwa Open Space; Biraidu Open Space; Ajonugbalegu Open Space; Araba Idoko Open Space; Araba Salifu Lgea Prim. School; Araba Abilo Open Space; Ogbobutu Lgea Prim. School; Barrack III Market Square |
| Dekina | Ogbabede | Eniji Anefu Open Space; Olowa Under Big Tree, Open Space; Agbajo Behind Town Hall; Opada Opp. Town Hall; Elika Lgea Prim. School; Ajadukwu Open Space; Udanebiomi Open Space; Ajedibo Ofuloko Open Space; Ofanwa Ajabutaji Lgea Prim. School; Ajatokolo Open Space; Ajelele Open Space; Efikelegu Open Space; Ajogwoni Lgea Prim. School; Ajatama Open Space; Ajigbu Open Space; Ogeneja Open Space; Opada Agada Near Grinding Place; Ofawulu Open Space; Ajudacha Open Space; Agili Open Space; Ajakoga Open Space; Ajayegba Open Space; Atanegoma Open Space; Ajita/Ochegegbe Open Space; Agojeju Ajora Open Space; Ogbogbo Open Space; Agada Lgea Prim. School; Ajoluku Open Space; Ajogala Open Space; Ajadako Open Space; Ajochidi Open Space |
| Dekina | Adumu Egume | Barrack I Motor Park Egume; Barrack II Nursery Prim. School; Efakwu-Efekpe Opp. Turaki's Clinic; Ogene Left, Open Space I; Ogene Left, Open Space II; Adumu, Open Space; Acharu, Open Space; Akwu Ijoji, Open Space; Ijoji Egume, Open Space; Owala Ogogba, Open Space; Alokegbe I, Open Space; Efikpo, Open Space; Barrack III Open Space; Alokegbe II Open Space |
| Dekina | Ojikpadala | Ojikpadala, Open Space; Agbeji Ojikpadala, Open Space; Ojuwo Ajonuchegbo, Open Space; Alade, Open Space; Abejukolo, Open Space; Ochaja I, Open Space; Ochaja II Boy's Sec. School; Ewune Lgea Pri. School; Ofejiji, Open Space; Okagu, Open Space; Agbeji Ojikpadala II Open Space |
| Dekina | Anyigba | Obeya Kekele, Open Space; Obeya Lile, Open Space; Iji Right, Open Space; Iji Left, Open Space; Odieto, Open Space; Ajetachi Opp. Abuch Agi's House; Omedo I, Open Space; Oganaji Lgea Prim. School; G. R. A. Anyigba Cmml Prim. School; Etiaja Junction I, Open Space; Agbenema, Open Space; Olofu, Open Space; Ofejikpi I, Open Space; Ofe-Uloko, Open Space; Agbeji, Open Space; Agala-Ogane Lgea Prim. School; Agala-Ate Opp. Catholic Church; Ofagolo, Open Space; Adiyele, Open Space; Aja Gedume, Open Space; Ofanili, Open Space; Ofejikpi II, Open Space; Ojofu Etikpolo, Open Space; Agudoko, Open Space; Atanegoma Centre Of The Village; Omedo II, Open Space; Etiaja Junction II, Open Space |
| Dekina | Okura Olafia | Okura Olafia Market Square; Ajare Adaji, Open Space; Sawmill, Open Space; Egboje, Open Space; Ofanwa, Open Space; Ogene-Igbobe, Open Space; Elubi Etiaja Cmml Prim. School; Elubi Ejefu, Open Space; Itama Ate I, Open Space; Ogbogodo Lokoja, Open Space; Ogbogodo Ojuwo, Open Space; Ofante, Open Space; Agudoko, Open Space; Jericho, Open Space; Itama Ate II Lgea Prim. School |
| Dekina | Ogane Inigu | Etiaja/Shoto, Open Space; Aloko Ofemagolo, Open Space; Otih Centre Of The Village; Ugbabo, Open Space; Odoloko, Open Space; Ogane Uge Centre Of The Village; Ojiyabanawo, Open Space; Agbada, Open Space; Edede, Open Space; Ojuwo Aloko, Open Space; Ojiapata, Open Space; Agojeju, Open Space; Efichala, Open Space; Egude, Open Space; Ojeh, Open Space; Ebeje Owala, Open Space; Ebeje Erabo, Open Space |
| Ibaji | Odeke | Ihile/Omakene/Omagbogwu, Open Space; Agwohi/Obiebo/Omatoji I, Open Space; Omatoji II; Omanayo, Open Space; Omanegedu I, Open Space; Omanegedu II, Open Space; Odeke's Open Space; Omekiya I & II, Open Space Odeke; Omecho I Beside Postal Agency Odeke; Omecho II & III Omecho Public Square; Iramura/Uru, Open Space; Omekiya III, Open Space; Omagacha I, Open Space; Omagacha II & III, Open Space; Omaba I & II, Open Space; Omachi I & II, Open Space; Odeke's Place Beside Onu Odeke's Frontage; Omekiya I & II Open Space Omekiya II |
| Ibaji | Ujeh | Ujeh Town Ujeh Town Hall; Ujeh/Aluaga/Ereijimi-Open Space Aluaga; Olukudu/Ikposu/Adagwo Olukudu; Ichala- Ujeh - Lgea School Ichala Ujeh; Irue/Arah - Lgea School Arah; Ikah - Otumale Hall; Adedone/Odoeyo Town Hall; Iregwu/Omaiye - Iregwu Town Hall; Odochala - Town Hall; Uchuchu I Market Square; Uchuchu II Omatawa Town Hall; Omatawa Uchuchu-Omatawa Open Space; Imia Uchuchu I. Imia Town Hall; Imia Uchuchu II Okoche Open Space; Olukudu/Ikpogu/Adagwo - Open Space Adagwo |
| Ibaji | Iyano | Ejofe - Town Hall Ejofe; Iru I. - Ikwu Hall Iru; Iru II - Iru; Aluaja I Town Hall Aluaja; Aluaja II Okpatawo Clan Hall; Itale I - Town Hall; Itale II / Itale; Ishi Ishi Town Hall; Ikaka- Iyeke Town Hall; Abujaga - Open Space; Inemeh Town Hall Inemeh; Akwuro - Open Space; Ikpeko/Adane - Open Space; Amida/Iru - Itakpa Play Ground |
| Ibaji | Akpanyo | Odolu I - Odolu Town Hall; Odolu II- Public Square; Oti Enwali - Open Space Oti; Igbenwe/Odogwu - Open Space Igbenwe; Ijifu Enweli - Open Space Ijifu; Amaja I - Town Hall Amaja; Amaja II - Open Space; Amaja III - Open Space; Iyalo I & II Open Space; Ajamaja - Open Space; Ofoko - Open Space; Onwunyo - Open Space; Ogbodo - Open Space; Ayeke New Site - Open Space |
| Ibaji | Unale | Obomi Oguduhi - Open Space; Obomi Ofayeke- Open Space; Obomi Ofano - Open Space Okpono; Ofanawo Otoli - Open Space Otoli; Ofanawo Ogbejuna- Open Space; Ofanawo Iyegewu - Open Space; Ola Unale - Open Space; Orube Okure - Grade II Area Court's Frontage; Orube Atokina Near Atokina Open Space; Ofokpa Ofokpa's Frontage; Igboligbo Okpala Near Okpala Igboligbo; Igboligbo Okpalomu Near Okpala Okpalomu |
| Ibaji | Ojila | Anika Town Hall Anika; Anocha Oba Open Space Uchia; Anedima Anocha Open Space Okpochu; Anocha Odiokpa Odiokpa Town Hall; Anocha Inali Uchia Inali Open Space; Imia Kent Odobo Uchia Odobo Open Space; Imia Town Hall Imia; Iyagba I Near Enwunchola's Frontage; Iyagba II Iyagba Town Hall; Olugu I Olugu Town Hall; Olugu II D. O's Office Frontage; Ikana I Beside Ubgaje' Forntage; Ikana II Town Hall Ikana; Omaina Ebonale -Town Hall; Emabo Ebonale - Town Hall; Omataka - Town Hall |
| Ibaji | Ejule | Ugbaga Ejule Onu - Town Hall Ejule Onu; Itakedu/Ohiele Ejule Onu - Open Space Itakedu; Ichagba- Public Square Ichagba; Odogba - Town Hall Odogba; Nwajala I Beside Town Hall Nwajala; Odobo - Town Hall Odobo; Ichala/Ajegwu - Open Space; Okpe/Iwala Open Space; Ohiale Ejule - Ojebe - Open Space Ohiele; Ogado - Town Hall Ogado; Obala/Itakpala - Open Space; Itakedu - Itakedu Town Hall; Agbagba/Igbegbe - Open Space; Uteno/Anokpe - Town Hall; Odogwu - Odogwu Town Hall; Nwajala II Open Space |
| Ibaji | Ayah | Ayah I - Okwehi Town Hall Ochata; Ayah II - Oga Town Hall; Ayah Achala, Open Space; Ayah Amonu - Ayah Amonibo Town Hall; Itah I -Open Space; Itah II - Open Space; Imachiga - Town Hall; Odomomoh - Lgea School Odomomo; Okpu - Open Space; Ojiala, Open Space; Onugwa- Town Hall; Ikade/Ojigbolo - Open Space; Iramawa - Open Space; Ojamukoje - Town Hall Ojamukoje; Ogwu - Aja- Open Space |
| Ibaji | Analo | Elele Atiko - Elele Public Square; Ukpotu Elele - Lgea School Ukkpotu; Agolukwu-Open Space Agolukwu; Onoli Obale - Open Space Onoli; Oddogwu Obale - Odogwu Play Ground; Ekwaja/Ohiemi Ekanyi- Open Space Ekwaja; Ameh Ochenya Ekanyi - Lgea School; Ekanyi Camp - Ekanyi Play Ground; Affa I - Lgea School Affa; Affa II - Public Square Affa; Ageju Ojo - Lgea School Ageju Ojo; Orogwu - Lgea School Orogwu; Ojikwu - Lgea School Ojikwu; Okogbo - Lgea School Okogbo |
| Ibaji | Onyedega | Atiko - Town Hall Atiko Ogane; Ojuba - Ojuba Town Hall; Onyedega I- Open Space; Ijogono -Town Hall Ijobono; Ogaine Ocheja - Town Hall; Ogaine Ofuloko - Town Hall; Ogaine Okoliko-Open Space Ogaine; Itoduma - Town Hall Itoduma; Ofobo - Town Hall Ofobo; Ogwojibo - Town Hall Ogwojibo; Ottah - Lgea School Ottah; Ukponu - Town Hall Ukponu; Agaligbojo - Lgea Agbaligbojo; Onyedega II - Open Space Onyedega |
| Idah | Igalaogba | Opp. Vip Lodge, New Gra-Idah; Open Space, Onah I; Open Space, Onah II; Open Space, Idoma; Opp. Roundabout, Ayija Achanyata; Open Space, Near Inikpi Clinics; Open Space, Near Texaco, Igalogba New Layout; Omepa Lgea School Premises; Open Space, Technical School |
| Idah | Owoli Apa | Ubomu/Oyifu, Open Space Ubomu; Open Space, Angwa Jama'a; Okete Ocheje/Ugbola, Open Space; Under Water Tank, Woli-Apa; Open Space, Okotonowa; Open Space, Alla-Ogbajadu |
| Idah | Igecheba | Agaidoko, Open Space, Agaidoko; Open Space, Okete Olimene; Open Space, Old Gra; Open Space Behind Min. Of Works; Near Works, Idah Central; Open Space, Oketekwe |
| Idah | Ukwaja | Open Space, Ukwaja I; Open Space, Ukwaja II; Open Space, Idah Club; Open Space, Women Resource Centre; Qim Prim. School, Open Space, Qim School; Open Space, Ofiji I; Open Space, Ofiji II; Open Space, Iscc Premises; Open Space, Angwa Ayegba; Open Space, Angwa Ategune; Open Space, Inachalo; Open Space, Angwa - Oweye; Open Space, Angwa Utoko |
| Idah | Ogegele | Open Space, Efulu; Open Space, Ogegele I; Open Space, Ogegele II; Lgea School, Alla-Okweje I; Open Space, Alla-Okweje II; Open Space, Ofukpoju |
| Idah | Ede | Rcm Sch. Area, Lgea Pilot Sch. Ede; Open Space, Ede Alabi I; Open Space, Ede Alabi II; Open Space, Ede Adejoh I; Open Space, Opposite Cemetery; Open Space, Okpotokwu; Open Space, Ede Adejoh II |
| Idah | Ega | Kabawa Ferry Side; Open Space, Vet. Clinic, Yorubawa Area; Open Space, Coop. Premises; Open Space, Egah; Open Space, Angwa Hausawa I; Open Space, Angwa Hausawa II; Open Space, Garage Premises; Open Space, Ubiga Ohiomogbo I; Open Space, Ubiga Ohiomogbo II; Open Space, Town Park; Open Space, Child Welfare Clinic |
| Idah | Ugwoda | Open Space, Adumu; Lgea School, Ugbetulu; Open Space, Ichala Achanyiwo; Open Space, Alokoina; Open Space Ichekene; Open Space, Ajaina; Open Space, Akpatega; Open Space, Agbajo; Open Space, Ikakwuewe; Lgea Prim. School, Ugwoda; Open Space, Ajegwu; Open Space, Echabi; Near Garri Industry, Ajaina Ojokuta; Open Space, Alala |
| Idah | Ichala | Open Space, Mamerebo/Oyamu; Open Space, Alla-Edeke; Open Space, Makoja; Open Space, Atanegoma; Open Space, Ojigagala/Onakpa; Open Space, Ukpakele; Open Space, Ijobe; Lgea Prim. School, Ichala Edeke; Open Space, Och Ijenu/Ekwokata; Open Space, Oba |
| Igalamela/Odolu | Avrugo | Umochina I, Lgea Sch. Umochina; Umochina II, Open Space, Umochina; Nokwa Lgea Sch. Nokwa; Owereze/Ekutuoba, Lgea Sch. Owereze; Onugidi Open Space, Onugidi; Ozara/Ihogbune/Amohuru, Open Space, Ozara; Umuchina III Lgea School Umuchina |
| Igalamela/Odolu | Ekwuloko | Ekwuloko/Edonoba/Opotoku, Open Space Ekwuloko; Lgea School, Obinagwu; Agbatebe/Ugwogwo, Open Space, Agbatebe; Lgea Sch. Ameke; Open Space, Ukpabioko; Open Space, Otikpatikpa; Open Space, Abutu-Ogbe; Open Space, Okpanabili |
| Igalamela/Odolu | Odolu | Open Space, Ukponoji; Open Space, Egabada; Open Space, Ajitata; Open Space, Olajuna; Open Space, Market Square, Odolu; Open Space, Barracks Angwa; Open Space, Olajioba; Open Space, Alakwa; Open Space, Ojegbe/Ogbolimi |
| Igalamela/Odolu | Oji-Aji | Unene/Alla Ogugu/Ugwaka/Okotobo, Open Space, Unene; Akolo/Ajafu, Open Space, Akolo; Ofoda, Open Space; Ollah, Open Space; Ugwogwo, Open Space |
| Igalamela/Odolu | Akpanya | Open Space, Agbedo I; Open Space, Agbedo II; Lgea Sch. Ajobi; Open Space, Odumogu; Lgea School, Ijagodo; Open Space, Agbokete; Ojiakpanya/Ubiaji, Open Space, Ojiakpanya; Opanda Enugu/Ogboyaga, Lgea Sch. Opanda Enugu; Oyo/Ojuwo/ Lgea Sch. Oyo; Ogboligbo/Anegbo, Open Space, Ogboligbo; Open Space, Ajekete/Agaira |
| Igalamela/Odolu | Ubele | Open Space, Igolijo; Amaka/Ejugwu, Open Space Amaka; Open Space, Ugbugbu; Open Space, Igebije; Open Space, Ochibitako; Edimego/Ipabacha, Lgea Sch. Edimego |
| Igalamela/Odolu | Ajaka I | Ojuwo-Afu/Iyogbo, Opp. High Court, Ojuwo-Afu; Fed. Poly/Okenya I & II, Lgea Sch. Okenya; Open Space, Orunu; Open Space, Egbolo; Okpachala/Ukpolo, Lgea Sch. Okpachala; Obakolo/ Lgea Sch. Obakolo; Ofuloko/Etemahi, Open Space, Ofuloko; Open Space, Okpakpata; Lgea Sch. Ajaka; Open Space, Oguma; Old Court, Ajaka; Otobo Amanyi, Ajaja - Open Space Otobo; Ibochi I & II, Open Space, Ibochi; Open Space, Aya; Open Space Ojofa; Fed. Poly/ Okenya I & II Lgea School Okenya |
| Igalamela/Odolu | Ajaka II | Acss/Ugbatugba, Open Space, Ugbatugba I; Aiyekpele I & II Open Space, Aiyekpele; Ikare I & II Open Space, Ikare; Open Space, Okochogbe; Ogbogba/Ofudu, Open Space, Ogbogba; Open Space, Imakoja; Open Space, Alaba; Open Space, Ofanwa; Open Space, Ojokuta; Acss/Ugbatugba, Open Space, Ugbatugba II |
| Igalamela/Odolu | Oforachi I | Apata/New Iyegwu, Open Space Apata; Agbanaka/Olofu/Ojokuta, Open Space, Agbanaka; Utoru/Ogbogbo/ Uwowo Open Space, Ogbogbo I; Okeku/Open Space, Okeku; Open Space, Emachi-Oko; Open Space, Olichekpe; Open Space, Okotikpa; Oforachi I Open Space; Utoru/ Ogboubo/ Uwowo Open Space Ogboubo II |
| Igalamela/Odolu | Oforachi II | Ikefi/Uragada/Ofobu, Open Space, Ikefi; Open Space, Ihiame; Uwodu/Ojomaji, Open Space, Uwodu; Open Space, Ajodanwu; Open Space, Ugbedomagu; Ofodo/Okaku/Okainwili, Open Space, Okainwili; Abolinyanyana/Ofejiji (Ajale) Open Space, Ofejiji; Lgea School, Oforachi II; Open Space, Okula-Ameji |
| Ijumu | Aiyegunle | Open Space By Nilo Quarters Aiyegunle; Open Space By Ogeh Quarters Aiyegunle; Open Space By Agoh Quarters Aiyegunle; Open Space By Okeleti Quarters Aiyegunle; Open Space By Eguru Quarters Aiyegunle; Open Space By Ofede Quarters Aiyegunle; Open Space By Iluhafon Gbede |
| Ijumu | Aiyetoro I | Open Space Iluhagba Gbede; Open Space By Okebukun Quarters Aiyetoro; Open Space By Aiyewa Quarters Beside Comm. Bank; Open Space, Iluafon Quarters Aiyetoro; Open Space I, Odda Quarters; Open Space II Odda Quarters Aiyetoro; Open Space Aduratedo Quarters |
| Ijumu | Aiyetoro II | Open Space By Town Hall Aiyetoro; Open Space By Odokoro Quarters Aiyetoro; Open Space / Agirigbon Aiyetoro; Open Space By Koko Quarters Aiyetoro; Open Space / Agirigbon Gbede; Open Space By Model Primary School Aiyetoro |
| Ijumu | Iyah/Ayeh | Open Space / Ayeh; Open Space By Idi Owo Quarters Ayeh; Open Space / Iyah; Open Space Near Baptist Sch. Iyah; Open Space By Ilgea Sch. Iyah; Open Space Near Ilgea Sch. Iyah |
| Ijumu | Odokoro | Open Space / Araromi; Open Space By Market Site Odokoro; Open Space By Ilgea Sch. Okoro; Open Space / Okoro |
| Ijumu | Aiyere/Arimah | Open Space / Arimah; Open Space / Ayere; Open Space By United Sch. No. 2 Ayere; Open Space By J. N. I. Sch. Ayere |
| Ijumu | Ogidi | Open Space, Okoro Ogidi; Open Space, Okoro Igah Ogidi |
| Ijumu | Ileteju/Origa | Open Space By Central Origa; Open Space, Ileteju |
| Ijumu | Ogale/Aduge | Open Space By Ilgea Sch. Idioro Ogale; Open Space By Postal Agency Akodi; Open Space By Ilgea Sch. Aduge |
| Ijumu | Egbeda Egga/Okedayo | Open Space By Market Site Onah Quarters; Open Space, Igbede; Open Space, Otun Quarters; Open Space By Okedayo Quarters |
| Ijumu | Iyara | Open Space By St. Paul Lgea Iyara; Open Space, Opposite Iyara Market; Open Space By Old Market Ilupa; Open Space By Town Hall Ilupa; Open Space By R. C. M. Pri. Sch. Iyara; Open Space Beside Ilelabo Restaurant; Open Space By Market Site Otun; Open Space By Model Pri. Sch. Iyara; Open Space Near Old Market Ilupa |
| Ijumu | Iffe/Ikoyi/Okejumu | Open Space By Town Hall; Open Space By Ilgea School; Open Space Ikoyi; Open Space, Ikoyi Market; Open Space Okejumu; Open Space Iffe Tedo |
| Ijumu | Iyamoye | Open Space By Orosun's Med. Store Ihalu; Open Space Near Baptist Sch. Oke-Aro; Open Space Beside Musihatu Restaurant Ihalu; Open Space By Ilgea Sch. Oke-Aro; Open Space By Ilgea Sch. Igbopin; Open Space By St. Paul's Sch. Iyamoye; Open Space By Oke Aluju Settlement Iyamoye |
| Ijumu | Ekinrin Ade | Open Space By Ife Oluwa's Med. Store; Open Space Olorogun's Area; Open Space By Ajegunle Quarters; Open Space Enimola's Area; Open Space By Oke Aofin Quarters; Open Space By Ilgea School; Open Space, Oluade's Area; Open Space By St. Patient Store; Open Space Odo-Akodi; Open Space, Toba's Area |
| Ijumu | Ibgolayere/Ilaere | Open Space By Market Site Ilowe; Open Space By Odomogun's Market Site |
| Kabba/Bunu | Asuta | St. Paul's Sch. St. I Paul's Sch. Kabba; Oludun Furniture Near Oludun Furniture I; Beside C. A. C. Odi-Olowo, Kabba; F. G. G. C., F. G. G. C. Kabba; Area Court Near Area Court (G. R. A.); St. Paul's Sch. II St. Paul's Sch. Kabba; Oludun Furniture Near Oludun Furniture II |
| Kabba/Bunu | Odo-Akete | Beside Olorunjo's Mechanic Shop; Beside Agbede Workshop Near Agbede Workshop, Kabba; Open Space, Odo-Akete |
| Kabba/Bunu | Okekoko | Maternity Centre, Owode Kabba; Town Hall, Kabba; Beside Post Office, Kabba; Open Space, Near Old Welfare Office; Lgea Sch. Oke-Adeye; College Of Agric. A. B. U. Kabba; Open Space Before Post Office; G. R. A. Near Guest House (G. R. A); Demonstration Sch. Kabba |
| Kabba/Bunu | Aiyewa | St. Mary Prim Sch. St. Mary Prim Sch. Kabba; St. Augustine College St. Augustine, Collage Kabba; Central Market Central Market, Kabba; St. Joseph Prim. Sch. St. Joseph Prim. Sch. Kabba; Near S. O. T. Katu Kabba |
| Kabba/Bunu | Aiyeteju | Akefe's Lane Aiyeteju, Kabba; Open Field, Beside Major Road Aiyeteju Kabba; Beside Wumi's Spot Kajola; St. Andrew No. II Sc. Kajola, Kabba |
| Kabba/Bunu | Otu | Aiyede-Otu, Aiyede- Otu; Otu-Egunbe, Otu-Egunbe; Ogbagba, Ogbagba; Ayangan, Ayangan; Iyah, Iyah; Open Space, Bolorunduro, Otu |
| Kabba/Bunu | Egbeda | Lgea School, Aiyedun; Open Space, Idde; Lgea School, Egbeda; Open Space, Obiri; Lgea School, Gbeleko; Iduge-Odogi, Iduge-Odogi |
| Kabba/Bunu | Okedayo | Ohakiti, Ohakiti; Apanga, Apanga; Lgea School, Kakun; St. Peter's School, Okedayo; Obele, Obele; Okebola Qtrs I; Okebola Qtrs II |
| Kabba/Bunu | Akutupa-Kiri | Open Space, Suku; Open Space, Ofere; Open Space, Osomule; Odinda Qters, Odinda; Alepa Qtrs, Alepa; Giro-Ilehi, Giro-Ilehi; Itedo Qtrs Itedo |
| Kabba/Bunu | Aiyetoro-Kiri | Taki-Ekanka, Ekanka-Taki; Ihale - Ihale; Open Space Beside Olusado Isado; Araromi Qtrs, Araromi Qtrs, Araromi; Gondon Qtrs, Gondon Qtrs; Oke-Igbala Qtrs, Ike, Oke-Igbala Qtrs, Ike; Aba-Ahmadu, Aba-Ahmadu; Jenra Qtrs, Ike, Jenra Qtrs, Ike; Iholo Street, Aiyetoro-Kiri, Aiyetoro-Kiri |
| Kabba/Bunu | Iluke | L. G. E. A. School, L. G. E. A. School Illah; Open Space, Adosi I, Compound Iluke; Idoyi Lgea School Idoyi; Ohura-Odogbo, Ohura-Odogbo; Ilogun Lgea Sch. Ilogun; L. G. E. A, Sch. Igbo, Lgea Sch. Igbo; Lgea School, Lgea Sch. Illah; Open Space, Adosi II |
| Kabba/Bunu | Olle/Oke-Ofin | Town Hall, Front Of Town Hall Oke-Ofin; Edumo, Under Mango Tree, Edumo; Aiyede-Opa Lgea Sch, Aiyede-Opa; Olle Lgea Sch., Lgea Sch. Olle.; Postal Agency, Front Of Postal Agency, Olle; Market Square Aiyede - Opa, Market Square Aiyede-Opa |
| Kabba/Bunu | Odo-Ape | Postal Agency, Odo - Ape; Market Square, Odo-Ape; Adura-Tedo Lgea Sch Adura-Tedo; Igori Lgea Sch Igori; Ighun Lgea Sch Ighun; Eshi Lgea Sch Eshi; Agbadu Lgea Sch Agbadu |
| Kabba/Bunu | Okebukun | L. G. E. A. Sch., Okebukun; Market Square, Okebukun; Aiyegunle-Igun Lgea Sch, Aiyegunle, Igun; Lgea Sch Aherin- Aherin; Open Space Agbede-Apaa Agbede-Apaa |
| Kogi . K. K. | Ukwo-Koton Karfe | Lgea Central Sch. Compound, Kotonkarfe; Under Tree Infront Of Ohimege, Kotonkarfe; Near Ukwo-Okoriko Comp. Kotonkarfe; Lgea Central School Comp. Kotonkarfe; Under Tree Infront Of Area Court, Kotonkarfe |
| Kogi . K. K. | Odaki-Koton Karfe | Infront Of Barbing Saloon Odariko, Kotonkarfe; Old Market, Beside People's Bank, Kotonkarfe; Ohogabi Near Public Tap, Kotonkarfe; Beside National Programme On Immunization Office, Kotonkarfe |
| Kogi . K. K. | Kotonkarfe South East | Lgea Sch. Compound Edeha; Lgea Sch. Comp., Akpakwu; Lgea Sch. Comp. Kasimiya; Market Square, Ozi; Lgea Sch. Comp., Akpogu; Lgea Sch. Comp., Okpareke; Lgea Sch. Comp., Osuku; Open Space, Onzo; Opareke Market Square |
| Kogi . K. K. | Girinya | Lgea Sch. Comp., Girinya; Market Square, Chaka Ruku/Tuturu; Lgea Sch. Comp., Robomi; Market Square, Panda; Lgea Sch. Comp. Ozahi; Lgea Sch. Comp., Iraki; Girinya Market Square |
| Kogi . K. K. | Irenodu | Market Square, Edekakpo; Lgea Sch. Comp., Irenodu; Lgea Sch. Comp., Ogbangede; Lgea Sch. Comp., Edegaki; Market Square, Odah; Centre Of The Village, Onumaya; Lgea Sch. Comp., Ikumo; Lgea School Comp., Odama |
| Kogi . K. K. | Akpasu | Lgea Sch. Comp., Adangere; Under A Tree In Akpasu/Ette Village; Open Space, Okofi; Lgea Sch. Comp., Gitata; Lgea Sch. Comp., Mozuette; Open Space, Kekere; Lgea Sch. Comp., Ugwo; Lgea Sch. Comp., Katubo; Open Space, Iredumose; Lgea Sch. Compound, Agbudu |
| Kogi . K. K. | Tawari | Market Square, Adingere; Lgea Sch. Comp., Gbarada; Beside Ecwa Clinic, Tawari; Under A Tree, Tazenyi; Market Square, Kpokpolobi; Lgea Sch. Comp. Achara; Lgea Sch. Comp., Deneku; Market Square, Tawari |
| Kogi . K. K. | Gegu-Beki North | Under A Tree, Gegu Egba Village; Lgea Sch. Comp., Adabo; Lgea School Compound, Ahoko |
| Kogi . K. K. | Gegu-Beki South | Near Borehole, Gegu-Beki Town; Open Space, Agidi-Ebira; Lgea Sch. Comp., Igbogo; Lgea Sch. Comp., Orehi; Open Space, Gegu-Beki; Igbogo Junction, Gegu-Beki |
| Kogi . K. K. | Chikara North | Lgea School Comp., Chikara; Lgea School Comp., Osodomi; Near Power House, Nyaba |
| Kogi . K. K. | Chikara South | Lgea School Comp, Tanahu; Open Space, Idu; Under Mango Tree, Aseni Town; Lgea Sch. Comp., Omoko |
| Lokoja | Lokoja - A | Mami Market, Near Bus Stop; Open Space Opposite Mami Market; Phase II/Workers Village, Near State Secretariat; Lokongoma Village Front Of Comm. Sec. Sch.; Adankolo, Open Space Health Clinic; Adankolo, Lgea Rpim. School I; Adankolo New Layout, Open Space Near Fehintolu; Ajagbe Mech/Moremi Rest. Open Space, Near Mechanic; Ajara/Jakura, Open Space Jakura; Lgea Sec./Nepa, Open Space, Lga Secretariat; St. Mary Lgea Sec. St, Mary Prim. Sch.; Crowther Memo/Sabon Gari; Marine Quarters, Open Space, Near Old Mobil Dept.; Lga Secret./Nepa Open Space, Lga Secret.; Part Of New Layout Near Amole's Open Space; Gra/Lkj Club, Open Space, Lokoja Club; Speb, Open Space; Cinema Hall/Angwa Munchi, Open Space, Cinema Hall; Ansarul Prim. School, Ansarul Rpim. Sch.; Holy Trinity Prim. Sch., Holy Trinity Prim. Sch.; Achai/Dogo Street Adankolo, Open Space; Mami Market, Open Space Inside Mami Mkt.; Lokongoma/Phase I, Lgea Sch. Lokongoma |
| Lokoja | Lokoja - B | Karaworo South Near Paparanda Square; Karaworo South Open Space, Near Nrc Secr.; Shaba Yagi Area Open Space; Kwatankoto South/Angwa Masara Old Mkt. Open Space, Angwa Masara; Cantonment Quarters Open Space Near Union Bank; C. S. S. Bookshop Area Open Space, Near C. S. S.; Cantonment Quarters Open Space Near G. B. O. |
| Lokoja | Lokoja - C | Makera/Kukundufi/Yashi, Open Space, Near Yashi; Bishop Crowther Prim. School, Bishop Crowther Prim Lgea; Karaworo North Open Space, Near Maiyaki's; Angwa Hamza Area, Open Space; Atta's Area, Open Space |
| Lokoja | Lokoja - D | Angwa Rimi Area, Open Space, Angwa Rimi; Yaragi Area, Open Space; Madabo Area Open Space; Inuwa Lenge Area Open Space; Angwa Power, Open Space; Angwa Kura/Mahadi Open Space |
| Lokoja | Lokoja - E | Kwata Koto North Area, Open Space; Kabawa Area, Open Space; Kabawa Area Open Space, Lga Sch. Kabawa; Kporoka Area Open Space, Kporoka; Galilee Area Open Space, Galilee; Sarikin Noma Area Open Space, Sarikin Noma; Teacher's Coll. Area Open Space, Near Poly. Gate; Sarikin Noma Area Open Space (Garage) Opp. B. Div. |
| Lokoja | Kupa North East | Agini/ Buzhi Lgea Sch.; Lagan Area Lagan Lgea Sch.; Mami Area Mami Lgea Sch.; Ebbe/Mizza Area Open Space; Ebwa Area Open Space, Ebwa; Kapu Area Kapu Lgea Sch.; Girri Area, Girri Lgea Sch.; Danbo/Isanawa/Kpatako Open Space Danbo; Mabo/Najogun Open Space, Najogun |
| Lokoja | Kupa South West | Abugi Area Abugi Lgea Sch.; Kayinko Area Kayinko Lgea Sch.; Fikara Area Fikara Lgea Sch.; Migegi Area Migegi Lgea Sch.; Awumi Area Open Space, Awumi; Kpoku/Karagi Area Open Space, Kpoku; Gbedu/Dankuzhi, Gbedu Lgea Sch.; Balagan Area Balagan Lgea Sch; Elagan Area Elagan Lgea Sch.; Karagi Area Open Space Karagi |
| Lokoja | Oworo | Agbaja Area, Agbaja Lgea Sch.; Adogbe Area, Adogbe Lgea Sch.; Ibaru Area, Open Space, Ibaru; Felele Area, Felele Lgea Sch.; Jakura Area, Jakura Lgea Sch.; Tajimi/Emu/Ogbagbon Area, Open Space, Tajimi; Jamata Area, Open Space, Jamata; Ohono/Ijiho Area, Ijiho Lgea Sch; Owara Area, Owara Lgea Sch; Igbonla Area, Igbonla Open Space; Oyo Area, Open Space, Oyo; Banda/Kungbani Area, Banda Lgea Sch; Otube Area, Otube Lgea Sch.; Akpata Area, Akpata Lgea Sch.; Oshokoshoko Area, Oshokoshoko Lgea Sch; Akoji Area Open Space Akoji; Agbodo Area, Open Space Agbodo |
| Lokoja | Kakanda | Atungbele Area, Open Space, Atungbele; Yagba Area, Open Space, Yagba; Keregbe Area, Open Space, Keregbe; Yabba Area, Open Space, Yabba; Shevun Area, Open Space Shevun; Gori /Arah Area, Open Space, Gori; Taraba Area, Open Space, Taraba; Ashe Area, Open Space, Ashe; Taji Area, Open Space, Taji; Budon-Tsofo Area, Open Space, Budon-Tsofo; Doji Area, Open Space, Doji; Edo Area, Open Space, Edo; Buge/Nambata, Open Space, Buge |
| Lokoja | Eggan | Eggan Tifain Area, Lgea Sch. Eggan; Eggan/Jukdan Area, Open Space, Eggan; Emikpangi Area, Open Space, Emikpangi; Eggan/Kusokapa Area, Open Space, Kusokapa; Kinami Tifain, Open Space, Kinami Tifain; Kinami Tako, Open Space, Kinami Tako |
| Mopa Moro | Odole - 1 | Odole Mopa Okediyeye Sign Board; Odole Mopa Yeke Signboard; Odole Mopa Shade By Okedagun Signboard; Odole Mopa Oja-Oba Frontage |
| Mopa Moro | Odole - 2 | Open Space, Bareke; Adogbe Shade By Fish Store; Adogbe-Surulere; Ileteju Gra Under Dogoraro Tree - Bareke |
| Mopa Moro | Ileteju - 1 | Ileteju By Chief Magistrates Court; Ileteju Open Space Opp. Lgea Baptist School I; Ileteju Open Space Opp. Lgea Baptist School II; Ileteju Gra; Ileteju Pandaya Market; Ilaro-Ileteju Furniture Frontage; Ileteju Old Market Road Idi-Ogbagba |
| Mopa Moro | Illeteju - 2 | Okebukun Open Space By Public Well; Okebukun; Enugbo Ecwa Lgea School; Sabo Open Space; Ijagbe Lgea Sch. Ijagbe |
| Mopa Moro | Okeagi/Ilai | Ilai Village Lgea Sch.; Ilai Village Open Space I; Aiyegunle-Okeagi Lgea Sch.; Okeagi Lgea Sch. Okeagi; Okeagi, Open Space; Open Space, Ilai Village II |
| Mopa Moro | Orokere | Orokere Bus Stop Area; Orokere Police Station Frontage; Alefere; Orokere Lgea Sch. I. Effo; Orokere Lgea School II Effo; Orokere, Open Space Along Takete Road; Orokere Old Site; Open Space, By Aiyede Settlers Effo |
| Mopa Moro | Takete Idde/Otafun | Okegada Amuro Market Okegada; Takete-Ide Lgea School Takete; Near Takete-Ide Court Premises; Takete-Ide Open Space; Otafun Village Open Space |
| Mopa Moro | Aiyedayo/Aiyedaro | Aiyedayo Village Market Square; Aiyedayo Village Lgea School; Aiyedero Market Square; Iloke Lgea School Iloke |
| Mopa Moro | Agbafogun | Aiyeteju Lgea/Ecwa School; Aiyeteju Old Market Area; Aiyeteju Under Whistling Pan; Aiyeteju A. C. S. S. Amuro; Open Space, Aiyeteju |
| Mopa Moro | Aiyede/Okagi | Okegada Aiyede Market Okegada; Okegada Lgea School, Okegada; Aiyede Lgea School, Aiyede; Aiyede Kajola Market Aiyede |
| Ofu | Igo | Igo Play-Ground/Igo Centre-Otukpo Ogene; Qic Sch. Onicha-Igo/Ojuwoigo/Ofemangigo; Open Space Igo/Onicha-Igo I & 2 I; Open Space Igo/Onicha-Igo 1 & 2 II; Lgea Sch. Odo-Efulai/Odo-Efulai-Ochi-Ojofa; Lgea Sch. Ajobi/Ofache-Enabo-Ajodi; Inekpe Near Ogohi's Palace/Ekohia-Inekpe; Lgea Sch. Ogbagebe/Ogbagebe 1 & 2 Adupi 1 & 2; Ochi-Adegbe Prim Sch/Ochi-Adegbe; Lgea Sch, Ogene-Zaria/Ogene Zaria; Open Space, Anyigba-Oko/Anyigba-Oko-Egboje; Open Space Before Market Squ./Igwu |
| Ofu | Aloma | Lgea Sch., Okula/Okula I - Iboko-Okula; Open Space /Okula 2 & 3 - Oko Okula; Open Space, Alloma/Alloma 1 & 2 Egagbe-Nebe; Gss Alloma/Alobi-Gss Alloma; Open Space /Alloma 3 & 4; Lgea School, Amuna/Agbaduma-Ochikala; Near The Field/Emakulacha; Lgea Sch. Ogbulu/Ogbulu 1 & 2; Lgea Sch., Ofante Omojo/Ofanteomojo, Odo-Efulai, Emoyonku; Near The Field Eke-Ijabe/Eke-Ijabe-Oko-Uloko; Village Square, Epugo Centre/Epugo |
| Ofu | Ejule Allah | Open Space Before, Adalo/Alla Aduku Ejima 1 & 2; Public Square, Alla Ogane/Alla Agbo-Alla Ogane-Alla Ejima; St. Martins Sch., Ejule/St. Martin's Sch. Ejule; St. Martins Sch.,/St. Martin's Sch. Ejule; Near Co-Operative, Ejule/Old Area Court 1, 2 3; Water Works, Ejulle/Water Works, Ejule; Lgea/Qic Sch., Ikona Ofakaga/Ikona Ofakaga; Open Space At Amuna Ofakaga; Lgea Sch, Ofuloko/Ofuloko-Atuwa -Alome/Ejule / Ajodo Open Space; Open Space At Egubi; Lgea Sch. Ofuloko/Ofuloko-Atuwa; Open Space Ojapata Ajataga-Udagbe; Open Space At Alla Aloji; Near /Efiyo Ejule |
| Ofu | Itobe/Okokenyi | Lgea Sch. Itobe/Lgea Sch. Labrafu 1 & 2; Open Space Hausa/Bassange Qrts/Haussa/Bassange Qurts/Grinding Mill; Ukpo/Ochapia/Ukpo-Ochapia; Ite Open Space/Odo-Ekito/Ite/Alabi; Olukudu Open Space/Ala-Oyibo-Agula-Olukudu; Lgea Sch., Olukudu/Agbenema-Okokenyi 1 & 2; Open Space Atanegoma/Otebu-Atanegoma; Open Space Ogboyaga/Ogboyaga-Arokpa-Ofoyi; Open Space Near Okpaga; Lgea Sch. Ajoh/Ajoh 1 & 2 - Ajoh 1 & 2 |
| Ofu | Ugwolawo - I | Rcm Sch., Ugwolawo/Rcm 1 & 2 - Udaba Ofu; Near Qic Sch. Play Ground Ugwolawo/Qic Sch. Hospital Site; Near The Field Ugwolawo/The Atoda II; Near Town Hall, Ugwolawo/Town Hall, Post Office Area; Lgea School, Ad/Kahane-Efekpe; Open Space /Agwale-Ogokoh-Ofenya; Open Space /Ayeye-Ahi-Ojapata; Lgea Sch. Udeh/Udeh; Lgea Sch, Ahi-Alijobu/Ahi-Okekpe-Obiaga-Alijobu; Lgea Sch. Ogegume/Ogegume 1 & 2/Okpaji-Ujokiti, Ojofa; Open Space /Ojuwo-Omachi 1 & 2; Near The Field, Ukpotume/Ukpotume; Lgea Sch., Atoda/Atoda I |
| Ofu | Ugwolawo - 2 | Near Grinding Mill Ajochai/Ukpolo Ocheja,-Ate-Ajo, Ojochai; Lgea Sch. Ojedebe/Ojuwo 1 & 2 Ojejebe, Anike; Before Health Clinic, Ojuwo-Ocha/Ojuwo-Ocha, Ojuwo Onaji, Achago; Near Health Clinic, Ojuwo-Ocha/Ojuwo-Ocha, Ojuwo Onaji, Achago; Lgea Sch, Igojo/Igojo; Open Space At Ikpalaka/Abiyote, Ikpalaka; Open Space At/Agbogodo; Open Space At Ojigba |
| Ofu | Aloji | Open Space Ogbabo/Ogbabo 1, 2 & 3 Ogbabo Olofu; Aloji Old Market Square/Aloji 1 and 2, Ojuwo-Aloji; Open Space At Ajatokunu/Aloji Ajatokunu, Ojuwo Aloji; Open Space, Ojodu Eti-Aja/Ojodu 1 & 2 Ajakechi; Igebije Market Square/Igebiji 1 & 2; Lgea Sch. Obagwu 1, 2, 3 & 4; Lgea Sch. Ojo-Agefu/Ogba-Obala, Ojo-Agefu; Lgea Sch. Ikagbo/Ikagbo 1 & 2, Akpodo; Lgea Sch. Ijogo/Ijogo, Kalaba, Ikpera |
| Ofu | Ochadamu | Health Clinic Akpagidigbo/Akpagidigbo 1,2,3 & 4; Lgea Sch. Ofokopi/Ofokopi 1 & 2; Lgea Sch. Ochadamu/Ochadamu I, Emewe Ofejiji; G. S. S. Ochadamu/Olofu Ochadamu, Mamerebo; Open Space At Amuna Okele, Okele; Open Space At Owala, Agidigbanyi; Rcm Sch. Obaje Ako/Obaje Ako, Ukanukpoda; Lgea Sch. Owowolo/Owowolo 1, 2 & 3; Open Space At Iyokpe-Owowolo; Open Space At Okabo 1,2 & 3; Front Of Hajiya Hotel, Umomi/Umomi IV; Open Space At Ofakaga, Ofakaga, Ojijini; Open Space At Ogbakpedo; Market Square Ikpokejo/Ikpokejo 1 & 2; Open Space At Alome Umomi; Open Space Market Square/ Umomi I; Comm. Sec. Sch. Ofolikpa/Ofolikpa; Lgea Sch. Umomi/Umomi Efekpe 2 |
| Ofu | Ogbonicha | Open Space At Ojone/Ojone, Emakps, Ofante; Lgea Sch. Ogbonicha/Ofache, Ochi-Ogbonicha, Omodo Fa Ogbonicha; Lgea Sch. Ogbonicha/Ofache, Ochi-Ogbonicha, Omododa; Lgea Sch. Ofabo/Ofabo 1 & 2; Open Space At Egume, Abejukolo; Near The Field Ofabo/Ofabo III, Okagwu; Open Space At Ogalaji/Ogalaji, Otulukpa; Open Space At Ofada/Ofada, Etukwo, Ogene; Open Space At Emodu; Open Space At Okakwu |
| Ofu | Iboko/Efakwu | Open Space Iboko Centre/Iboko, Ogbonoko; Ojuwo Village Square/Ojuwo, Iboko; Igoti Junction/Agojejuate 1 & 2, Ogene; Lgea Sch, Ajodi/Agojeju Ikona, Ojapata, Ajodi; Lgea Sch. Ugbamaka/Efakwu/Ugbamaka 1 & 2; Town Hall Field/Alodo, Anike; Igoti Centre/Igoti, Efilo; Lgea Sch. Atiya/Atiya, Ogo; Lgea Sch. Ohielewu/Ohielewu; Lgea Sch. Agojeju/Ate Akpoto |
| Ogori Mangogo | Eni | Open Space- Eni Ogori I; Open Space - Eni Ogori II; Open Space - Eni Ogori III; Open Space - Eni, Ogori IV; Ogori Dispensary, Ogori; C. C. H. Sch., Ogori; Open Space - Eni Ogori V; Open Space Near Mama Kano; Open Space VI Eni, Ogori; Civic Centre, Ogori; Open Space - Eni Ogori VII |
| Ogori Mangogo | Oshobane | Open Space Ogori Garage, Ogori; Open Space I, Ogori; Open Space II, Ogori; Open Space III, Ogori; Near Tee Spot, Ogori; Open Space IV; Open Space / Ogori V; Open Space VI, Ogori |
| Ogori Mangogo | Okibo | At The Maternity Centre, Ogori; Open Space-Okibo, I - Ogori; Open Space Okibo II, Ogori; Open Space Okibo - Ogori III; Open Space IV, Okibo-Ogori |
| Ogori Mangogo | Okesi | Open Space Okesi, Ogori; Open Space Okesi, Ogori II; Open Space III, Ogori; St. Peter's Primary School, Ogori; St. Perer's Primary School II, Ogori |
| Ogori Mangogo | Ileteju | Open Space I Ileteju; Open Space II Ileteju Ogori; Open Space III, Ileteju; Open Space Ileteju IV, Ogori |
| Ogori Mangogo | Aiyeromi | Open Space I, Aiyeromi - Ogori; Open Space, Near General Ogori; Open Space, Ogori II; Open Space /Aiyeromi III; Open Space Aiyeromi Ogori IV |
| Ogori Mangogo | Ugugu | Near Olumodeji's (Nig. Ent.) Printer-Magongo; Open Space Near Maternity Office - Magongo; Open Space - Magongo I; Open Space - Magongo II; Open Space - Magongo III; Open Space - Okonobolo Farm Centre Magongo IV; Open Space - Mangogo V; Open Space - Magongo VI; Open Space - Maternity Centre |
| Ogori Mangogo | Obinoyin | Open Space - Obinoyin-Magongo I; Open Space - Obinoyin-Magongo II; Open Space - Obinoyin-Magongo III; L. G. E. A / R. C. M School- Obinoyin-Magongo I; Open Space - Obinoyin-Magongo IV; Open Space - Obinoyin-Magongo V; Open Space - Obinoyin-Magongo VI; L. G. E. A / R. C. M. S School - Obinoyin-Magongo II; Open Space - Obinoyin-Magongo VII |
| Ogori Mangogo | Obatgben | Open Space - Obatigben - Magongo I; Open Space - Obatigben - Magongo II; Open Space - Obatigben - Magongo III; Open Space - Obatigben - Magongo IV; Open Space - Obatigben - Magongo V; Open Space - Obatigben - Magongo VI |
| Ogori Mangogo | Oturu Opowuroye | Open Space - Oturu Opowuroye Magongo I; Open Space - Oturu Opowuroye Magongo II; Open Space - Oturu Opowuroye Magongo III; C. M. S. School Magongo; Open Space - Oturu Opowuroye Magongo IV |
| Okehi | Obeiba I | L. G. E. A School - Obeiba I; L. G. E. A School - Obeiba II; L. G. E. A School - Obeiba III; L. G. E. A School - Obeiba IV; L. G. E. A Aud School - Obeiba I; L. G. E. A Aud School - Obeiba II; Near Central School Obeiba; Near Community Bank I; Near Community Bank II; Near Community Bank III; Near Salawu Adoro's House I; Near Salawu Adoro's House II; Maternity Centre I; Maternity Centre II; Maternity Centre III; L. G. E. A Anglican School Iniku I; L. G. E. A Anglican School Iniku II; Near Audu Adano's House I; Near Audu Adano's House II; Near Salami Odeh's House I; Near Salami Odeh's House II |
| Okehi | Obeiba II | Open Space Near Otaru Crescent; Old Postal Agency; Open Space Near Ali Inare's House I; Open Space Near Ali Inare's House II; Open Space Near Salawu Majebi's House I; Open Space Near Salawu Majebi's House II; Open Space Near Okino's Clinic; Open Space Near Vulcanizer I; Open Space Near Vulcanizer II; Open Space Near C & S I; Open Space Near C & S II; L. G. E. A School Ukowa I; L. G. E. A School Ukowa II; Open Space Near Musa Bello's House |
| Okehi | Ikuehi | M. Baudeen School Ikuehi I; M. Baudeen School Ikuehi II; M. Baudeen School Ikuehi III; Near Mosque Ikinaro's House I; Near Mosque Ikinaro's House II; Open Space Ogedemgbe's House; Open Space Ojunde Market I; Open Space Ojunde Market II; Open Space Ojunde Market III; L. G. E. A St Peter's Ang. Ikuehi I; L. G. E. A St Peter's Ang. Ikuehi II; L. G. E. A St. Peter's Ang. Ikuehi III; L. G. E. A St. Peter's Ang. Ikuehi IV; Near Akande's House I; Near Akande's House II; Near Ibrahim Moh's House; Near Upache's House; Near Unity Hotel; Near Sumonu Ozigi's House I; Ikuehi Ichenya; Near Sumonu Ozigi's House II |
| Okehi | Ohueta | Govt. Day Sec. Sch. Ohueta I; Govt. Day Sec. Sch. Ohueta II; L. G. E. A School Ohueta I; L. G. E. A School Ohueta II; L. G. E. A School Ohueta III; L. G. E. A School Ohueta IV; Open Space Near Ovaku's House I; Open Space Near Chief Adebayo Watch Man's House; Open Space Near Aduvi's House; Open Space Near Braimoh's House; Near Otaru's Compound; Near Onoruoiza's Compound; Open Space Near Ovaku's House II |
| Okehi | Oboroke Eba | Near Salami Enero's House, Oboroke Eba; Near Jatto's House; Beside Ajanaku's House; Near Kujenu's House; Beside Audu Onoba's House; Near Alabi's House; Near L. House Udioyivo; Holy Trinity School Oboroke I; Holy Trinity School Oboroke II; Beside Otida's Compound; Near Egugu's House; Holy Trinity School Oboroke-Eba; R. C. M. School Oboroke I; R. C. M. School Oboroke II; R. C. M. School Oboroke III; L. G. E. A Baptist School Oboroke I; L. G. E. A Baptist School Oboroke II; L. G. E. A Baptist School Oboroke III; Beside Hajiya Ahmed's Compound Oboroke; L. G. E. A Baptist Sch. Oboroke IV |
| Okehi | Oboroke Uvete I | L. G. E. A School Otutu-Eba; Okehi Comm. Sec. School Oboroke; Open Space Near Sanni Ajibade's Compound; Open Space Ojeku's Compound; L. G. E. A School Oboroke-Uvete I; L. G. E. A School Oboroke-Uvete II; Open Space Near Dr. Lawal's House Comp.; Open Space Near Onijobo's Compound; Open Space Near Jimoh Ondeku Compound I; Open Space Near Jimoh Ondeku Compound II; Open Space Near Simpa'scompound; Opposite Post Office I; Opposite Post Office II; Opposite Post Office III |
| Okehi | Eika / Ohizenyi | Ikaturu Near Akuvada's Compound; L. G. E. A School Ikaturu I; L. G. E. A School Ikaturu II; L. G. E. A Eika Ohizenyi I; L. G. E. A Eika Ohizenyi II; L. G. E. A Eika Ohizenyi III; Near Isa Okodi's Compound; L. G. E. A School Iresuegeze I; L. G. E. A School Iresuegeze II; L. G. E. A School Iresuegeze III; Beside Salami Onoba's Compound; Maternity Ireokovi Eika; Oyino's Market, Eika; Eika Ohizenyi Ohori Eika; Ohizenyi Police Station; Staff School Eika Camp.; L. G. E. A School Abobo I; Open Space Enyiosiretu; Beside Anaza's Compound; Near Ogogo Compound; L. E. G. A School Abobo II |
| Okehi | Okaito / Usungwen | L. G. E. A School Okaito I; L. G. E. A School Okaito II; Near Karikati's Compound; Near Okaito Ohieku's Compound; Dispensary Okaito I; Dispensary Okaito II; Market Centre Okaito I; Market Centre Okaito II; L. G. E. A School Usungwe; Ohu By The Village Centre; Open Space Usungwe Ogido's Compound; Open Space Near Okaraga's Compound I; Open Space Near Okaraga's Compound II |
| Okehi | Ohuepe / Omavi Uboro | L. G. E. A School Ohuepe I; L. G. E. A School Ohuepe II; Near Ozigi's Compound; Beside Upache's Compound; L. G. E. A. School Omavi I; L. G. E. A. School Omavi II; Adeha Village Centre; Okehi Comm. Sec. Sch. Uboro I; Okehi Comm. Sec. Sch. Uboro II; Open Space Uboro - Uvete |
| Okehi | Obangede / Uhuodo | L. G. E. A School Obangede I; L. G. E. A School Obangede II; L. G. E. A School Obangede III; L. G. E. A School Obangede IV; L. G. E. A School Ogogoro I; L. G. E. A School Ogogoro II; Dispensary Quarters Obangede; School Of Nursing Road; L. G. E. A School Uhuodo I; L. G. E. A School Uhuodo II; L. G. E. A School Uhuodo III; L. G. E. A School Uhuodo IV; Open Space Eika - Eba; Opposite F. C. E Campus I; Opposite F. C. E Campus II; L. G. E. A School Uhuodo V |
| Okehi | Oboroke Uvete - II | Open Space Jimoh Simpa's Comp.; Open Space Near Jimoh Ondeku's Compound; Open Space Near Joshua's House I; Open Space Near Joshua's House II; Open Space Near Ali Ogedemgbe's House I; Open Space Near Ali Ogedemgbe's House II; Open Space Near Balogun's House I; Open Space Near Balogun's House II; L. G. E. A School Iruvusechi I; L. G. E. A School Iruvusechi II; L. G. E. A School Iruvusechi III; L. G. E. A School Iruvusechi IV |
| Okene | Bariki | Water Tank Area - Idiche I; Water Tank Area - Idiche II; Revenue Office Area - Okene; Post Office Area - Okene; Adjacent Public Toilet I; Adjacent Public Toilet II; Open Space At Ajana Area I; Open Space At Ajana Area II; Open Space Behind Okene Motor Park; Road Side Before Relief Clinic; Open Space Beside Danga's Area; Road Side By P & T Cable- Ozuwaya Rd.; Opposite Shefi Ohikere Beer Palour; Road Side By Public Tap-Bariki; Road Side By Bash Video - Idozumi; Road Side By Peace Cottage; Open Space By Lawal Ubeina; Open Space By Late Fache; Open Space By Oricha Onipako; Under Dogoyaro Tree I, Ahogede; Under Dogoyaro Tree II, Ahogede; Near Imam's House Iruvucheba; Roadside Idozumi's Round About; Roadside Opposite Ogori Express Bus Stop; Roadside By Taye Salami Turner Mechanic Lagos Rd. I; Roadside By Taye Salami Turner Mechanic Lagos Rd. II; Ago Motor Park I; Ago Motor Park II; Ago Motor Park III; Roadside Near Usman Oshihiwa; Open Space Opposite Idris Mamanndire; Roadside By Osike Electrical Workshop; Open Space Behind Oniya Medical Clinic - Saw Mill Area; Water Works Junction - Ozuwaya; Roadside At Momarch Furniture By River Side Restaurant; Open Space By Moh'D Okehi I; Open Space By Moh'D Okehi II; Govt. Day Sec. Sch. Irivucheba I; Govt. Day Sec. Sch. Irivucheba II; Water Tank Area, Idiche; Open Space, Behind Danga Area; Open Space By Peace Cottage, Ahogede |
| Okene | Obessa | Open Space By Ibrahim Olokoba I; Open Space By Ibrahim Olokoba II; Open Space Near R. B Ojeba; L. G. E. A / St Andrews School I; L. G. E. A / St Andrews School II; Open Space By Nasoso Restaurant; Open Space Behind Mobil Petrol Station; Road Side By Ozuwaya Road, By Islamic Institute; Roadside By Palm Tree - Oke - Oye; Roadside By Dele Furniture I; Roadside By Dele Furniture II; Roadside By Oko Brothers I; Roadside By Oko Brothers II; L. G. E. A Central I; L. G. E. A Central II; Near L. G. A Dispensary; L. G. A Child Welfare Clinic; Open Space At Police Station; G. R. A I Near Prestige Nursery School; G. R. A. II Along Barrack Road Near Nitel |
| Okene | Onyukoko | Agama Farm Settlement; Oguda - Farm Settlement; Achoze - Farm Settlement; Ohiana - Farm Settlement; Check Point By Roadside - Benin Rd.; O. S. S Along Ajaokuta Rd.; R. C. M. South I - Onyukoko I; R. C. M. South I - Onyukoko II; Demonstration II - Onyukoko I; Demonstration II - Onyukoko II; Custom Base - Benin Rd.; Near Ododo's Compound Benin Rd.; Roadside By Salami Ogaji; Roadside By Bello Omoyi Area; L. G. E. A Demonstration Sch. I; L. G. E. A Demonstration Sch. II; L. G. E. A Demonstration Sch. III; L. G. E. A Demonstration Sch. IV; L. G. E. A Primary School Iduka I; L. G. E. A Primary School Iduka II; L. G. E. A Primary School Iduka III; Queen Of Apostles College I; Queen Of Apostles College II; By Obongara Compound; By Shehu Junction; Idopokiti Area; Beside Ahovi's Compound; Near Ajanaku's Compound; Open Space By Salami Ogaji; Open Space By Bello Omoyi |
| Okene | Idoji | L. G. E. A Primary School Inike I; L. G. E. A Primary School Inike II; L. G. E. A Primary School Inike III; A. A. A. M. C. O Premises Okene I; A. A. A. M. C. O Premises Okene II; A. A. A. M. C. O Premises Okene III; Old Okene Clinic; Fancy Junction Idoji I; Fancy Junction Idoji II; Roadside By Amesco Clinic; A. A. A. M. C. O Gate II - Okene; Okene Town Hall Idoji I; Okene Town Hall Idoji II; L. G. E. A Primary School Etahi I; L. G. E. A Primary School Etahi II; L. G. E. A Primary School Etahi III; L. G. E. A Primary School Etahi IV; L. G. E. A Primary School Etahi V; L. G. E. A Primary School Etahi VI; Community Sec. Sch. Etahi I; Community Sec. Sch. Etahi II; Open Space At Alhaji Ozigi Comp. I; Open Space At Alhaji Ozigi Comp. II; Open Space Opposite - Old Clinic; Open Space At Salihu Agere I; Open Space At Salihu Agere II |
| Okene | Orietesu | Open Space By Late Ohida Area; Roadside By Ozumi Area; Open Space Near Ozumi Area; Open Space By Jimoh Ngo Area; Open Space By Badoko Area; Near Musa Onusaba Area I; Open Space Near Musa Onusaba II; Open Space By Otohinoyi Area; Public Library; Roadside By Alhaji Tijani Ahmed; Open Space Near Alhaji Tijani Ahmed; Roadside By Bus Stop By Jummat Mosque; Roadside By L. G. A Secretariat; Open Space Behind L. G. A Secretariat; Open Space At L. G. A Secretariat; Bus Stop Opposite Bank Of The North; Open Space At Area Court; Open Space At Newspaper Stand Area; Roadside Opposite Reading Room - Okene; Roadside By Governor Recording Studio; Roadside At Junction National Bank Rd; Open Space Near Jimoh Ngo Area II |
| Okene | Otutu | L. G. E. A / R. C. M North I; L. G. E. A / R. C. M North II; L. G. E. A / R. C. M North IV; L. G. E. A / R. C. M North V; Roadside By Salami Salihu Comp.; Roadside By Idogido Junction; L. G. E. A Central I; L. G. E. A Central II; L. G. E. A Central V School I; L. G. E. A Central V School II; Amore Clinic Okene; Nepa Transformer Junction I; Nepa Transformer Junction II; Ecwa Church Premises Idare; Near C. A. C Church Idare; Near Nyase Hotel |
| Okene | Okene-Eba / Agassa/ Ahache | L. G. E. A / St John's Primary School Agassa I; L. G. E. A / St John's Primary School Agassa II; Roadside By Konga Inorere - Ahache I; Roadside By Konga Inorere - Ahache II; Roadside By Stand Avereho - Ahache III; L. G. E. A Primary School - Ahache I; L. G. E. A Primary School - Ahache II; L. G. E. A Primary School - Agassa I; L. G. E. A Primary School - Agassa II; L. G. E. A Primary School - Agassa III; Open Space At Asubo Area; L. G. E. A Primary School - Ukowa I; L. G. E. A Primary School - Ukowa II; L. G. E. A Primary School - Ukowa III; Lgea Primary School - Idagidigbo I; Lgea Primary School - Idagidigbo II; Lgea Primary School - Ukowa IV; Lgea Primary School - Ukowa V; Lgea Primary School - Ukowa VI; Lgea Primary School - Idagidigbo III; Lgea Primary School - Idagidigbo IV; Lgea Primary School - Idagidigbo V; Under Old P&T Station-Oridobe I; Under Old P&T Station-Oridobe II; Road Side At Onoba Area I; Road Side At Onoba Area II; Open Space At Audu Omahe Area; Road Side At Ukako-Okene-Eba I; Road Side At Ukako-Okene-Eba II; Road Side At Junction Of Uduka; Road Side At Uduka Public Well; Road Side At Idozumi Public Tap; Road Side At Ukowa I Area |
| Okene | Obehira Uvete | Lgea Primary School - Arigo I; Lgea Primary School - Arigo II; Road Side By Nepa Transformer; Road Side At Junction Of Arigo; Road Side At Junction Of R. H. C.; Road Side At Inatah-Obehira; Road Side At Lasisi Ozi Asuku; Road Side At Junction-Ogori Magongo; Road Side By Old Garage-Obehira I; Road Side By Old Garage-Obehira II; Near Alh. Ozigizigi Compound, Okekere; Lgea Primary School - Idoma I; Lgea Primary School - Idoma II; Lgea Primary School - Idoma III; Open Space By Zubair Anapini; Open Space By Ire-Yapana; Road Side By Singer Nasko I; Road Side By Singer Nasko II; Near Alhaji Salami Ajoge Comp |
| Okene | Obehira Eba | Lgea Primary School-Ituahi I; Lgea Primary School-Ituahi II; Lgea Primary School-Ituahi III; Basic Health Clinic, Ageva; Water Tank Area - Obehira-Eba; Road Side By Kanga-Okikiri Ozumi I; Road Side By Kanga-Okikiri Ozumi II; Road Side By Ohu-Geri Area Oye I; Road Side By Ohu-Geri Area Oye II; Open Space Under Coconut Tree, Opp. Engr. Sule; Lgea School I, Obehira-Eba I; Lgea School I, Obehira-Eba II; Lgea School III Okengwe; Lgea School II, Obehira-Eba I; Lgea School II - Obehira-Eba II; Road Side By Alh. Agidi Area I; Road Side By Alh. Agidi Area II; Lgea School - Okengwe; Near Ali's Compound - Okengwe |
| Okene | Abuga/Ozuja | Lgea Sefu Deen Primary School-Okengwe I; Lgea Sefu Deen Primary School-Okengwe II; Lgea Sefu Deen Primary School-Okengwe III; Lgea Primary School Eika-Oku I; Lgea Primary School Eika-Oku II; Lgea Primary School Eika-Oku III; Road Side By Makaranta - Ihima Road I; Road Side By Makaranta - Ihima Road II; Road Side By Makaranta - Ihima Road III; Road Side By Nepa Transformer Emco Road; Road Side By Continuing Education Okengwe I; Road Side By Continuing Education Okengwe II; Near Alhaji Ajinmwon's Comp.; Agbede's Compound; Lgea/St. Paul School-Okengwe I; Lgea/St. Paul School-Okengwe II; Lgea/St. Paul School-Okengwe III; Lgea/St. Paul School-Okengwe IV; Lgea/St. Paul School-Okengwe V; Lgea/St. Paul School-Okengwe VI; Lgea Dispensary Area; Postal Agency Area; Near Area Court-Ozuja; Near Area Council Office; Better Life Office Area; Road Side By Ohuda - Ozuja; Near Ohindase's Palace; Near Moh's Compound; Road Side By Ohuda II; Near Amoh Area |
| Okene | Upogoro/Odenku | R. C. C. School - Upogoro I; R. C. C. School - Upogoro II; R. C. C. School - Upogoro III; R. C. C. School - Upogoro IV; Road Side Former Rd. Upogoro; Lgea Primary School - Odenku I; Lgea Primary School - Odenku II; Lgea Primary School - Odenku III; Open Space By Sarki Compound |
| Olamaboro | Imane I | Lgea School, Abo Ojuwo; Lgea School, Atene Goma; Village Square, Efakpa/Ojoko; Ofudu Makt. Square, Oforo/Ofudu; Lgea School, Aboojoche I & II; Village Square Efekpe, Efekpe; R. C. M. School, Ogalole I & II; Lgea School, Barracks I & II; Village Square, Ojamidoele; Village Square, Ojakpama; Village Square, Ojamochinji; Village Square, Ojamogwucheawuji; Village Square, Efachipu I; Old Mkt. Square, Ogili; Village Square, Efofe; Open Space, Ojamodochai; Near Madaki's House, Ikpechi; Lgea School, Ojamaigbachu; Lgea Mabenyi II, Mabenyi II; Lgea School, Ajitata/Achipu/Ojugbo; Open Space, Inwa/Utoje; Village Square, Efachipu II |
| Olamaboro | Imane II | Village Square, Achipu; Lgea School Etukwo, Etukwo; Village Square, Akpoloko I & II; Mkt. Square, Adumu/Ojabo; Mkt. Square Ojokwunene/Eteke; Mkt. Square, Uloko/Omelewu; Village Square, Efabo I; Village Square, Amobia Unyi; Lgea School Ogenago, Ogenago I & II; Open Space, Akpoli/Efabacha I; Lgea School Oklododo, Oklododo; Market Square, Idekpa; Open Space, Amoke/Enemona/Akpoli II; Open Space, Akpali; Open Space, Amoke Enemona |
| Olamaboro | Ogugu I | Open Space, Ukwaja; Lgea School Ikeleku, Ikeleku Emonoji; Open Space, Ofode/Adumu; Lgea School Anyigba Emachanya/Anyigba/Ijado; Open Space, Ikem/Anekpa/Okaku; Market Square, Ogbofe/Otakpa; Open Space, Emagaba; Open Space, Ogodu'Alloma; Open Space, Emachadu/Ukpale; Open Space, Odoanagbo; Open Space, Ogbodo; Open Space, Ichangbe; Open Space, Adum Etafor |
| Olamaboro | Ogugu II | Lgea School, Imaja/Adupi/Emononyi; Village Square, Emakuracha; Lgea School, Emodu I & II; R. C. M. School, Ojira Unyi Owalla; Ofante Mkt. Square, Efofe I & II/Alafor; Lgea Amaka, Amaka Ejura/Okpoga; Ejule Mkt. Square, Odogomu/Ejule; Lgea School Adupi, Obereche/Adupi; Open Space, Efofe/Emojiku; Open Space, Alafor |
| Olamaboro | Ogugu III | Open Space Odidoko, Odidoko; Open Space, Ochaja Ogo'Ochaja; Village Square, Efofe/Ogodu; Ogugu Central School, Ogugu C. S. S.; Open Space Ogugu, Okegbiate/Alaicha; Open Space Ogane/Oforachi; Open Space Emonoja/Aludu/Ankpa; Village Square, Emakpe Unyi; Village Square, Orinono, Orinono/Okpodu Ega; Open Space, Emagaba/Itefi; Emakpe Village Square, Emakpe/Iyagwu; Open Space, Okegbi Ate/Alagacha/Sgari |
| Olamaboro | Olamaboro I | Open Space, Otakuhi; Mkt Square Igoti, Igoti; Lega School Adeh, Adeh Ogo; Lgea School Ejoka, Ejoka; Lgea School Ugbamaka, Ugbamaka Adeh; Lgea School Ajukabu, Ajukabu; Lgea School Agwubeje, Agwubeje; Lgea School Iberi, Iberi; Open Space, Efodo Adeh; Village Square, Odeito/Iyaya; Ade Lgea School, Adeh-Ogo Odeito |
| Olamaboro | Olamaboro II | Open Space Adamaku, Adamaku I & II; Market Square, Ofa Centre/Odeito; Lgea School Etutekpe, Etutekpe; Lgea School Agwodaba, Agwodaba; Market Square Akpakpa, Akpakpa; Open Space Agbaduma, Agbaduma; Lgea School Ibana, Ibana; Village Square, Ejenumu; Lgea School Etutukpe, Etutukpe; Q. I. C. School, Ochaja Ogo |
| Olamaboro | Olamaboro III | Open Space Ocgs Okpo, Okpo Ocgs; Ceremonial Square, Ceremonial Square; Q. I. C. School Premises, Q. I. C. School Okpo; Open Space, Square, Alagani; Uko Centre, Uko/Onugba/Etukwo Oko; Open Space, Ofanwa/Ugbologidi/Adum; Open Space, Ojamonogu; Open Space, Alekwo/Ojamapunu; Ugbogbo Lgea School, Ugbougojo/Ojamakogu; Lgea School Utoba, Utoba/Ojamochebe; Odeito Ala Junction, Odeito/Ala; Lgea School Ogbagebe, Odobu Ogba Gebe |
| Olamaboro | Olamaboro IV | Lgea School Igah Ochebe, Igah Ochebe; Mkt. Square Igah, Igah Etukwo; Open Space Igha, Ojuwo Igha; Lgea School Agala, Agala/Ukpabi/Agala I; Lgea Eboyi, Eboyi- Igah; Near Maternity Clinic, Ikeje I & II/Ogo Igah; Market Square, Ogene Igah; Lgea School, Sabogari Ugbamaka; Oforo Ichechele, Oforo Ichechele; Open Space, Ogaji Ugbamaka/Odeito; Open Space, Odeito/Ugbamaka |
| Olamaboro | Olamaboro V | Lgea School Inabe, Inabe/Efoja; Lgea School Inele, Ugo I & II; Unobe Mkt. Square, Unobe; Lgea School Ugojouale, Ugojo Ubalu; Open Space, Ukpokido; Open Space, Ujugbudu |
| Omala | Abejukolo I | Opposite Water Board Sabongeri I; Opposite First Bank Sabongeri II; Near Okale Akoji's House, Sabongeri III; R. C. M. School, Abejukolo, Sabongeri IV; Near Acheneje/Duguma's House Olomala I; Near Adama Ojejo's House, Olomala II; Near Usman Akuta's House Olomala III; Central School Abejukolo, Olomala IV; Near Motor Park, Oleji I; Iyade Road (Under Mango Tree) Oleji II; Near Baba Anya's House, Oleji III; Near Madaki's House Egbachi/Ogwutu; Near Awodi Adejo's House Oleji IV |
| Omala | Abejukolo II | Lgea School, Igah-Onife; Lgea School, Echia, Ogo/Echa I; Near Senior Madaki's House, Echa II; Infront Of Ali Akagu's House, Echa III; Lgea School Iyade, Iyade; Near Madaki's House, Awawa-Iyade |
| Omala | Opoda/Ofejiji | Lgea School Opada, Opada/Ajedibale; Near Madaki's House, Ajichekpa; Lgea School Agbenema, Agbenema I/Ajejima; Near Senior Madaki's House, Agbenema II; Near Madaki's House, Ofejiji; Lgea School, Agabifo, Agabifo; Lgea School Ajedibodu, Ajedibodu; Lgea School Ajiyolo, Ajiyolo; Near Madaki's House, Ihiame; Lgea School Ajodoma; Lgea School Ikpoba, Ikpoba; Lgea School Ojuwo, Ojuwo; Lgea School Agbenema, Agbenema/Ajejima |
| Omala | Bagana | Opposite Cefn, Odumukpo; Lgea School Ajomaoji, Ajomakoji; Near Market Square, Obakume Ofugolo; Lgea School Obakume, Obakume I; Lgea School Bagana, Bagana I; Near Canteen, Bagana II; Near Canteen, Bagana III; Near Motor Park Bagana IV; Opposite Gago's House, Bagana V; Lgea School Amagede, Amagede; Lgea School Ogba, Ogba; Lgea School Patani, Patani; Near Onuh Iyaji's House, Obakume II |
| Omala | Okpatala | Q. I. C. School Okpotala, Okpotala I; Near Gago's House, Okpotala II; Near Madaki's House, Bassa Ofapo; Near Madaki's House, Idrisu I; Lgea School Idrisu, Idrisu II; Beside Madaki's House, Olahieba I; Lgea School Olahieba, Olahieba II; Near Madaki's House, Ajawodi; Near Madaki's House, Imajenuwe; Near Madaki's House, Ajadama; Near Madaki's House, Ojuwo |
| Omala | Akpacha | Near Madaki's House, Ajaja; Near Madaki's House, Efiwo; Lgea School Kaduna, Kaduna; Lgea School Ibado, Ibado I; Near Market Square, Ibado II; Near Sule Iyaji's House, Ibado III; Near Madaki Amodu's House, Igeri I; Opposite Premier Bar House, Igeri II; Lgea School Akpacha, Akpacha I; Opposite Cmml Church, Akpacha II; Lgea School Olechu, Olechu; Near Madaki's House, Oliya; Lgea School Igaliwo, Igaliwo |
| Omala | Bagaji | Village Square Udaba, Udaba/Ajadokpoja; Rcm School Bagaji, Bagaji I; Rcm School Bagaji, Bagaji II; Near Idoko Akpa's House, Bagaji III; Near Idoko Akpa's House, Bagaji IV; Near Adaji's House, Bagaji V; Lgea School Agojeju, Agojeju I; Lgea School Agojeju, Agojeju II; Beside Yusufu Atabo's House, Agojeju III; Beside Yusufu Atabo's House, Agojeju IV; Lgea School Odamagwu, Odamagwu; Near Haruna Oyibo's House, Ajogili; Lgea School Ajokpachi, Ajokpachi I; Lgea School Ajokpachi, Ajokpachi II |
| Omala | Icheke Ajopachi | Beside Madaki's House, Ajedibo; Lgea School Ajakawo, Ajakawo; Near Madaki's House, Icheke Ajocholi; Lgea School Icheke, Icheke Ogane; Lgea School Ajokpachi, Ajokpachi-Achogba; Near Madaki's House, Ojugo; Near Madaki's House, Okwugba; Lgea School Oti II III; Near Gago's House, Oti I.; Lgea School Ikefi, Ikefi; Near Market Square, Okakwu; Lgea School Olokwu, Olokwu; Near Madaki's House, Ajobe; Near Senior Madaki's House, Igebije |
| Omala | Ogodu | Along Elubi Road, Adumu Ogodu; Near Akawo's House, Adumu; Near Madaki's House Efakwu I; Near Madaki's House Efakwu II; Near Enere's House, Ogodu Erakwu; Near Ocheni Ekpeko's House Ojeda I; Near Omera's House, Ojeda II; Near Abu Aka's House, Ojeda III; Lgea School Ogodu, Ate Ogodu I & II; Near Development Office, Ate Ogodu III; Near Sule Silas House, Ogodu I; Beside Sule Silas House, Ogodu II |
| Omala | Olla | Near Mohammed Atachu's House, Ojegbe; Opposite Q. I. C. Alla Olla; Near Alh. Ibrahim's House, Ojiyele; Near Market Square, Ajakagwu I; Under Okro Tree; Ele Ufedo Praying Centre, Ele Ufedo Centre; Near Ameh Ofejiji's House, Egbenecha; Near Ogohi's House, Ate Olla; Near Zekeri Edibo's House, Ate Ebakpoti |
| Yagba East | Ife Olukotun I | Okere, Near Old Market Square; Ilohun, Beside Ere Transformer; Agbala/Oke-Aga-Ilai Junction, Along Ilai Mopa Road; Ogbo/New Ere, Open Space Ogbo; Ero-Ife-Olukotun, Open Space Ero |
| Yagba East | Ife Olukotun II | Aroke, Open Space; Iyasin/Ilero Beside Alimi's Memorial Library-Near Old Post Office; Aira/Ijemu Along The Market Road Ifeolukotun; Iyasin/Ilero II Near Awara Market; Sekinota/Osanran-Osanran Yelgea Primary School |
| Yagba East | Ponyan | Oketan Ogba-Owu, Beside 1st Ecwa Odo Ponyan Opposite Post Office; Oke Oba, Open Space; Abudo Oke Ponyan-Baptist Primary School; Oketan (Open Space) Oke Ponyan; Ilepa, Market Square Odo Ponyan; Ponyan Central, (Open Space) Market Square Odo-Ponyan; Oke-Ponyan, Oke Ampe Open Space. |
| Yagba East | Alu/Igbagun/Oranre | Alu Town Beside The Market Square; Igbagun/Ife Open Space Near The Market Square; Igbo Ero, Primary School Igbo Ero; Ohu Village, Open Space Near The School; Odo Amu Village Open Space; Oranre Village Infront Of Farmer's Store; Igbagun II Beside The Market Square; Alu Town Open Space Near The Central Market |
| Yagba East | Ejuku | Ogba Ogun Ife-Aga Lga Dispensary Ejuku; Otun-Ida, Odo Alo Otun Open Space; Oke Abete (Open Space); Oke Angba, Aud/Yelgea School; Ogba Ogun II Open Space Idi-Isin Odo Anku |
| Yagba East | Jege/Oke/Agi Ogbom/Isao | Jege Town School, Jege; Ogbom Town Open Space; Jege II Yelgea School Jege (Tehidire); Imela Village, Imela Oke Agi Junction Open Space; Aginmi Village Aginmi Primary School; Takete Isao Primary School, Opp. Isao Community Secondary School |
| Yagba East | Makutu I | New Layout Makutu, Opposite Kajola Market I; Obada, Open Space Near Obada Market Square; Odaro, Open Space, Odaro; Ibasun, Open Space Ibasun; New Layout Makutu, Open Space Kajola Market II |
| Yagba East | Makutu II | Itedo-Oba, Opp. St. Kizito's College Road Rcm/St. Joseph Primary School Old Site; Okegada, Opp. Old Ist Bank Plc Building Isanlu; Aiyetoro Itedo, Upper Area Court Area; Itedo-Oba II Near St. Kizito's College Junction |
| Yagba East | Itedo | Ijila/Aiyetoro Mopo, Open Space /Yelgea School Mopo; Ileloke/Bagido Yelgea/Kd School Bagido Open Space; Offin, On The Way To Isanlu Town Hall, St. Joseph Primary School N/S; Idorun Open Space Idorun; Ijowa Alaofin, Oke Oyi Junction Near Lga Bus Stop Ijowa; Irunda Old Site, Yelgea Primary School, Irunda Ile; Itedo Irunda Open Space; Ijowa Alaofin Open Space Lga Bus Stop Ijowa Isanlu |
| Yagba East | Ilafin/Idofin/Odo - Ogba | Okedori Ilafin I Yelgea School Ilafin; Iddo-Ojesha Near Market Site Iddo-Ojesha; Odogbe Village, Primary School; Idofin Village Open Space; Oyi Village Near Oyi Leprosarium Clinic; Iye Village, Open Space Iye.; Idofin II, Igboe Idofin Isanlu Open Space; Okedori Ilafin II Yelgea School Ilafin |
| Yagba West | Ejiba | Near Dispensary/Oke Oja/Offe/Okerepe; Near Postal Agency/Opetedo/Oke Dofin; Akitipa, Ejiba; Alaji, Eti Osa Ejiba; Ywlgea School, Iloo I; Ywlgea School, Iloo II; Ywlaea School, Okedofin; Okebukun, Ejiba |
| Yagba West | Odo Eri Okoto | Oke/Odo-Eri; Near Kolawole's House, Oke Efa; Ago Quarters, Odo-Eri; Postal Agency Area, Ero, Oka Aodi; Odo Dau/ Odo-Eri; Near Ainsila, Ero Comp.; Igakota, Igobe/Ejiba; Ogbaji, Odo Esa, Odo-Eri; Idau Compound/Odo-Eri |
| Yagba West | Odo Ere Oke Ere | Ywlgea Barike, Ipa, Ikoja, Abidom Atepa; Near Public Well At Isaba, Isaba; Oja Ope, Omieran/Oke Aga/Ayin Aro; Post Office Area, Agoloke; Open Space, Akata Village; Women Training Centre Area/Okutadudu, Akiata; Obayagba, Ogba Ogo, Idiagba/Odo-Ere; Yewa Compound Area, Yewa Okere; Ayo's House Area, Isedo, Ogede Oke-Ere; Ywlgea School Area, Aiyegunle, Isalere, Esia; Ayin, Agbede, Okedigba/Odo-Ere; Obayagba, Ogbaogo, Idiagba/Odo-Ere |
| Yagba West | Isaulu Esa/Okoloke/Okunran | Ipetu/Fulani/Hausa/ Isanlu-Essa; Ywlgea Area, Isanlu-Essa/Idale/Obo Eko; Ywlgea Area, Okoloke/Ehin Ogga/Ipetu; Okunran Village; Ileowa Loke Area, Okoloke/Okara, Ohun |
| Yagba West | Iyamerin/Igbaruku | Ywlgea School Area, Iyamerin, Oke Bukun/Iyamerin; Ywlgea School Area, Iyamerin; Ruth Road Igbaruku/Okalu/Ijomu; Okelero/Odo Agbede/ Igbaruku; Ywlgea Area Igbaruku/Okedofin/Iyan; Health Centre Area Igbaruku/Ofinlinba; Agure Area Igbaruku/Agure Compound |
| Yagba West | Odo Ara Omi Ogga | Ywlgea School, Odo Ara/Odo-Ara; Odo Agbon/Odoya/Okelero/ Omi; Ywlgea School Omi; Olorunsogo/Oke-Agbede/Okeolaja/ Ogga; Ywlgea Area, Ogga/Ogga II; Basic Health Centre Area/Ogga I; Oke Ako/Ayinle/Oke Aofin /Odo-Ara |
| Yagba West | Oke Egbe I | Ywlgea School, Oke-Egbe I/Apata/Idale/Itakete/Okedis; Health Centre Area/Hospital Junction/Abala Oke Egbe; Rest House Area/Oke Agada; Alade's House Area/Ayin Oribo; Agidi/Ofin Ran/Okedisin; Idale, Oke-Egbe I; Titcombe College Area/Nursing School/Titcombe College; Ayin, Ayin/ Oke-Egbe I |
| Yagba West | Oke Egbe II | Open Space/Egbe Tuntun; Open Space/Oba Tedo; Open Space/Iloko; Abu Market Area/Apoto/Ogbaonimosi; Open Space/Aiyetoro; Ile-Ejaarea Oke-Egbe/Iloko I; Ile-Ejaarea Oke-Egbe/Iloko II |
| Yagba West | Oke Egbe III | Mekun Cinema House Area/Bareke/Opada/Ipo; Ododi, Oke-Egbe II; Open Space/Okeleri/Babara; Open Space/Ori Eru Eti Jakuru; Ekuku Bareke, Oke-Egbe III |
| Yagba West | Oke Egbe IV | Open Space/Odofin Area I; Salvation Army School/Odofin Area II; Etiyara Bus Stop Area, Etiyara; Open Space, Ila; Ywlgea School Area/Ilemila |
| Yagba West | Odo Egbe I | Shoemaker's Area/Isaba Area; Ijagan; Ogbale I; Ogbale II; Carpenter's Area/Aiyeroju; Open Space, Odoyagan |
| Yagba West | Odo Egbe II | Ogbale, Odo Egbe; School Clinic Area/Ajewo/Awarun; Ywlgea School Area/Gbagudu/Awarun; Shoemaker's Area/Odorom; Shoemaker's Area/Kati; Open Space, Gbagudu; Open Space, Etija; Open Space, Odo-Otun |
| Yagba West | Odo Egbe | Open Space, Ijalu I; Open Space, Ijalu II; Adefola's Restaurant Area/Oke Ifon Ijalu; Open Space, Oluwo; Iga/Iwoye; Open Space, Odoye I; Open Space, Odoye II; Open Space, Ajaforonti |
