= Ijagbe =

Village in Nigeria

Coordinates: 8°11′00″N 5°52′55″E

Ijagbe is a village located in the Kogi State of Nigeria.
