= Alu village =

Village in Yagba East, Kogi State, Nigeria

Alu Àlù
- Village
- Location in Nigeria
- Coordinates: 8°03′30″N 5°45′20″E
- Country: Nigeria
- State: Kogi State
- LGA: Yagba East

Government
  - Type: Traditional chieftaincy
  - Traditional head: Oba of Alu
- Elevation: 385 m (1,263 ft)
- Time zone: UTC+1 (WAT)
- Postal code: 262102
- ISO 3166 code: NG.KO.YE

Alu (Yoruba: Àlù) is a rural village in the Yagba East Local Government Area of Kogi State, Nigeria. It forms part of the Ekiti-speaking region of Kogi State and is listed among the settlements within Yagba East.

== Geography ==
Alu is located at approximately 8°03′30″N 5°45′20″E within a tropical savanna environment. The village is situated south of Isanlu, the administrative centre of Yagba East LGA, on gently undulating terrain with scattered rock outcrops and seasonal streams.

== Economy ==
Agriculture is the primary economic activity in Alu. Residents engage in small-scale farming, producing crops such as yam, cassava, maize, sorghum, millet, cashew and oil palm. Livestock rearing, including goats, sheep and poultry, contributes to household income, alongside petty trading.

== Culture and society ==
The village is inhabited mainly by the Ekiti Yoruba people, who speak the Yagba dialect of Yoruba. Christianity is the predominant religion, with a presence of Islamic and traditional belief practices. Community leadership is headed by the Oba of Alu within a traditional chieftaincy structure.

== Education and infrastructure ==
Alu is served by public schools that provide primary and secondary education to residents. Electricity supply is sourced from the national grid and supplemented by generators and solar systems. Mobile telecommunications services are available, and the village is connected to nearby communities by laterite roads linked to regional routes in Yagba East.
