= Amuro, Nigeria =

Nigerian town

Coordinates: 5.794°N 7.296°E

Amuro is a town in Kogi State, Nigeria.
