= Ejule =

- Coordinates: 7°21′35″N 7°6′9″E

Ejule is a town in Ofu local government area in Kogi State of Nigeria.
