= Okeagi =

Village in Mopamuro, Kogi State, Nigeria

- Village
- Location within Nigeria
- Country: Nigeria
- State: Kogi State
- LGA: Mopamuro
- Time zone: UTC+1 (WAT)

Okeagi is a village in the Mopamuro Local Government Area of Kogi State, Nigeria. It lies along the road connecting Mopa, the LGA headquarters, to Imela; residents describe this 14-kilometre stretch of road as being in poor condition and have repeatedly called on government to repair it.

== Economy ==
Community leaders describe Okeagi as an important source of food supply for Mopamuro LGA on account of its farmland. A 2026 academic study assessed deforestation and soil degradation in the Okeagi area, examining environmental pressures associated with land use in the locality.

== Infrastructure and government ==
The Okeagi–Ilai road, along with the nearby Orokere–Takete Ide road, has been repeatedly cited by Leke Abejide, member of the House of Representatives for Yagba Federal Constituency, as among the Mopamuro-area roads requiring rehabilitation; as of mid-2025 the roads were reported to be under assessment for cost estimates rather than under construction.

In May 2026, Abejide, through the Leke Abejide Foundation, disbursed community empowerment funds totalling ₦130 million across several Mopamuro communities, with Okeagi, Illai, Ilemo and Ijagbe each receiving ₦10 million. Okeagi was represented at the event by Chief Andero Titus.

Okeagi Local Government Secondary School serves the community. In June 2026, Kogi State's Commissioner for Education, Wemi Jones, visited the school to monitor the ongoing West African Examination Council (WAEC) exams and to inspect the renovation of three classroom blocks funded by the Henry Adetayo Foundation under the state's School Adoption and Mentorship Programme.

== Culture ==
Okeagi holds an annual community celebration, Okeagi Day, first staged in 1993 and held most years since (it was skipped in 2020 and 2021 because of the COVID-19 pandemic). The event combines a yam harvest festival with fundraising for community development projects. Groundbreaking for a town hall project took place during the 2019 celebration, at which N6.5 million was raised; the 2022 edition, themed around the town hall project and road repairs, raised a further N25 million and drew attendance from state officials, including the Mopamuro LGA chairman and the Kogi State Commissioner for Information, as well as federal and state political figures with ties to the area.

== Security ==
In December 2025, Okeagi and the neighbouring community of Illai were struck by a coordinated armed attack that also hit a nearby church, resulting in deaths and abductions and prompting public responses from a Kogi West senator and the state's Commissioner for Information. In February 2026, the state government temporarily closed markets and motor parks across several Mopamuro communities, including Okeagi, as part of a security operation in which 16 kidnap victims were rescued.
