= Okenyi =

Coordinates: 7°19′N 7°47′E

Okenyi is a town located in the east of Ankpa Local Government Area of Kogi State, Nigeria. It is home to the Igalas who migrated from Idah to settle in the area.

The town has a population of around 10,000 inhabitants. The people of Okenyi are farmers, engaged in subsistence farming, and farm principally cassava, maize, yam, and beans. The nature of the area's soil does not allow the cultivation of rice. The political structure has the Onu-okenyi as the paramount ruler, although a reigning chief assumes the throne after the death of a former ruling chief.
