= Kanaung =

Kanaung ကနောင်မြို့
- Town
- Interactive map of Kanaung
- Coordinates: 18.216°N 95.381°E
- Country: Myanmar
- Region: Ayeyarwady Region
- District: Myanaung District
- Township: Myanaung Township

Area
  - Total: 1.38 sq mi (3.6 km^{2})

Population (2023)
  - Total: 3,708
  - Density: 2,690/sq mi (1,040/km^{2})
- Time zone: UTC+6:30 (MMT)

Kanaung (Burmese: ကနောင်မြို့) is a town in Myanaung Township, Ayeyarwady Region, south-west Myanmar. The town is located on the western bank of the Irrawaddy River in the eastern part of its township and has 5 urban wards numbered from one through five.

== History ==
In 1846, the Mindat myoza was reassigned governorship to the town of Kanaung during the reign of Pagan Min. The newly renamed Kanaung Mintha would then overthrow the king in 1853 to install his older brother Mindon Min. Kanaung Mintha then became the crown prince, known for his role in modernising and attempting to industrialise the Konbaung Dynasty before his assassination.

On 3 September 1973, the town of Kanaung was formally re-established as town within Myanaung Township.
