= Ingapu =

Ingapu အင်္ဂပူမြို့
- Town
- Location in Myanmar
- Coordinates: 17°48′32″N 95°16′27″E
- Country: Myanmar
- Region: Ayeyarwady Region
- District: Myanaung District
- Township: Ingapu Township

Area
  - Total: 1.54 sq mi (4.0 km^{2})

Population (2019)
  - Total: 190,412
  - Density: 124,000/sq mi (47,700/km^{2})
- Time zone: UTC+6:30 (MMT)

Ingapu (Burmese: အင်္ဂပူမြို့) is a town in the Ayeyarwady Division of south-west Myanmar. It is the seat of the Ingapu Township in the Myanaung District located along the Ngawun River.

== History ==
The lost city described as Pinle Pyu (lit. 'Sea Pyu') is recorded as being located next to the sea. Unlike many other small Pyu sites, the city is speculated to be large in size located downstream from the Sri Ksetra Kingdom. Some archaeologist believe that a walled ancient religious complex 15 miles west of Ingapu may be the location of Pinle Pyu, one of the lost Pyu city-states. Historians who studied the site in 2009 concluded the site may be a Pyu site based on the use of Brahmi script, a script that dates towards the third century BC, and the architectural similarities to other Pyu sites. The site is currently a religious site owned by the clergy of the Kyapyin Religious Zone.

The ancient ruin was excavated in 2014 dated to determine if the 2,000-year-old artifacts were of the Pyu culture or not. However, more evidence and investigation is required to analyze the ancient artifacts found in the site and from nearby sites. The site has faced challenges with becoming a protected site. In the 2000s, an area that may have been an ancient elephant stockade was reclaimed by a company and destroyed during development.

Ingapu, the modern town, was named as one of the 32 surrounding villages of Pathein by the ancient king Samuddha Gotha's wife Omar Dhanti. By the time of the Konbaung Dynasty the group of villages was known as Okpho when it was given to Thihaboh Min after Alaungpaya's conquests. The name Okhpo originates, by legend, from the village's role baking bricks for the Shwemokhtaw Pagoda in Pathein during the time of Omar Dhanti. The town was renamed in 1852 to its ancient name of Ingapu after the Second Anglo-Burmese War by the British to distinguish it from Okpho in Bago Region.
