= Myanaung =

Myanaung မြန်အောင်မြို့
- Town
- Interactive map of Myanaung
- Coordinates: 18°17′N 95°19′E
- Country: Myanmar
- Region: Ayeyarwady Region
- District: Myanaung District
- Township: Myanaung Township

Area
  - Total: 2.58 sq mi (6.7 km^{2})

Population (2023)
  - Total: 8,318
  - Density: 3,220/sq mi (1,240/km^{2})
  - Religions: Buddhism
- Time zone: UTC+6.30 (MMT)

Myanaung (MYAN-owng, Burmese: မြန်အောင်မြို့, [mjàɰ̃ ʔàʊɰ̃ mjo̰]) is a town in northern Ayeyarwady Region of south-west Myanmar. It is the capital of Myanaung District and the administrative seat of Myanaung Township. The town has six urban wards, numbered one through six going from the north to the south. The town is located along the western bank of the Irrawaddy River and serves as a railway and waterway stop between Lower Myanmar and Kyangin. The Light Infantry Battalion 51 is based just outside of Ward 6 next to the Industrial Zone serving the town.

The town of Myanaung was founded around the year 1250 by as a Mon settlement called Gu Htut (ဂူထွတ်). The area was conquered by Alaungpaya during the Konbaung–Hanthawaddy War in 1754. He renamed the town Myanaung, (lit. 'Succeed quickly') after bringing the town to prominence by winning a naval battle in the area.
