= Ingapu Township =

Ingapu Township အင်္ဂပူမြို့နယ်
- Township
- Location in Myanaung district
- Coordinates: 17°50′N 92°48′E
- Country: Myanmar
- Region: Ayeyarwady Region
- District: Myanaung District
- Capital: Ingapu

Area
  - Total: 628.20 sq mi (1,627.03 km^{2})
- Highest elevation: 3,973 ft (1,211 m)
- Lowest elevation: 27 ft (8.2 m)

Population (2023)
  - Total: 212,371
  - Density: 338.063/sq mi (130.527/km^{2})
  - Ethnicities: Bamar; Karen
- Time zone: UTC+6:30 (MMT)

Ingapu Township (Burmese: အင်္ဂပူမြို့နယ်) is a township of Myanaung District in the Ayeyarwady Division of Myanmar. It is located in southern Myanaung District bordering Myanaung Township to the north. To the south, it borders Hinthada Township's townships of Hinthada Township and Lemyethna Township. The Township borders Letpadan Township and Monyo Township in Bago Region to the east and Gwa Township in Rakhine State to the west.

Ingapu township consists of 3 towns, 12 wards, 72 village tracts and 639 villages. The township's three towns are the principal town Ingapu and the towns of Htoogyi and Mazaligone.

== History ==
The lost city described as Pinle Pyu (lit. 'Sea Pyu') is recorded as being located next to the sea. Unlike many other small Pyu sites, the city is speculated to be large in size located downstream from the Sri Ksetra Kingdom. Some archaeologist believe that a walled religious complex in Gyogon, Ingapu Township may be the location of Pinle Pyu. The complex uses Brahmi script indicating its potential age. The ancient ruin was excavated in 2014 dated to determine if the 2,000-year-old artifacts were of the Pyu culture or not. Early human footprints were found in Taungnyo mountain near Kyauktalone village 2 miles west of the main site. These fossils along with other artifacts from the Taungnyo site including Paleolithic tools may indicate that the Ingapu site is older than other Pyu city-states.

The city of Ingapu was named as one of the 32 surrounding villages of Pathein by the ancient king Samuddha Gotha's wife Omar Dhanti. By the time of the Konbaung Dynasty the group of villages was known as Okhpo when it was given to Thihaboh Min after Alaungpaya's conquests. The name Okhpo originates, by legend, from the village's role baking bricks for the Shwemokhtaw Pagoda in Pathein during the time of Omar Dhanti. The town was renamed in 1852 to its ancient name of Ingapu after the Second Anglo-Burmese War by the British to distinguish it from Okpho in Bago Region.

The township was first established independent from Myanaung Township in 1972 under the first township administrator Maung Tin.

== Geography ==
Ingapu Township is located within the Irrawaddy Delta and includes part of the Arakan Mountains in its west. The highest point in the town reaches over 3,900 feet (1,200 m) on the border with Rakhine State. The elevation slopes from the foothills in the central-western part of the township towards the Irrawaddy River on the Township's eastern border with Bago Region.

The primary waterway serving the town of Ingapu is the Ngawun River. The township typically sees 88.5 days of rain a year totalling an average of 70.03 inches (177.9 cm) of rain a year. Erosion and flood damage destroyed over 300 homes between 2015 and 2019. The township has 8 major dams. The waterways within the township are volatile and changing significantly as quickly as within four years.

The forested foothills of the Arakan mountains in the township's west is home to many species with little human development. The township has 60% forest cover with 25% being protected natural areas. Among others, the township has teak, Kanyin and Burmese laurel trees are notable tree species. The township is home to elephants, tigers, wild boars, black bears and deer among others. The township is also a malaria-endemic region.

== Demographics and Economy ==
Historical Population
Year	Ingapu Township	±%
2014	214,384	—
2019	218,242	+1.8%
2022	220,480	+1.0%
2023	212,371	−3.7%
Source: Ministry of Labor, Immigration, and Population and General Administration Department data

Ingapu Township is overwhelmingly rural with 89.8% (196,017 people) of the township living outside of the singular town of Ingapu as of 2019. The gender ratio is 1.006 with more men than the national average. 92.67% of the township are Bamar and 92.4% of the population is Buddhist. The second largest religion is Christianity concentrated mostly within Ingapu town. The mean household size is 3.7 people. In 2023, the population of the township dropped, losing 8,109 people between 2022 and 2023.

By 2023, two other villages were designated as towns. Ingpau remains the largest town with 19,412 people followed by Htoogyi with 8439 people and Mazaligone with 6945 people.

Agriculture is the primary industry of Ingapu Township. The main crop grown is rice with peanuts and various lentils as secondary off-season crops. There is also a small but significant poultry industry in the township. Fishing and fisheries also make up a significant portion of the town's economic output. The heavily wooded landscape of western Ingapu Township sees some forestry, but is limited by environmental protection areas. The township has transportation infrastructure by waterway and roads connecting it to its main market, Hinthada.

== See also ==
- List of villages in Ingapu Township
