= Myanaung Township =

Township in Ayeyarwady Region, Myanmar

Myanaung Township မြန်အောင်မြို့နယ်
- Township
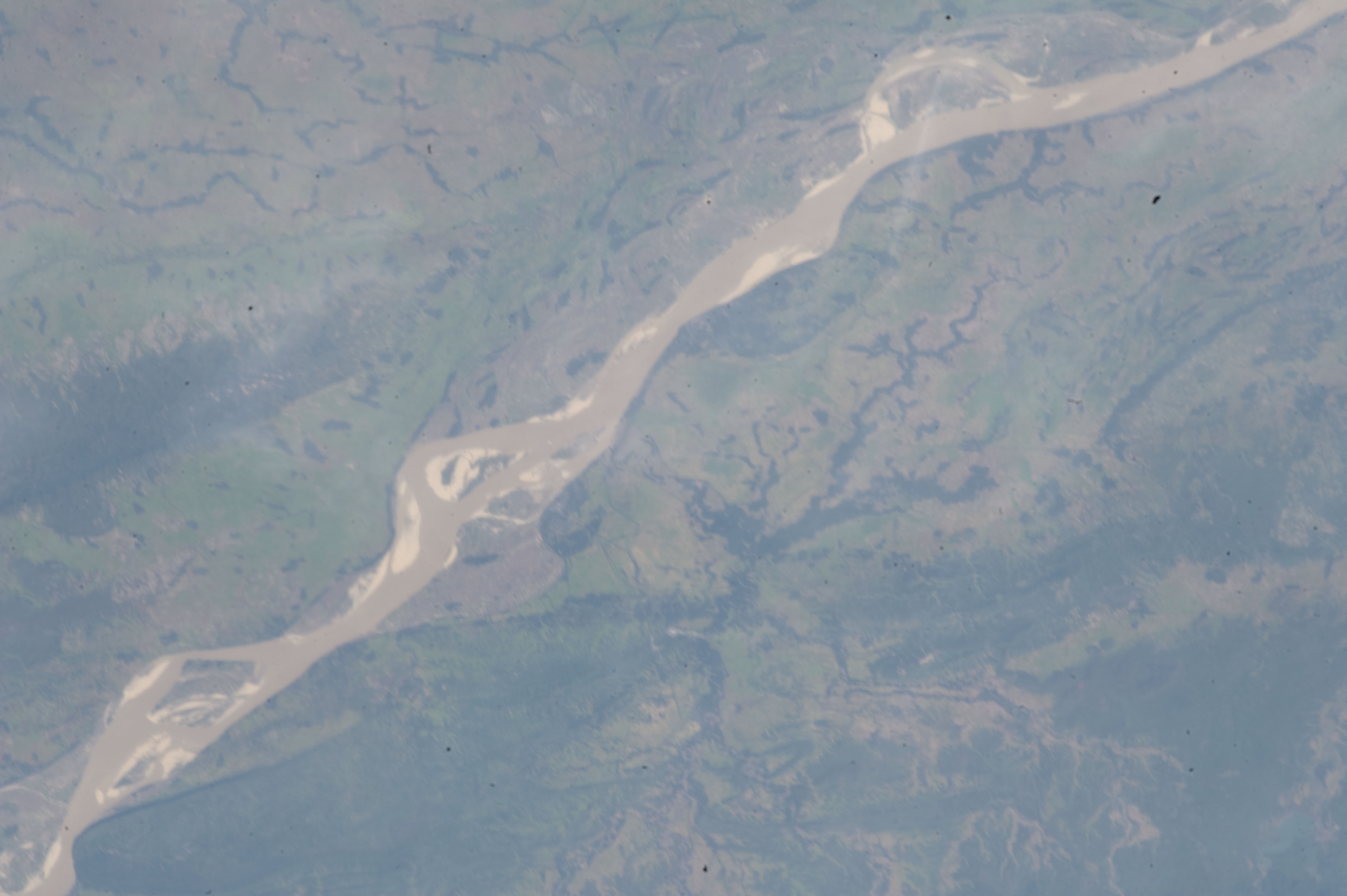
- View of Myanaung area from space

- Location in Myanaung district
- Coordinates: 18°15′53″N 95°17′28″E
- Country: Myanmar
- Division: Ayeyarwady Region
- District: Myanaung District
- Capital: Myanaung

Area
  - Total: 599.314 sq mi (1,552.22 km^{2})
- Elevation: 67 ft (20 m)
- Highest elevation: 4,124 ft (1,257 m)

Population (2023)
  - Total: 218,611
  - Density: 364.769/sq mi (140.838/km^{2})
- Time zone: UTC+6:30 (MMT)

Myanaung Township (MYAN-owng, Burmese: မြန်အောင်မြို့နယ်) is a township of Myanaung District in northern Ayeyarwady Region, Myanmar. Before 2022, the township was part of Hinthada District.

Myaunaung Township's western border with Rakhine State follows the Arakan Mountains dividing it from Taungup Township and Gwa Township. It borders the other two township in its district with Kyangin Township to the north and Ingapu Township to south. Their eastern border is defined by the Irrawaddy River dividing it from Bago Region's Monyo Township across the river. The township has 3 towns- the principal town of Myanaung, as well as the towns of Kanaung and Inpin, who have combined total of 15 urban wards. The township additionally has 58 village tracts grouping together 494 villages.

== History ==
The town of Myanaung was founded around the year 1250 by as a Mon settlement called Gu Htut (ဂူထွတ်). The area was conquered by Alaungpaya during the Konbaung–Hanthawaddy War in 1754. He renamed the town Myanaung, (lit. 'Succeed quickly') after bringing the town to prominence by winning a naval battle in the area. Later, the town of Kanaung within the township would game notability again for its governor Kanaung Mintha who successfully usurped the king Pagan Min in 1853 and became an industrial moderniser for the country.

The township and town was re-established most recently on 28 February 1973.

== Geography ==
Myanaung Township geography is defined by the Irrawaddy River in its east forming most of its townships' transportation waterway as it flows south towards the Irrawaddy Delta. Smaller streams flow from the higher elevations of the Arakan Mountains in the western part of the township into the Irrawaddy River. The tallest peak in Ayeyarwady Region, Mt. Myanaung, lies on the township's border with Rakhine State with an peak elevation of 4,124 feet (1,257 m) above sea level. Notable streams include the Hpatashae and the Mamya streams.

39.44% of the township is covered in protected forests with the largest being the Myanaung Mountain Forest Reserve and the second being the similarly sized Myinwa Mountain Forest Reserve shared with its northern neighbour Kyangin Township. In the centre of the township, there are three significant protected forests including the Sintay Forest Reserve located along the Pathein-Kyangin railway. The township has a variety of flora and fauna as a result of these protected areas including elephants, deer, gaur, peacocks, mountain goats and leopards. The township also has a diverse array of flora from teak, myaukchaw, lebbek and sal trees and various species of other flora like devil peppers, thabyay and the daurian moonseed. The township additionally has the critically endangered critically endangered Shorea oblongifolia tree.

== Demographics ==
Historical Population
Year	Kyangin Township	±%
1881	44,711	—
1891	40,507	−9.4%
1983	206,807	+410.5%
2014	218,581	+5.7%
2018	228,150	+4.4%
2019	228,234	+0.0%
2022	229,558	+0.6%
2023	218,611	−4.8%
Source: Census and GAD data

During British rule in Burma, the township's population was record in the 40,000 range, although the land areas included in the Myanaung Township in that time changed between 1881 and 1891. In 1983, the census recording 206,807 people in the township. By 2019, that population had only grown slightly to 228,234 people. The population peaked in 2022 at 229,558 people losing 11,466 people between 2022 and 2023.

The 2014 Myanmar census showed the township with a median age at 31.2 years of age. The township mostly relied on corrugated sheet metal and plant materials for housing materials. 92.4% of the population primarily used firewood as their source of heating. Over 60% of the population used bicycles for daily commute and 38.2% of households had access to a television. As of 2023, the population is primarily Bamar and Buddhist, making up 94% and 96% of the population respectively.

== Economy and Transport ==
Myanaung township's economy is primary industry is agriculture, primarily growing rice and legumes- particularly matpe, peanuts, green beans and sesame. Mango and onion are additionally significant products of the township. The township's agricultural industry relies on exports while acting as a import-export intermediary between Yangon, Pathein Pyay and Hinthada. The majority of farmers in the township fall within the 56 to 65 age range, with 57% of all workers in 2018 being over the age of 46. The most productive farms in the area are managed and worked by older farmers who rely in the Myanma Agricultural Development Bank for credit to finance components like rice seeds, fertiliser and pesticides.

Myanaung primarily developed as a railway stop between Pathein and Kyangin as well as a river port between Upper an Lower Burma on the Irrawaddy River. In 1964, oil was found in the township spurring an oil well development in the area.

== See also ==
- List of villages in Myanaung Township
