= List of villages in Myanaung Township =

This is a list of villages in Myanaung Township, Hinthada District, Ayeyarwady Region, Burma (Myanmar).

Village	Village code	Village tract	Coordinates (links to map & photo sources)	Notes
Kyone ka Monstry	12345679	In Pin	18.1098°N 95.2816°E	
Meik Tha Lin Chaung	152966	In Pin	18.0767°N 95.2852°E	
Ta Dar Kwin Gyi	152965	In Pin	18.0955°N 95.2828°E	
Ah Shey Kone	152964	In Pin	18.0945°N 95.273°E	
Sat Thwar Chaung	152963	In Pin	18.0799°N 95.2797°E	
In Pin	152952	In Pin	18.0928°N 95.2683°E	
San	152971	In Pin		
Ywar Tan Shey	152970	In Pin	18.0904°N 95.2987°E	
Ah Nyar Su	152973	In Pin	18.0915°N 95.3023°E	
Ta Dar Kwin Ka Lay	152960	In Pin	18.0998°N 95.2785°E	
Gant Ga Lar Chaung	152974	In Pin	18.0917°N 95.286°E	
Kan Gyi	152959	In Pin	18.1137°N 95.2691°E	
Kone Gyi	152967	In Pin	18.0743°N 95.2896°E	
Gone Paing	152961	In Pin		
Gway Kone	152969	In Pin	18.0865°N 95.2967°E	
Lel Di Koke	152953	In Pin	18.0816°N 95.2616°E	
Gon Hnyin Tan	152954	In Pin	18.0776°N 95.2512°E	
Shar Hpyu Kone	152958	In Pin	18.106°N 95.2718°E	
Oe Bo Kone	152957	In Pin		
Kyaung Kone	152972	In Pin	18.0937°N 95.2855°E	
Ah Nauk Kone	152955	In Pin		
Myaung Gyi	152956	In Pin		
Taung Ni Lay	152968	In Pin	18.089°N 95.2916°E	
Mee Laung Kwin	161741	Tha Pyay Kone	18.2923°N 95.2748°E	
Ein Gyi Kone	161744	Tha Pyay Kone	18.2683°N 95.2798°E	
Yae Nit Kwin	161742	Tha Pyay Kone	18.2769°N 95.2793°E	
Htan Pin Kone	161740	Tha Pyay Kone	18.2885°N 95.2623°E	
Tha Pyay Kone	161739	Tha Pyay Kone	18.2822°N 95.268°E	
Tei Kone	161738	Tha Pyay Kone	18.2969°N 95.2848°E	
Shauk Kwin	161743	Tha Pyay Kone	18.2734°N 95.2733°E	
Pan Nyo Kwin	154862	Kwin Gyi Daunt	18.2724°N 95.2611°E	
Pay Kone	154860	Kwin Gyi Daunt	18.262°N 95.2698°E	
Htauk Kyant Kone	154858	Kwin Gyi Daunt	18.2749°N 95.2509°E	
Pyayt Zin Kwin	154861	Kwin Gyi Daunt	18.2689°N 95.2534°E	
Gway Kone	154857	Kwin Gyi Daunt	18.2733°N 95.2677°E	
Htan Pin Kone	154856	Kwin Gyi Daunt	18.2631°N 95.2615°E	
Kant Lant Kone	154855	Kwin Gyi Daunt	18.267°N 95.2715°E	
Kwin Gyi Daunt	154854	Kwin Gyi Daunt	18.2778°N 95.2582°E	
Nyaung Kone	154859	Kwin Gyi Daunt	18.2829°N 95.2604°E	
Kya Khat Tan	157919	Myit Kyoe	18.3099°N 95.2908°E	
Mar La Kar Kone	157920	Myit Kyoe	18.3108°N 95.2863°E	
Myit Kyoe	157917	Myit Kyoe	18.3203°N 95.2675°E	
Ah Su Gyi Ywar Thit	157918	Myit Kyoe	18.319°N 95.2622°E	
Nat Pa Tee	158088	Nat Pa Tee	18.308°N 95.2716°E	
Kyauk Tan	158089	Nat Pa Tee	18.2917°N 95.2507°E	
Htauk Kyant Kone	158090	Nat Pa Tee		
Chin Su	158094	Nat Pa Tee	18.2977°N 95.2518°E	
Sa Bai Ka Yo	158091	Nat Pa Tee	18.3067°N 95.2547°E	
Na Lin Thar	158092	Nat Pa Tee	18.3157°N 95.2645°E	
Ywar Thit Kone	158093	Nat Pa Tee		
Chin Kone	158009	Myo Ma Te Gyi Kone		
Hpet Kone	158010	Myo Ma Te Gyi Kone		
Shan Su	158008	Myo Ma Te Gyi Kone		
Myo Ma Te Gyi Kone	158007	Myo Ma Te Gyi Kone		
Bar Wa Nar Kone	158011	Myo Ma Te Gyi Kone	18.2861°N 95.3046°E	
Maung Pauk Kone	158012	Myo Ma Te Gyi Kone	18.2816°N 95.3056°E	
Ywar Thit Kone	158013	Myo Ma Te Gyi Kone		
Pyin Htaung Twin	158500	Nyaung Myit Swea	18.2596°N 95.3059°E	
Thea Chaung	158498	Nyaung Myit Swea	18.2653°N 95.3047°E	
Tha Pyay Hla	158499	Nyaung Myit Swea	18.2545°N 95.3159°E	
Aung Ya Ta Nar	158501	Nyaung Myit Swea		
Pyay Taw Thar Ywar Thit	158497	Nyaung Myit Swea	18.2667°N 95.3104°E	
Htan Kone	158496	Nyaung Myit Swea	18.252°N 95.3184°E	
Ywar Thit Kone	158495	Nyaung Myit Swea		
Nyaung Myit Swea	158494	Nyaung Myit Swea	18.272°N 95.3048°E	
Ku Lar Kone	158502	Nyaung Myit Swea	18.2511°N 95.2965°E	
Nyaung Pin Kwin	160036	Se	18.2277°N 95.261°E	
Gway Cho	160027	Se	18.2222°N 95.2396°E	
Za Yat Kone	160029	Se	18.2171°N 95.2548°E	
Gaung Hpyat Taw	160031	Se	18.218°N 95.2648°E	
Kyoet Kone	160032	Se	18.2209°N 95.2629°E	
Hpoe So Kone	160033	Se	18.2396°N 95.2635°E	
Se	160026	Se	18.214°N 95.2485°E	
Htauk Kyant Kwin	160035	Se	18.2269°N 95.2684°E	
Ywar Thit Kone	160028	Se	18.2412°N 95.2654°E	
Pay Pin Chaung	160037	Se	18.2315°N 95.2528°E	
Ta Loke Kone	160038	Se	18.2287°N 95.2451°E	
Yae Kan	160039	Se	18.2452°N 95.2606°E	
Yoe Zaung	160040	Se	18.2476°N 95.2438°E	
Chan Kone	160041	Se	18.2131°N 95.235°E	
Ma Gyi Pauk Kone	160034	Se	18.2349°N 95.2687°E	
Pan Tain Kone	160030	Se	18.2202°N 95.2532°E	
Sein Gyi	159847	San Ni Chaung		
Than Oe Kin	159848	San Ni Chaung	18.2573°N 95.2694°E	
Kan Bay Kwin	159846	San Ni Chaung	18.2411°N 95.2728°E	
Tha Yet Kone	159845	San Ni Chaung	18.2509°N 95.2434°E	
San Ni Chaung	159844	San Ni Chaung	18.253°N 95.2748°E	
Yae Kan (West)	159849	San Ni Chaung		
Yin Taw Lay	161120	Tar Gwa Te Gyi Kone		
Tar Gwa	161121	Tar Gwa Te Gyi Kone	18.2043°N 95.2568°E	
Gyin Khar Kone (Ah Shey Su)	161122	Tar Gwa Te Gyi Kone	18.1918°N 95.2701°E	
Gaung Hpyat Taw	161119	Tar Gwa Te Gyi Kone	18.215°N 95.2673°E	
Kauk Swa Kwin	161118	Tar Gwa Te Gyi Kone		
Gyin Khar Kone	161116	Tar Gwa Te Gyi Kone	18.1944°N 95.2668°E	
Te Gyi Kone	161115	Tar Gwa Te Gyi Kone	18.203°N 95.2388°E	
Hpa Yar Kone	161117	Tar Gwa Te Gyi Kone	18.1973°N 95.2611°E	
Hpa Yar Gyi Kone	154728	Kun Taw	18.1896°N 95.2228°E	
Ohn Kone	154726	Kun Taw	18.1811°N 95.2579°E	
Nyaung Kone	154727	Kun Taw	18.1753°N 95.2499°E	
Za Yit Htu	154724	Kun Taw	18.1763°N 95.2286°E	
Khat Ti Ya	154725	Kun Taw	18.1788°N 95.2646°E	
Kun Taw	154723	Kun Taw	18.1808°N 95.2386°E	
Kone Ta Lone	153706	Ka Zun Khon	18.2245°N 95.3392°E	
Zee Taw	153707	Ka Zun Khon		
Ywar Thit Su	153705	Ka Zun Khon	18.2286°N 95.3753°E	
Tha Pyay Seik	153704	Ka Zun Khon	18.2354°N 95.3659°E	
Mon Taing	153703	Ka Zun Khon	18.2286°N 95.3637°E	
Ka Zun Khon	153702	Ka Zun Khon	18.237°N 95.3604°E	
Htan Kone	160253	Shar Taw	18.2505°N 95.3187°E	
Yae Lel Kyun (Shar Taw)	160256	Shar Taw		
Shar Taw	160250	Shar Taw	18.2603°N 95.3372°E	
Tei Kone	160251	Shar Taw	18.2409°N 95.3256°E	
Sat Pyar Kyin	160252	Shar Taw	18.248°N 95.3156°E	
Pan Be Kone	160254	Shar Taw	18.2427°N 95.3199°E	
Ohn Kone	160255	Shar Taw	18.2514°N 95.3144°E	
Chaung Yoe Kone	156685	Lay Tu Gyi	18.1065°N 95.3783°E	
Lay Tu Gyi	156681	Lay Tu Gyi	18.1352°N 95.3614°E	
Moe Ma Kha	156683	Lay Tu Gyi	18.121°N 95.3762°E	
Lay Tu Lay	156684	Lay Tu Gyi	18.1265°N 95.3685°E	
Kya Khat Chaung	156682	Lay Tu Gyi	18.1128°N 95.3834°E	
Kywe Te Kone	156437	Kywe Te Kone	18.1588°N 95.3891°E	
Oke Pon	156448	Kywe Te Kone	18.1494°N 95.3559°E	
Taung Yar Gyi Kone	156447	Kywe Te Kone	18.1612°N 95.3602°E	
Daunt Gyi	156446	Kywe Te Kone	18.1355°N 95.3676°E	
Nyaung Win	156445	Kywe Te Kone	18.1465°N 95.3932°E	
Htan Pin Kone	156444	Kywe Te Kone	18.172°N 95.3836°E	
Aing Ka Law	156443	Kywe Te Kone	18.1762°N 95.3813°E	
Lay Ba Maw	156442	Kywe Te Kone	18.1597°N 95.3627°E	
Nyaung Kone	156441	Kywe Te Kone	18.1677°N 95.3777°E	
Gyan	156440	Kywe Te Kone	18.1459°N 95.3636°E	
Hnget Gyi Thaik	156438	Kywe Te Kone	18.1804°N 95.3734°E	
Lay Ba Maw Ywar Thit	156439	Kywe Te Kone	18.1565°N 95.3605°E	
Ywar Thit Kone	159171	Pauk Kone Sun	18.1654°N 95.3657°E	
Gon Hnyin Tan	159168	Pauk Kone Sun	18.177°N 95.3741°E	
War Taw Hle	159172	Pauk Kone Sun	18.1702°N 95.3633°E	
Kayin Kone	159169	Pauk Kone Sun	18.1721°N 95.3645°E	
Pauk Kone Sun	159165	Pauk Kone Sun	18.1755°N 95.3615°E	
Pyoe Khin Chaung	159167	Pauk Kone Sun	18.1676°N 95.3607°E	
Kyar Inn Zoung	159166	Pauk Kone Sun	18.1864°N 95.3655°E	
Tha Yet Pin Zay	159170	Pauk Kone Sun	18.1822°N 95.3693°E	
Se Lay Yae Kyaw	158726	Oe Bo	18.1861°N 95.368°E	
Saing Su	158721	Oe Bo	18.2051°N 95.386°E	
Ka Naung Ka Lay	158722	Oe Bo	18.1919°N 95.3891°E	
Kyat Kwin	158723	Oe Bo	18.1913°N 95.3816°E	
Kun Chan Kone	158725	Oe Bo	18.2012°N 95.3854°E	
Oe Bo	158720	Oe Bo	18.1995°N 95.3875°E	
Htan Pin Kone	158724	Oe Bo	18.1951°N 95.3828°E	
Wet Toe	163193	Wet Toe	18.2199°N 95.3626°E	
Nat Sin Kwin	163197	Wet Toe	18.2207°N 95.3735°E	
Thee Pin Yoe	163196	Wet Toe	18.2143°N 95.363°E	
Kwin Thar	163199	Wet Toe	18.2031°N 95.3505°E	
Yin Taik Taw	163200	Wet Toe	18.1989°N 95.346°E	
Yae Twin Kone	163201	Wet Toe	18.2017°N 95.359°E	
Shan Su	163195	Wet Toe	18.21°N 95.3533°E	
Moke Soe Kwin	163198	Wet Toe	18.2078°N 95.3469°E	
Nyan Taw Kone	163194	Wet Toe	18.2176°N 95.3533°E	
Sar Hpyu Kone	162435	Thet Kei Kone	18.1723°N 95.2781°E	
Pauk Kone	162436	Thet Kei Kone	18.1694°N 95.2791°E	
Pyar Thar	162434	Thet Kei Kone	18.1814°N 95.2959°E	
Pauk Taw Ngu	162433	Thet Kei Kone	18.1819°N 95.2813°E	
Ohn Hne Inn	162432	Thet Kei Kone	18.1776°N 95.2865°E	
Thet Kei Kone	162430	Thet Kei Kone	18.1631°N 95.2814°E	
Zin Pyun Kone	162431	Thet Kei Kone	18.1795°N 95.275°E	
Shint Ni Yoe	162446	Thet Kei Kone	18.1422°N 95.3008°E	
Doke Yaik Kone	162438	Thet Kei Kone	18.1588°N 95.2968°E	
Te Kone	162454	Thet Kei Kone	18.1829°N 95.3029°E	
Min Kone	162452	Thet Kei Kone	18.1784°N 95.2957°E	
Ywar Thit Kone	162451	Thet Kei Kone	18.1591°N 95.2911°E	
Kant Ba Lu	162450	Thet Kei Kone	18.1642°N 95.3036°E	
La Har Dun	162449	Thet Kei Kone	18.1546°N 95.3113°E	
Kan Se Kone	162453	Thet Kei Kone	18.1528°N 95.2933°E	
Thit Seint Kone	162447	Thet Kei Kone	18.1537°N 95.2849°E	
Thin Taw Yoe	162437	Thet Kei Kone	18.1648°N 95.2849°E	
Daunt Gyi	162445	Thet Kei Kone	18.1375°N 95.2947°E	
Nga Thaing Inn	162444	Thet Kei Kone	18.1415°N 95.3077°E	
Pay Kone	162443	Thet Kei Kone	18.1472°N 95.3039°E	
Gway Taunk Myaung	162442	Thet Kei Kone	18.1512°N 95.3054°E	
Ka Thit Kone	162441	Thet Kei Kone	18.1556°N 95.2966°E	
Ah Yu Ma Kwin	162439	Thet Kei Kone	18.1568°N 95.2814°E	
Ta Dar U	162448	Thet Kei Kone	18.1789°N 95.2777°E	
Sin Gaung Aing	162440	Thet Kei Kone	18.1447°N 95.29°E	
Kyauk Taung	160618	Sin Thay	18.1625°N 95.2528°E	
Kan Ka Lay	160624	Sin Thay	18.1291°N 95.2639°E	
Htein Ngu	160622	Sin Thay	18.1556°N 95.261°E	
Le Kwin	160621	Sin Thay	18.1578°N 95.2636°E	
Sin Thay	160615	Sin Thay	18.1609°N 95.258°E	
Yae Thoe	160619	Sin Thay	18.1674°N 95.246°E	
Baw Di Kone	160623	Sin Thay	18.1547°N 95.2682°E	
Oke Shit Kone (Bu Tar)	160617	Sin Thay	18.1569°N 95.2475°E	
Ywar Thit	160616	Sin Thay	18.1611°N 95.234°E	
Pauk Kone	160620	Sin Thay	18.1673°N 95.2684°E	
Myanmar Kat Kho	154039	Kat Kho	18.1524°N 95.331°E	
Shan Kwin	154041	Kat Kho	18.1836°N 95.3234°E	
Kayin Kat Kho	154040	Kat Kho	18.1577°N 95.3207°E	
Ta Loke Htaw	154042	Kat Kho	18.1758°N 95.3143°E	
Gon Min Taw	154048	Kat Kho	18.1654°N 95.3181°E	
Let Pan Chaung	154047	Kat Kho	18.1848°N 95.3339°E	
Thaik War Kone	154049	Kat Kho	18.1689°N 95.3083°E	
Gway Tauk Kone (East)	154046	Kat Kho	18.1701°N 95.3415°E	
Gway Tauk Kone (West)	154045	Kat Kho	18.1688°N 95.3373°E	
Kwin Gyi Lay	154044	Kat Kho	18.1733°N 95.3299°E	
Kat Kho (Ah Nauk Su)	154038	Kat Kho	18.1528°N 95.3304°E	
Kwin Gyi	154043	Kat Kho	18.1779°N 95.3278°E	
Ma Gyi Kwin	164013	Zee Hpyu Kone	18.2001°N 95.3147°E	
Htauk Kyant Kwin	164012	Zee Hpyu Kone	18.2039°N 95.311°E	
Pan Taw Kwin	164011	Zee Hpyu Kone	18.1931°N 95.3294°E	
Zee Hpyu Kone	164010	Zee Hpyu Kone	18.1969°N 95.3233°E	
Shan Kwin	164014	Zee Hpyu Kone	18.1877°N 95.3274°E	
Htan Hnit Khwa	152679	Htan Thone Pin	18.2325°N 95.2841°E	
Kan Pay Kwin	152684	Htan Thone Pin	18.2383°N 95.2776°E	
Yoe Zaung	152683	Htan Thone Pin	18.2479°N 95.2556°E	
Lel Gyi Kwin	152682	Htan Thone Pin	18.2098°N 95.3002°E	
Thone Pin Saing	152680	Htan Thone Pin	18.2238°N 95.2856°E	
Kun Chan Kone	152678	Htan Thone Pin	18.223°N 95.2765°E	
Ah Nyar Su	152677	Htan Thone Pin	18.2296°N 95.2717°E	
Kyaung Su	152676	Htan Thone Pin	18.2218°N 95.2949°E	
Pay Kone	152675	Htan Thone Pin	18.2259°N 95.2997°E	
Htan Thone Pin	152674	Htan Thone Pin	18.215°N 95.2986°E	
Ah Nauk Kone	152681	Htan Thone Pin	18.2167°N 95.2877°E	
Sin Kyone Kwin	156515	La Har Pauk	18.2389°N 95.3037°E	
Wet Kaik	156513	La Har Pauk	18.2408°N 95.288°E	
Me Za Li Kwin	156517	La Har Pauk	18.2215°N 95.3084°E	
Gon Hnyin Tan	156518	La Har Pauk	18.2212°N 95.3016°E	
Hnaw Kone	156516	La Har Pauk	18.2294°N 95.3062°E	
La Har Pauk	156512	La Har Pauk	18.233°N 95.3007°E	
Pay Kone	156514	La Har Pauk	18.2295°N 95.3015°E	
Bwet Inn Kone	153466	Ka Nyin Ngu	18.0392°N 95.2768°E	
Chaung Thone Son	153471	Ka Nyin Ngu	18.0415°N 95.2888°E	
Kar Si Kwin	153468	Ka Nyin Ngu	18.0647°N 95.2802°E	
Ywar Thit	153467	Ka Nyin Ngu	18.0432°N 95.2681°E	
Ka Nyin Ngu	153464	Ka Nyin Ngu	18.0581°N 95.2751°E	
Yae Kyaw Kone	153465	Ka Nyin Ngu	18.0448°N 95.2802°E	
Kyauk Saung	153469	Ka Nyin Ngu	18.0348°N 95.2874°E	
Zee Kone	153470	Ka Nyin Ngu	18.0508°N 95.2917°E	
Kya Khat Tan	152881	Htu	18.0743°N 95.3324°E	
Ywar Thit Kone	152886	Htu		
Myauk Kyar Thay	152879	Htu	18.0814°N 95.3314°E	
Kyun Kone	152885	Htu	18.0985°N 95.3187°E	
Gyan Kone	152887	Htu	18.0736°N 95.3199°E	
Bwet Yoe	152884	Htu	18.0903°N 95.3278°E	
Gway Tauk Kone	152882	Htu	18.083°N 95.3363°E	
Sein Kone	152874	Htu	18.0655°N 95.3439°E	
Taung Kyar Thay	152880	Htu	18.0767°N 95.3347°E	
Kun Chan Kone	152891	Htu	18.0821°N 95.3056°E	
Nyaung Kone	152875	Htu	18.0691°N 95.3443°E	
Hpan Khar Kone	152883	Htu	18.0871°N 95.3382°E	
Bwet Kone	152876	Htu	18.0571°N 95.3435°E	
Ma Gyi Kone	152890	Htu	18.0785°N 95.3095°E	
Gaung To Pauk	152878	Htu	18.078°N 95.34°E	
Zee Kone	152877	Htu	18.0598°N 95.3397°E	
Kyoet Kone	152892	Htu	18.0588°N 95.3092°E	
Min Kone	152888	Htu	18.075°N 95.3178°E	
Ah Lel Su	152889	Htu	18.0765°N 95.3151°E	
Chaung Thone Son	155573	Kyet Thun Khin	18.0429°N 95.2913°E	
Kyet Thun Khin	155572	Kyet Thun Khin	18.0317°N 95.3054°E	
Nyaung Kone	155575	Kyet Thun Khin	18.0244°N 95.3084°E	
Myauk Yoe	155574	Kyet Thun Khin	18.039°N 95.3142°E	
Kyet Thun Khin (North)	155580	Kyet Thun Khin	18.0364°N 95.3034°E	
Chaung Nar	155579	Kyet Thun Khin	18.0423°N 95.2997°E	
Kyoet Kone	155578	Kyet Thun Khin	18.0544°N 95.306°E	
Hpa Yar Gyi Kone	155577	Kyet Thun Khin	18.0561°N 95.2967°E	
Pyin Ma Chaung	155576	Kyet Thun Khin	18.0463°N 95.303°E	
Zee Kone Ka Lay	161608	Tha Khut Kwin	18.1217°N 95.346°E	
Hpa Yar Kone	161605	Tha Khut Kwin	18.1435°N 95.3277°E	
Mee Laung Kwin	161607	Tha Khut Kwin	18.1367°N 95.3385°E	
Nay Win Kone	161609	Tha Khut Kwin	18.1275°N 95.3375°E	
Hput Ka Lay Zaung	161610	Tha Khut Kwin	18.1287°N 95.3424°E	
Baw Kwin	161611	Tha Khut Kwin	18.1364°N 95.3303°E	
Kyat Gyi	161603	Tha Khut Kwin	18.1544°N 95.3407°E	
Tha Khut Kwin	161602	Tha Khut Kwin	18.1411°N 95.3237°E	
Yae Ku Su	161604	Tha Khut Kwin	18.1542°N 95.3483°E	
Hpoe Soe Kone	161606	Tha Khut Kwin	18.1415°N 95.3324°E	
Tha Yet Kone	159355	Pein Inn	18.1206°N 95.3123°E	
Ah Lel Kyun	159353	Pein Inn	18.13°N 95.3032°E	
Pein Inn	159352	Pein Inn	18.1116°N 95.3201°E	
Thea Kone Gyi	159354	Pein Inn	18.129°N 95.324°E	
Shint Ni Sein	161384	Taw Kywe Lu	18.1236°N 95.335°E	
Moke Soe Aing	161379	Taw Kywe Lu	18.1171°N 95.3473°E	
Thar Hpyoe Kone	161390	Taw Kywe Lu	18.1189°N 95.327°E	
Kan Paw Kone	161389	Taw Kywe Lu	18.123°N 95.3307°E	
Kyun Taw Kone	161388	Taw Kywe Lu	18.1044°N 95.3241°E	
Kyaung Su	161387	Taw Kywe Lu	18.1021°N 95.348°E	
Hman Ni Kone	161386	Taw Kywe Lu	18.0978°N 95.3372°E	
Ku Lar Kone	161385	Taw Kywe Lu	18.1164°N 95.3252°E	
Sin Lu	161382	Taw Kywe Lu	18.1099°N 95.3504°E	
Hpoe Soe Chaung	161380	Taw Kywe Lu	18.1116°N 95.3374°E	
Taw Kywe Lu	161378	Taw Kywe Lu	18.1166°N 95.3356°E	
Sa Khan Gyi	161381	Taw Kywe Lu	18.1061°N 95.3402°E	
Myay Zar Pyin	161383	Taw Kywe Lu	18.1067°N 95.3264°E	
Nyaung Waing	158641	Nyaung Waing		
Htone Waing Kone	158645	Nyaung Waing	18.0202°N 95.4323°E	
Ku Lar Kone	158646	Nyaung Waing	18.0248°N 95.4279°E	
Daung Kone	158647	Nyaung Waing	18.0286°N 95.4325°E	
Kyoet Taw	158642	Nyaung Waing	18.0075°N 95.4248°E	
Sin Kyun	158648	Nyaung Waing		
Zee Kone Kyun	158644	Nyaung Waing	18.0067°N 95.4404°E	
Thea Boet	158643	Nyaung Waing	18.0084°N 95.4199°E	
Kyun Kone	160380	Shwe Kyin		
Hpa Yar Gyi Kone	160378	Shwe Kyin	18.0404°N 95.4379°E	
Nga Bat Chaung	160376	Shwe Kyin	18.0607°N 95.4314°E	
Yae Twin Kone	160379	Shwe Kyin	18.0336°N 95.4385°E	
Hpa Yar Hla	160383	Shwe Kyin	18.0402°N 95.4419°E	
Daung Kone	160382	Shwe Kyin	18.0312°N 95.4331°E	
Kyu Taw Lay	160381	Shwe Kyin	18.0358°N 95.4309°E	
Shwe Kyin	160375	Shwe Kyin	18.0381°N 95.4374°E	
Nga Bat Chaung (East)	160377	Shwe Kyin	18.0442°N 95.4416°E	
Dat Kone	158270	Nga Pi Seik	18.1329°N 95.3897°E	
Nga Pi Seik	158269	Nga Pi Seik	18.1136°N 95.4075°E	
Zin Pyun Kone	158271	Nga Pi Seik	18.1261°N 95.3895°E	
Pu Zun Chaung	158272	Nga Pi Seik	18.1272°N 95.4005°E	
Nyaung Win	158273	Nga Pi Seik	18.1432°N 95.394°E	
Pan Tauk Kone	158274	Nga Pi Seik	18.1204°N 95.4009°E	
Kyauk Sa Yit Kone	161961	Tha Yet Taw	18.1023°N 95.4071°E	
Chaung Yoe Kone	161956	Tha Yet Taw	18.0727°N 95.4274°E	
Tha Yet Taw	161955	Tha Yet Taw	18.0858°N 95.4196°E	
Pauk Taw	161960	Tha Yet Taw	18.0984°N 95.414°E	
Yae Le	161959	Tha Yet Taw	18.0776°N 95.4241°E	
Inn Pet Let	161962	Tha Yet Taw	18.0941°N 95.4013°E	
Nga Bat Chaung	161958	Tha Yet Taw	18.066°N 95.4306°E	
Yin Taik Kone	161957	Tha Yet Taw	18.0887°N 95.4143°E	
Thit Seint Pin Kone	156163	Kyu Taw		
Aing Ma	156162	Kyu Taw	18.0097°N 95.4147°E	
Tha Yet Pin Se	156161	Kyu Taw	18.0271°N 95.4037°E	
Pyant Gyi Kone	156160	Kyu Taw	18.025°N 95.4189°E	
Ywar Thit Kone	156159	Kyu Taw	18.0276°N 95.4156°E	
Nyaung Htawt	156158	Kyu Taw	18.026°N 95.4096°E	
Kyu Taw	156157	Kyu Taw	18.0317°N 95.4217°E	
War Taw Chaung	163570	Yaik	18.0003°N 95.3878°E	
Yaik	163567	Yaik	18.0181°N 95.3876°E	
Tha Yet Taw	163569	Yaik	18.0055°N 95.3746°E	
Thin Chaung	163572	Yaik	18.0491°N 95.3854°E	
Hpet Win Kone	163571	Yaik	18.0368°N 95.3694°E	
Bwet Kone	163568	Yaik		
San Ta Khwe	158628	Nyaung Tone Le	18.0677°N 95.3692°E	
Pauk Kone	158626	Nyaung Tone Le		
Zan Kywe Auk Kyun	158625	Nyaung Tone Le	18.0904°N 95.3532°E	
Nyaungdon Le	158624	Nyaung Tone Le	18.0777°N 95.3586°E	
Zan Kywe Kone	158627	Nyaung Tone Le	18.0865°N 95.3472°E	
Shar Kone	151378	Daung Kya	18.0707°N 95.3552°E	
Ah Tha Lun	151380	Daung Kya	18.048°N 95.3711°E	
Kyaung Kone	151385	Daung Kya	18.0476°N 95.3543°E	
Zee Kone	151379	Daung Kya	18.0586°N 95.3724°E	
Daung Kya	151377	Daung Kya	18.0622°N 95.3581°E	
Ta Laing Chan	151383	Daung Kya	18.0408°N 95.345°E	
Ah Lel Su	151386	Daung Kya	18.0542°N 95.3732°E	
Kyoet Kone	151381	Daung Kya	18.049°N 95.359°E	
Nga Hpei Aing	151384	Daung Kya	18.0539°N 95.3807°E	
Kone Gyi	151382	Daung Kya	18.0428°N 95.3531°E	
Kyoet Chaung	161760	Tha Pyay Kone	17.9315°N 95.4037°E	
Hpa Yar Gyi Kone	161747	Tha Pyay Kone	17.9618°N 95.3979°E	
Shar Taw Su	161749	Tha Pyay Kone	17.9521°N 95.3972°E	
Inn Wa (North)	161762	Tha Pyay Kone	17.931°N 95.4074°E	
Thea Hpyu Kwin	161764	Tha Pyay Kone	17.9381°N 95.4004°E	
Ywar Thit Kone	161759	Tha Pyay Kone	17.9781°N 95.425°E	
Pyin Su	161758	Tha Pyay Kone	17.9689°N 95.428°E	
Khun Hnit Ein Tan	161757	Tha Pyay Kone	17.9612°N 95.4233°E	
Hnget Pyaw Taw	161756	Tha Pyay Kone	17.9708°N 95.4175°E	
Nga Pyay Ma	161755	Tha Pyay Kone	17.9925°N 95.4185°E	
Zee Hpyu Kwin	161753	Tha Pyay Kone		
Myauk Chaw Kone	161763	Tha Pyay Kone	17.9251°N 95.3846°E	
Tha Pyay Kone	161745	Tha Pyay Kone	17.9532°N 95.4091°E	
Nga Yant Taing	161746	Tha Pyay Kone	17.9627°N 95.3923°E	
Inn Kwei	161765	Tha Pyay Kone	17.9916°N 95.3818°E	
Nyaung Tay	161752	Tha Pyay Kone	17.9683°N 95.4039°E	
Nyaung Kone	161751	Tha Pyay Kone	17.9835°N 95.4135°E	
Khe Pyauk	161750	Tha Pyay Kone	17.9951°N 95.4105°E	
Seik Hpu Kone	161754	Tha Pyay Kone	17.9884°N 95.393°E	
Inn Wa (South)	161761	Tha Pyay Kone	17.9275°N 95.4079°E	
Tar Hnit Yar	161748	Tha Pyay Kone	17.9629°N 95.414°E	
Lan Dar Kone	159280	Pe Ta Khwe	17.9325°N 95.4282°E	
Pe Ta Khwe	159277	Pe Ta Khwe	17.9662°N 95.4312°E	
Wun Lo Thaik	159278	Pe Ta Khwe		
Sat Thwar Hpu Kyun (East)	159283	Pe Ta Khwe	17.9453°N 95.4196°E	
Lan Dar (West)	159282	Pe Ta Khwe	17.9379°N 95.4244°E	
Yae Lel Kyun	159281	Pe Ta Khwe		
Sat Thwar Hpu Kyun (West)	159279	Pe Ta Khwe	17.9432°N 95.4182°E	
Lan Dar (East)	159284	Pe Ta Khwe	17.9372°N 95.4316°E	
Me Khin Chaung	157432	Me Khin Chaung	17.9423°N 95.4793°E	
Nan Taw Kyun	157434	Me Khin Chaung	17.9629°N 95.472°E	
Me Khin Chaung Kwet Thit	157433	Me Khin Chaung		
Nyaung Tan	163874	Za Loke Gyi		
Za Loke Gyi	163873	Za Loke Gyi	17.9165°N 95.3814°E	
Oke Shit Kone	163876	Za Loke Gyi	17.9149°N 95.3724°E	
Pein Inn	163877	Za Loke Gyi	17.9314°N 95.3749°E	
Kant Ba Lu	163875	Za Loke Gyi	17.913°N 95.3891°E	
Yae Kyaw Chaung	163878	Za Loke Gyi	17.9114°N 95.3604°E	
Nat Yae Kan	162298	Thea Hpyu	17.9638°N 95.3562°E	
Kaw Kone	162299	Thea Hpyu	17.9966°N 95.3557°E	
Let U Sein	162297	Thea Hpyu	17.9799°N 95.3865°E	
Khat Ti Ya	162296	Thea Hpyu	17.99°N 95.3677°E	
Bwet Gyi	162295	Thea Hpyu	17.955°N 95.3523°E	
Sa Khan Gyi	162294	Thea Hpyu	17.9504°N 95.3571°E	
Moe Ma Kha	162293	Thea Hpyu	17.9555°N 95.3355°E	
Ma Gyi Oke	162292	Thea Hpyu	17.9601°N 95.3484°E	
Inn Pya Kone	162291	Thea Hpyu		
Ta Man Kone	162290	Thea Hpyu	17.957°N 95.378°E	
Yae Twin Kone	162285	Thea Hpyu	17.9809°N 95.359°E	
Nyaung Kone	162284	Thea Hpyu	17.9844°N 95.3722°E	
Tha Yet Kone	162300	Thea Hpyu	17.9454°N 95.3639°E	
Ta Nyin Kone	162288	Thea Hpyu	17.9727°N 95.3729°E	
Hpoe Lay Kone	162286	Thea Hpyu	17.9773°N 95.3897°E	
Nyaung Ta Gar	162287	Thea Hpyu		
Ywar Thit	162301	Thea Hpyu	17.9665°N 95.3469°E	
Thea Hpyu Auk Su	162283	Thea Hpyu	17.9416°N 95.3707°E	
Pa Toke	162289	Thea Hpyu		
Ah Nyar Su	163663	Yin Taik Kone	17.9389°N 95.329°E	
Yae Thoe	163664	Yin Taik Kone	17.9358°N 95.3353°E	
Kyoet Pin Su	163665	Yin Taik Kone	17.9337°N 95.3371°E	
Yin Taik Kone	163662	Yin Taik Kone	17.9402°N 95.3175°E	
U Yin Tan	163666	Yin Taik Kone	17.9432°N 95.3301°E	
Sin Pon	152693	Htauk Kyant	17.9578°N 95.3248°E	
Pan Doe	152692	Htauk Kyant	17.9644°N 95.3239°E	
Dee Doke Kone	152691	Htauk Kyant	17.9717°N 95.3294°E	
Ywar Thit Kone	152690	Htauk Kyant	17.9521°N 95.3179°E	
Htauk Kyant	152689	Htauk Kyant	17.9892°N 95.3336°E	
Chaung Hpyar	153557	Ka Nyut Kone	18.0377°N 95.3193°E	
Ohn Hne Kone	153554	Ka Nyut Kone	18.0131°N 95.3419°E	
Nyaung Kone	153556	Ka Nyut Kone	18.0226°N 95.3079°E	
Taw Zar Kone	153555	Ka Nyut Kone	18.0014°N 95.3371°E	
Chaung Gwa	153552	Ka Nyut Kone	18.0192°N 95.3071°E	
Ah Yoe Kone	153551	Ka Nyut Kone	18.0111°N 95.319°E	
Ka Nyut Kone	153550	Ka Nyut Kone	18.0105°N 95.3308°E	
Ohn Kone	153558	Ka Nyut Kone	18.0157°N 95.31°E	
Kya Khat	153553	Ka Nyut Kone	18.0204°N 95.3127°E	
Ah Sei (South)	150260	Ah Sei	17.9885°N 95.3464°E	
Ywar Thit	150269	Ah Sei	18.0177°N 95.3682°E	
Thar Yar Kone	150267	Ah Sei	18.002°N 95.3797°E	
Khat Ti Ya	150268	Ah Sei	17.989°N 95.3675°E	
Sar Hpyu Su	150262	Ah Sei	18.0077°N 95.3546°E	
Oe Lel Pin	150261	Ah Sei	18.0138°N 95.3624°E	
Kaw Kone	150265	Ah Sei	18.003°N 95.3617°E	
War Taw Chaung	150266	Ah Sei	18.003°N 95.3831°E	
Ah Sei (North)	150259	Ah Sei	18.0008°N 95.3504°E	
Me Zin	150264	Ah Sei	18.0184°N 95.3792°E	
Min Kha Lon	150263	Ah Sei	18.0035°N 95.3513°E	
Gon Min	152176	Hnget Gyi Kwin	18.0844°N 95.1725°E	
Pauk Aing	152175	Hnget Gyi Kwin	18.1034°N 95.1819°E	
Myay Pyar	152178	Hnget Gyi Kwin	18.1261°N 95.1896°E	
Tha Yet Kone	152172	Hnget Gyi Kwin	18.1305°N 95.1901°E	
Shwe Tha Min Kwin	152174	Hnget Gyi Kwin	18.1131°N 95.167°E	
Hnget Gyi Kwin	152171	Hnget Gyi Kwin	18.0916°N 95.1883°E	
Hman Tan	152173	Hnget Gyi Kwin	18.1149°N 95.1871°E	
Myay Pyar Ah Shey Kone	152177	Hnget Gyi Kwin	18.1279°N 95.1921°E	
Ma Gyi Kone (Myauk Su)	157105	Ma Gyi Kone	18.079°N 95.1931°E	
Tha Pyu Sein	157104	Ma Gyi Kone	18.0578°N 95.2047°E	
Ma Gyi Kone (Taung Su)	157103	Ma Gyi Kone	18.0701°N 95.1968°E	
Sar Ni Su	156887	Let Pan Kwin	18.0604°N 95.1522°E	
Nyaung Gyi Paung	156889	Let Pan Kwin	18.0443°N 95.1452°E	
Ma Gyi Oke	156888	Let Pan Kwin	18.0509°N 95.1662°E	
Let Pan Kwin	156885	Let Pan Kwin	18.0562°N 95.1645°E	
Kyun Taw Kone	156886	Let Pan Kwin	18.0604°N 95.1645°E	
Oke Pon	156890	Let Pan Kwin	18.0571°N 95.1445°E	
Nat Taung	162236	Thea Boet	18.1698°N 95.1629°E	
Chin Kwin	162237	Thea Boet	18.1556°N 95.1709°E	
Thea Boet	162235	Thea Boet	18.1529°N 95.1763°E	
Htein Thay Kone	162238	Thea Boet	18.1323°N 95.1731°E	
Kan Peit	158190	Nga Bat Kya	18.0798°N 95.1397°E	
Ni Pa Say Kone	158191	Nga Bat Kya	18.0769°N 95.1643°E	
Thet Nge Kone	158192	Nga Bat Kya	18.0675°N 95.1382°E	
Htone Bo	158193	Nga Bat Kya	18.0594°N 95.1362°E	
Oke Pon	158194	Nga Bat Kya	18.0593°N 95.1432°E	
Kyaung Kwin Chin Su	158195	Nga Bat Kya	18.07°N 95.1502°E	
Toke Kwin	158189	Nga Bat Kya	18.0642°N 95.1212°E	
Nga Bat Kya	158188	Nga Bat Kya	18.0707°N 95.146°E	
Lu Gyi Kone	158442	Nyaung Chin	18.0303°N 95.2169°E	
Kauk Ka Lauk Sein	158441	Nyaung Chin	18.0254°N 95.1976°E	
Oke Shit Taung	158440	Nyaung Chin	18.0214°N 95.1878°E	
Ba Lan Sein	158439	Nyaung Chin	18.0238°N 95.2341°E	
Yin Taw	158438	Nyaung Chin	18.0268°N 95.2292°E	
Nyaung Chin	158437	Nyaung Chin	18.0122°N 95.1909°E	
Htein Thay Ka Lay	152796	Htein Thay Gyi	18.0266°N 95.1663°E	
Shan Kwin	152795	Htein Thay Gyi	18.041°N 95.163°E	
Htein Thay Gyi	152794	Htein Thay Gyi	18.0222°N 95.1749°E	
Taung Pat Lel	152797	Htein Thay Gyi	18.0387°N 95.155°E	
Hpan Khar Kone	157360	Ma Yway Kone	18.0526°N 95.1767°E	
Kone Ma Gyi	157364	Ma Yway Kone	18.0553°N 95.1812°E	
Shan Taw	157363	Ma Yway Kone	18.0384°N 95.2113°E	
Gway Gaung Gon	157361	Ma Yway Kone	18.049°N 95.1927°E	
Ywar Thit Kone	157359	Ma Yway Kone	18.056°N 95.1761°E	
Ma Yway Kone	157358	Ma Yway Kone	18.0452°N 95.181°E	
Nyaung Ywar Nge	157362	Ma Yway Kone	18.0466°N 95.1958°E	
Kyein Paik	150738	Bant Bway Kone	17.9751°N 95.1393°E	
Bant Bway Kone	150726	Bant Bway Kone	17.978°N 95.1221°E	
Ywar Thit	150727	Bant Bway Kone	17.9842°N 95.1012°E	
Gyeik Taw	150728	Bant Bway Kone	17.9818°N 95.1053°E	
Yae Tar	150729	Bant Bway Kone	17.9756°N 95.1272°E	
Tat Kone	150730	Bant Bway Kone	17.9884°N 95.0976°E	
Yae Hpyu San	150731	Bant Bway Kone	17.9878°N 95.14°E	
Htauk Kyant Kaing	150732	Bant Bway Kone	17.9775°N 95.1463°E	
Ah Lel	150733	Bant Bway Kone	17.9768°N 95.1421°E	
Hpa Yar Hpyu	150734	Bant Bway Kone	17.9744°N 95.1516°E	
Tha Nat Pin Kwin	150735	Bant Bway Kone	17.9612°N 95.1562°E	
Sein Gyi	150737	Bant Bway Kone	17.9766°N 95.165°E	
Sein Kone	150739	Bant Bway Kone	17.992°N 95.1464°E	
Sein Kwin	150740	Bant Bway Kone	17.9881°N 95.1541°E	
Mi Chaung Aing	150736	Bant Bway Kone	17.9557°N 95.1613°E	
Yaw Kwin	159864	San Ywar Gyi	18.0215°N 95.1522°E	
Le Khon Gyi	159858	San Ywar Gyi	18.0184°N 95.136°E	
Le Khon Lay	159859	San Ywar Gyi	18.0194°N 95.1401°E	
Nyaung Chay Htauk (Upper)	159860	San Ywar Gyi	18.031°N 95.1185°E	
Nyaung Chay Htauk (Lower)	159861	San Ywar Gyi	18.0313°N 95.127°E	
U Yin Kwin	159863	San Ywar Gyi	18.0275°N 95.1033°E	
San Ywar Gyi	159857	San Ywar Gyi	18.0326°N 95.101°E	
Tha Pyay Kone	159862	San Ywar Gyi	18.0306°N 95.0975°E	
Nyaung Khon	157899	Myin War Taung	18.0871°N 95.1265°E	
Myin War Taung	157897	Myin War Taung	18.0974°N 95.0973°E	
Win Ka Bar	157898	Myin War Taung	18.0917°N 95.1216°E	
