= List of villages in Ingapu Township =

This is a list of villages in Ingapu Township, Hinthada District, Ayeyarwady Region, Burma (Myanmar).

Village	Village code	Village tract	Coordinates (links to map & photo sources)	Notes
Myan Aung Su	154006	Kan U	17.8352°N 95.2639°E	
Zay Ya	154007	Kan U		
Kan U	154004	Kan U	17.845°N 95.2538°E	
Thone Set	154005	Kan U	17.831°N 95.2697°E	
Lel Di	160167	Shan Gaung Byea	17.8443°N 95.2833°E	
Pa Dat Kone	160179	Shan Gaung Byea	17.827°N 95.2993°E	
Wet Thay	160178	Shan Gaung Byea	17.8116°N 95.2889°E	
Shwe Nyaung Pin (West)	160177	Shan Gaung Byea	17.8282°N 95.2796°E	
Wun Thaik	160174	Shan Gaung Byea	17.8351°N 95.3216°E	
Ka Na So	160163	Shan Gaung Byea	17.8476°N 95.313°E	
Shan Taw	160164	Shan Gaung Byea		
Shwe Nyaung Pin (East)	160172	Shan Gaung Byea	17.8248°N 95.2865°E	
Oke Shit Kone	160166	Shan Gaung Byea	17.8121°N 95.3156°E	
Yae Hpyin Chaung	160175	Shan Gaung Byea	17.8421°N 95.3037°E	
Kan Kone	160168	Shan Gaung Byea	17.8503°N 95.2939°E	
Sin Pon	160169	Shan Gaung Byea	17.8059°N 95.3098°E	
Yoe Lay Wa	160170	Shan Gaung Byea	17.8154°N 95.2821°E	
Shan Gaung Byea	160162	Shan Gaung Byea	17.8291°N 95.2823°E	
Tha Yaw Pin	160173	Shan Gaung Byea	17.8533°N 95.3043°E	
Yae Kyaw	160171	Shan Gaung Byea	17.8212°N 95.2867°E	
Shan Gaung Byea (West)	160176	Shan Gaung Byea	17.8328°N 95.2767°E	
Yae Kyaw (East)	160165	Shan Gaung Byea	17.82°N 95.2898°E	
Thaik Tu Kwin	150553	Auk Ywar Gyi	17.7884°N 95.2574°E	
Kyoet Kone	150552	Auk Ywar Gyi	17.7921°N 95.264°E	
Me Za Li Su	150551	Auk Ywar Gyi	17.7994°N 95.2668°E	
Shan Taw	150550	Auk Ywar Gyi	17.7879°N 95.2707°E	
Auk Ywar Gyi	150549	Auk Ywar Gyi	17.7947°N 95.2676°E	
Moe Khaung Kwin	162481	Thet Kei Pyin	17.9044°N 95.2589°E	
Daunt Gyi	162479	Thet Kei Pyin	17.8888°N 95.2542°E	
Nwar Chan Kone	162480	Thet Kei Pyin	17.8836°N 95.2534°E	
Thet Kei Pyin (East)	162478	Thet Kei Pyin	17.8922°N 95.2502°E	
Kyaung Kone	162489	Thet Kei Pyin		
Kyun Taw Kone	162493	Thet Kei Pyin		
Inn Kauk Ka Lay	162482	Thet Kei Pyin	17.9012°N 95.2539°E	
Thin Zar Li	162492	Thet Kei Pyin		
Inn Pat Lat	162490	Thet Kei Pyin	17.8967°N 95.2531°E	
Thet Kei Pyin (West)	162494	Thet Kei Pyin	17.8928°N 95.2428°E	
Pyin Taung Kwin	162488	Thet Kei Pyin	17.9021°N 95.2426°E	
Shwe Taung Tan	162487	Thet Kei Pyin		
Ywar Thit Kone	162486	Thet Kei Pyin	17.8937°N 95.257°E	
Lay Ein Tan	162485	Thet Kei Pyin		
Chan Gyi Te	162484	Thet Kei Pyin	17.897°N 95.2365°E	
Nyaung Thone Pin	162483	Thet Kei Pyin	17.8955°N 95.2676°E	
Gaw Par So Tay	162491	Thet Kei Pyin	17.8994°N 95.2619°E	
Tha Hpan Pin	158136	Nauk Mee		
Yae Kyaw	158139	Nauk Mee	17.8024°N 95.343°E	
Kan Nar Tan	158140	Nauk Mee	17.8106°N 95.3616°E	
Ma Gyi Su	158138	Nauk Mee	17.8256°N 95.3486°E	
Kyoet Kone Lay	158141	Nauk Mee	17.8387°N 95.3583°E	
Nauk Mee	158135	Nauk Mee	17.8062°N 95.3518°E	
Ta Kei Thu Lay	158137	Nauk Mee	17.8264°N 95.3386°E	
Zee Hpyu Kwin (West)	163189	Wet Thay	17.7927°N 95.3046°E	
Wet Thay	163186	Wet Thay	17.8066°N 95.2981°E	
Zee Hpyu Kwin (East)	163187	Wet Thay	17.7936°N 95.3077°E	
Set Set Yo	163188	Wet Thay		
Aye Zay Di	163190	Wet Thay		
Yae Kyaw	163191	Wet Thay	17.8155°N 95.2876°E	
Sin Pon	163192	Wet Thay	17.8052°N 95.3118°E	
Taung Sein (West)	157951	Myit Tar Kone	17.8667°N 95.2149°E	
Ohn Ta Pin	157947	Myit Tar Kone		
Kyaung Su	157957	Myit Tar Kone	17.849°N 95.24°E	
Tar Kant Lant	157956	Myit Tar Kone		
Myit Tar Kone	157945	Myit Tar Kone	17.8476°N 95.2373°E	
Oke Kan	157948	Myit Tar Kone	17.8774°N 95.2252°E	
Bar Thar Kone	157954	Myit Tar Kone		
Taung Sein (East)	157949	Myit Tar Kone	17.8691°N 95.2192°E	
Thone Ein Tan	157955	Myit Tar Kone	17.8461°N 95.2351°E	
Gone Su	157953	Myit Tar Kone	17.8578°N 95.2244°E	
Kun Yar Lay	157952	Myit Tar Kone	17.862°N 95.2241°E	
Ka Zin Gyi	157950	Myit Tar Kone	17.8507°N 95.2327°E	
Kun Yar Gyi	157946	Myit Tar Kone	17.8575°N 95.2192°E	
Kwin Hla	159113	Pan Tin	17.8561°N 95.2842°E	
Kan Se	159114	Pan Tin	17.8486°N 95.244°E	
Kun Thee Taw	159115	Pan Tin		
Pan Tin	159112	Pan Tin	17.8386°N 95.2715°E	
Yae Le Ah Htet Su	159116	Pan Tin	17.875°N 95.2603°E	
Ah Choke Gyi Kone	159119	Pan Tin		
Thin Man Kone	159118	Pan Tin	17.8628°N 95.2809°E	
Pyin Htaung	159120	Pan Tin	17.8631°N 95.2705°E	
Yoe Gyi Kone	159121	Pan Tin	17.8751°N 95.2455°E	
Yae Le Auk Su	159117	Pan Tin	17.8708°N 95.2589°E	
Tha Yet Taw	152378	Hpa Yar Kwin	17.8549°N 95.2375°E	
Yone Zin	152379	Hpa Yar Kwin	17.8903°N 95.2425°E	
Lu Gyi	152377	Hpa Yar Kwin	17.8688°N 95.2392°E	
Moke Khar	152380	Hpa Yar Kwin	17.8747°N 95.2417°E	
Zaung Tan	152381	Hpa Yar Kwin	17.852°N 95.2364°E	
Shan Taw	152382	Hpa Yar Kwin	17.8594°N 95.2373°E	
Hpa Yar Kwin	152376	Hpa Yar Kwin	17.8801°N 95.2464°E	
Htan Taw Su	152669	Htan Taw Su	17.8323°N 95.2442°E	
Kayin Kwin	152670	Htan Taw Su	17.8391°N 95.2366°E	
Ywar Haung Kone	152671	Htan Taw Su	17.8323°N 95.2405°E	
Pyan Chi Hla	152673	Htan Taw Su	17.8328°N 95.2353°E	
Ywar Thit Kone	152672	Htan Taw Su	17.8361°N 95.2419°E	
Su Pa Daung Kwin	157490	Me Za Li Kone	17.9025°N 95.2072°E	
Kyan Taw	157479	Me Za Li Kone	17.905°N 95.2305°E	
Let Pan Khon	157484	Me Za Li Kone	17.8964°N 95.2233°E	
Ohn Kone	157483	Me Za Li Kone	17.8896°N 95.2236°E	
Kyun Kone	157482	Me Za Li Kone	17.915°N 95.2449°E	
Kan Daunt	157481	Me Za Li Kone	17.9025°N 95.2357°E	
Hlay Gyi Aing	157480	Me Za Li Kone	17.9049°N 95.222°E	
Me Za Li Kone	157478	Me Za Li Kone	17.8958°N 95.2277°E	
Kaing Taw Kwin	157485	Me Za Li Kone	17.8938°N 95.2175°E	
Yae Thoe	157486	Me Za Li Kone	17.8996°N 95.2197°E	
Kyaung Daunt	157487	Me Za Li Kone	17.9078°N 95.2251°E	
Pyay Taw Thar	157489	Me Za Li Kone	17.9037°N 95.2193°E	
Kan Gyi	157488	Me Za Li Kone	17.9027°N 95.226°E	
Lel Gyi Kwin	156781	Lel Gyi Kwin	17.9145°N 95.1967°E	
San Ywar Kwin	156786	Lel Gyi Kwin	17.9306°N 95.1905°E	
Su Pa Daung Kwin	156785	Lel Gyi Kwin	17.9038°N 95.2071°E	
Kyun Pin Seik	156784	Lel Gyi Kwin	17.9114°N 95.212°E	
Shar Hpyu Pin Seik	156783	Lel Gyi Kwin	17.9202°N 95.2045°E	
Aing Ka Law	156782	Lel Gyi Kwin	17.929°N 95.1994°E	
Nyaung Kone	162498	Thet Kei Pyin (Than Ba Yar Taing)	17.8047°N 95.3337°E	
Inn Hlyar Gyi	162499	Thet Kei Pyin (Than Ba Yar Taing)	17.8092°N 95.3323°E	
Tar Gyi Tan	162497	Thet Kei Pyin (Than Ba Yar Taing)		
Ka Nyin Yoe	162496	Thet Kei Pyin (Than Ba Yar Taing)	17.7945°N 95.3347°E	
Thet Kei Pyin	162495	Thet Kei Pyin (Than Ba Yar Taing)	17.7827°N 95.3178°E	
Kant Gaw Kwin	154176	Kayin Ku	17.9044°N 95.2623°E	
Kayin Ku Gyi	154171	Kayin Ku	17.9167°N 95.2641°E	
Kayin Ku Lay	154172	Kayin Ku	17.9097°N 95.259°E	
Myay Zar Inn	154173	Kayin Ku	17.92°N 95.2546°E	
Doe Kone	154174	Kayin Ku	17.8998°N 95.2764°E	
Kan Doke	154175	Kayin Ku	17.8981°N 95.2701°E	
Kyee Taw Kone	152981	In Pin Kone	17.87°N 95.295°E	
Wet That Kone	152980	In Pin Kone	17.8832°N 95.2835°E	
Kyar Thay	152976	In Pin Kone	17.9055°N 95.2896°E	
Nga Hpei Htu (Middle)	152990	In Pin Kone	17.8891°N 95.2904°E	
Kan Doke	152985	In Pin Kone		
In Pin Kone (Sar Hp yu Su)	152982	In Pin Kone	17.941°N 95.3423°E	
Sin Thay	152977	In Pin Kone	17.9005°N 95.304°E	
In Pin Kone	152975	In Pin Kone	17.89°N 95.2846°E	
Ohn Taw Su	152979	In Pin Kone	17.9052°N 95.2964°E	
Doe Kone (Baw Li)	152986	In Pin Kone		
Chin Kone	152988	In Pin Kone	17.8835°N 95.2787°E	
Thar Yar Kone	152987	In Pin Kone		
Kun Chan Kone	152978	In Pin Kone	17.8956°N 95.2902°E	
Nga Hpei Htu (South)	152983	In Pin Kone	17.8842°N 95.2898°E	
Inn Win Kone	152984	In Pin Kone	17.8711°N 95.3005°E	
Myit Poke Kone	152992	In Pin Kone		
In Pin Kone (Kyaung Kone)	152993	In Pin Kone	17.8884°N 95.2835°E	
Nga Hpei Htu (North)	152989	In Pin Kone	17.8945°N 95.2938°E	
Doe Kone	152991	In Pin Kone	17.9022°N 95.2847°E	
Taung Poet Gyi Chaung	151210	Chin Chaung	17.9418°N 95.2244°E	
San Twin Chaung	151213	Chin Chaung	17.9304°N 95.2352°E	
Kone Zong	151214	Chin Chaung	17.9257°N 95.2384°E	
Ma Taunt Ta	151208	Chin Chaung	17.9143°N 95.2226°E	
Mek Tha Lin Kwin	151211	Chin Chaung	17.9342°N 95.2179°E	
Chin Chaung	151207	Chin Chaung	17.9147°N 95.235°E	
Ma Gyi Kone	151209	Chin Chaung	17.9218°N 95.2158°E	
Taung Paw Kone	151212	Chin Chaung	17.9282°N 95.2399°E	
Kant Lant Kone	157532	Mee Laung Kone	17.871°N 95.1972°E	
Za Yat Kone	157526	Mee Laung Kone	17.89°N 95.2134°E	
Zee Kone	157528	Mee Laung Kone	17.8839°N 95.2214°E	
Yae Kyat	157529	Mee Laung Kone	17.8831°N 95.1901°E	
Yae Twin Kone	157530	Mee Laung Kone	17.878°N 95.2127°E	
Ma Gyi Chaung	157531	Mee Laung Kone	17.8786°N 95.198°E	
Chin Kone	157534	Mee Laung Kone	17.8801°N 95.1912°E	
Ah Lel Su	157527	Mee Laung Kone	17.8825°N 95.2119°E	
Chin Twin	157533	Mee Laung Kone	17.887°N 95.2036°E	
Myauk Chin Kwin	156660	Lay Gyi	17.8914°N 95.2064°E	
Lay Gyi	156657	Lay Gyi	17.8939°N 95.1914°E	
Pan Hla Kwin	156659	Lay Gyi	17.9009°N 95.1699°E	
Su Pa Daung Kwin	156661	Lay Gyi	17.9036°N 95.2061°E	
Myauk Kone	156662	Lay Gyi	17.902°N 95.1947°E	
Gon Min Hmyaung	156658	Lay Gyi	17.9097°N 95.1798°E	
Ma Au Kone	161476	Tha Bawt	17.8846°N 95.1861°E	
Yae Kyat	161478	Tha Bawt	17.8825°N 95.1889°E	
Tha Bawt	161475	Tha Bawt	17.8635°N 95.1861°E	
Pan Hla Kwin	161477	Tha Bawt	17.8951°N 95.1661°E	
Ah Nauk Kone Gyi	153480	Ka Nyin Ngu	17.8197°N 95.1641°E	
Kyar Inn Yoe	153477	Ka Nyin Ngu	17.8313°N 95.1771°E	
Kyoet Kone Lay	153479	Ka Nyin Ngu	17.8251°N 95.1679°E	
Kyoet Kone	153476	Ka Nyin Ngu	17.825°N 95.1714°E	
Ma Gyi Pin Kwin	153475	Ka Nyin Ngu	17.8381°N 95.1708°E	
Than Ba Yar Kwin	153474	Ka Nyin Ngu	17.8326°N 95.165°E	
Ka Nyin Ngu	153472	Ka Nyin Ngu	17.8449°N 95.1752°E	
Ah Shey Kone Gyi	153473	Ka Nyin Ngu	17.8231°N 95.1616°E	
Thit Yar Chaung	153478	Ka Nyin Ngu	17.8589°N 95.1597°E	
Zee Hpyu Kone	159465	Put Kone	17.8614°N 95.1983°E	
Myay Ye Kwin	159471	Put Kone	17.8538°N 95.1963°E	
Gon Nyin Tan (East)	159469	Put Kone	17.8515°N 95.2164°E	
Let Pan Kone	159472	Put Kone	17.8676°N 95.1997°E	
Boet Kone	159466	Put Kone	17.8429°N 95.1963°E	
Sein	159467	Put Kone	17.8407°N 95.1948°E	
Pyin Htaung Kwin	159468	Put Kone	17.8401°N 95.2037°E	
Gon Nyin Kone (West)	159473	Put Kone	17.853°N 95.211°E	
Oke Twin	159464	Put Kone	17.859°N 95.2058°E	
Put Kone	159463	Put Kone	17.8472°N 95.1933°E	
Nyaung Kone	159470	Put Kone	17.8446°N 95.1948°E	
Htu Gyi	152896	Htu Gyi	17.972°N 95.2609°E	
Shwe Pyay Su	152902	Htu Gyi	18.0062°N 95.2381°E	
Tha Man Chaung	152904	Htu Gyi		
Kwin Yar	152897	Htu Gyi		
Gon Nyin Tan	152898	Htu Gyi	18.0012°N 95.2456°E	
Kyeik Taw	152899	Htu Gyi	17.9829°N 95.274°E	
Kyee Pin San Ma	152905	Htu Gyi		
Kyein Kyon	152903	Htu Gyi	17.989°N 95.2401°E	
Ah Lel Su	152900	Htu Gyi	17.9776°N 95.2782°E	
Ywar Thar Yar	152901	Htu Gyi	17.998°N 95.2344°E	
Ka Paing (North)	158851	Oke Shit Kone	17.9488°N 95.2523°E	
Oke Shit Kone	158846	Oke Shit Kone	17.947°N 95.2476°E	
Kyet Gaung	158847	Oke Shit Kone	17.9547°N 95.2405°E	
Ma Yin Kone	158848	Oke Shit Kone		
Nyaung Kone	158849	Oke Shit Kone	17.9527°N 95.2585°E	
Ka Paing (South)	158850	Oke Shit Kone	17.9437°N 95.2518°E	
Kyaung Kone	155366	Kyaung Kone	17.9536°N 95.2663°E	
Ywar Thit Kone	155368	Kyaung Kone	17.9629°N 95.2629°E	
Nyaung Kone	155367	Kyaung Kone	17.9486°N 95.2603°E	
Tat Su	158886	Oke Twin	17.9347°N 95.2849°E	
Oke Twin	158884	Oke Twin	17.9428°N 95.2732°E	
Tha Yet Taw	158885	Oke Twin	17.9413°N 95.2784°E	
Ah Lel Su	158887	Oke Twin	17.9382°N 95.2768°E	
Ohn Kone Gyi	163007	War Net Taw	17.9682°N 95.2856°E	
Myit Ka Laing	163008	War Net Taw	17.967°N 95.3043°E	
Sin Gaung Inn	163009	War Net Taw	17.9808°N 95.2941°E	
Koke Ko Su	163010	War Net Taw	17.9691°N 95.2818°E	
Ohn Kone Lay	163011	War Net Taw	17.9651°N 95.2893°E	
Ah Shey Su	163005	War Net Taw	17.9758°N 95.2866°E	
Thin Man Chaung	163004	War Net Taw	17.9645°N 95.2791°E	
Par Li Kwin	163006	War Net Taw	17.9652°N 95.2985°E	
Tha Yet Taw	163003	War Net Taw	17.9746°N 95.2943°E	
War Net Taw	163002	War Net Taw	17.97°N 95.2958°E	
Thit Hpyu Kwin	157170	Ma Hpe Kwin	17.948°N 95.2949°E	
Yoe Da Yar	157174	Ma Hpe Kwin	17.9511°N 95.3027°E	
Be Kone	157173	Ma Hpe Kwin		
Myauk Su	157171	Ma Hpe Kwin	17.9578°N 95.2901°E	
Ohn Kone	157169	Ma Hpe Kwin	17.9609°N 95.2867°E	
Pauk Kone	157168	Ma Hpe Kwin	17.9558°N 95.2967°E	
Thin Man Chaung	157167	Ma Hpe Kwin	17.962°N 95.2803°E	
Ma Hpe Kwin	157166	Ma Hpe Kwin	17.9528°N 95.2907°E	
U Yin Su	157172	Ma Hpe Kwin	17.9503°N 95.2962°E	
Zee Kone	158538	Nyaung Pin Gyi Kwin	18.0042°N 95.2799°E	
Nyaung	158537	Nyaung Pin Gyi Kwin		
Let Pan Khon	158543	Nyaung Pin Gyi Kwin	18.019°N 95.2942°E	
Bant Bway Kone	158539	Nyaung Pin Gyi Kwin	18.0032°N 95.2891°E	
Nyaung Pin Gyi Kwin	158536	Nyaung Pin Gyi Kwin	18.0074°N 95.2927°E	
Kyun Pu Lu	158544	Nyaung Pin Gyi Kwin	18.0244°N 95.2871°E	
Ma Gyi Pin Seik	158541	Nyaung Pin Gyi Kwin	18.0161°N 95.288°E	
Shan Taw (Hpa Yar Chaung)	158547	Nyaung Pin Gyi Kwin		
Tit Ti Tu Kwin	158546	Nyaung Pin Gyi Kwin		
Shan Taw	158545	Nyaung Pin Gyi Kwin	18.0187°N 95.2866°E	
Yone Chaung	158548	Nyaung Pin Gyi Kwin	18.0217°N 95.2782°E	
Kyauk Saung	158542	Nyaung Pin Gyi Kwin	18.0351°N 95.291°E	
Gon Min Kwin	158540	Nyaung Pin Gyi Kwin	18.0107°N 95.2826°E	
Hpyauk Seik Kone	158549	Nyaung Pin Gyi Kwin	18.0166°N 95.278°E	
Chin Chaung	158550	Nyaung Pin Gyi Kwin	18.012°N 95.2896°E	
Htauk Kyant Kwin	151099	Chaung Gwa		
Ka Nyut Kone	151098	Chaung Gwa	18.0087°N 95.3283°E	
Taw Zar Kone	151100	Chaung Gwa	18.0013°N 95.3357°E	
Ma Yoe Kone	151101	Chaung Gwa		
Nyaung Kone	151102	Chaung Gwa	18.0264°N 95.3033°E	
Chaung Gwa	151096	Chaung Gwa	18.0167°N 95.3045°E	
Ah Yoe Taung Kone	151097	Chaung Gwa	18.0117°N 95.3108°E	
Thu Gyi Su	162808	Tit Ti Tu Kwin	17.9895°N 95.2833°E	
Shan Taw	162816	Tit Ti Tu Kwin		
Kaing Taw Kwin	162810	Tit Ti Tu Kwin	17.9976°N 95.2721°E	
Htu Gyi Lay	162811	Tit Ti Tu Kwin	17.9907°N 95.2625°E	
Tit Ti Tu Kwin	162807	Tit Ti Tu Kwin	17.9941°N 95.2918°E	
Nga Pyay Ma (South)	162809	Tit Ti Tu Kwin	17.9905°N 95.3039°E	
Zee Kone	162815	Tit Ti Tu Kwin	18.0015°N 95.2772°E	
Lel Gyi Kwin	162812	Tit Ti Tu Kwin	17.9912°N 95.2742°E	
Ywar Thit Kone	162813	Tit Ti Tu Kwin	17.9974°N 95.2826°E	
Nyaung	162814	Tit Ti Tu Kwin		
Nga Pyay Ma (North)	162817	Tit Ti Tu Kwin	17.9983°N 95.305°E	
Mandalay Kone	152393	Hpa Yar Ngoke To	18.0158°N 95.2631°E	
Hpa Yar Ngoke To	152383	Hpa Yar Ngoke To	18.019°N 95.2679°E	
Thit Hpyu Chaung	152384	Hpa Yar Ngoke To	18.0248°N 95.2712°E	
Lay Ein Tan	152385	Hpa Yar Ngoke To	18.0069°N 95.2747°E	
Than Pu Yar Kwin Gyi	152386	Hpa Yar Ngoke To	18.0258°N 95.2594°E	
Tha Pyay Kwin	152387	Hpa Yar Ngoke To	18.0237°N 95.2533°E	
Inn Tha Hnoke	152388	Hpa Yar Ngoke To	18.0182°N 95.2583°E	
Taung Ni	152389	Hpa Yar Ngoke To	18.0051°N 95.2477°E	
Kyee Pin Inn	152390	Hpa Yar Ngoke To	18.005°N 95.2562°E	
Paw Taw Mu	152392	Hpa Yar Ngoke To	18.0155°N 95.2529°E	
Than Pu Yar Kwin Lay	152394	Hpa Yar Ngoke To	18.0264°N 95.2629°E	
Sar Ni Su	152395	Hpa Yar Ngoke To	18.0114°N 95.2651°E	
Taung Paw Kone	152391	Hpa Yar Ngoke To	18.0129°N 95.258°E	
Kin Chaung	152914	Htu Wa	17.9592°N 95.2189°E	
Ah Lel Su	152912	Htu Wa	17.9557°N 95.2267°E	
Wun Lo Kone	152915	Htu Wa	17.9521°N 95.2201°E	
Htu Wa	152911	Htu Wa	17.9573°N 95.2342°E	
Ta Dar U	152913	Htu Wa	17.9504°N 95.2211°E	
Yin Shey	156718	Leik Paung Swea	17.9691°N 95.1474°E	
Moe Tein Myin	156725	Leik Paung Swea	17.943°N 95.1504°E	
Leik Paung Swea	156714	Leik Paung Swea	17.9552°N 95.1558°E	
Tha Yet Taw	156715	Leik Paung Swea	17.9502°N 95.1611°E	
Nat Sin Kone	156717	Leik Paung Swea	17.9461°N 95.1728°E	
Kan Kone	156719	Leik Paung Swea	17.9665°N 95.1368°E	
Kyan Khin Su	156720	Leik Paung Swea	17.9595°N 95.1441°E	
Let Ma Kone	156721	Leik Paung Swea	17.9503°N 95.139°E	
Ah Lel Su	156722	Leik Paung Swea	17.9429°N 95.16°E	
Nat Kan	156723	Leik Paung Swea	17.9312°N 95.1618°E	
U Yin Su	156724	Leik Paung Swea	17.9728°N 95.1444°E	
Htone Wa	156716	Leik Paung Swea	17.9506°N 95.1642°E	
Tha Pyay Pin	161786	Tha Pyay Pin	17.9334°N 95.1977°E	
Wea Gyi	161789	Tha Pyay Pin	17.949°N 95.174°E	
Poe Zar Taw	161788	Tha Pyay Pin	17.9461°N 95.1849°E	
Kan Bar Gyi	161787	Tha Pyay Pin	17.9368°N 95.1909°E	
Nyan Taw	156465	Kywe Zin	17.9738°N 95.1096°E	
Hnget Pyaw Taw	156464	Kywe Zin	17.9715°N 95.1197°E	
Kwin Kauk Wa	156463	Kywe Zin	17.9756°N 95.0996°E	
Kywe Zin	156462	Kywe Zin	17.9749°N 95.1037°E	
Ohn Khon	156466	Kywe Zin	17.9815°N 95.0954°E	
Kan Kone	156467	Kywe Zin	17.9658°N 95.1334°E	
Nyaung Pin Thar (East)	158477	Nyaung Kyoe	17.8673°N 95.4254°E	
Nyaung Pin Thar (West)	158476	Nyaung Kyoe	17.866°N 95.4159°E	
Let Kyar	158473	Nyaung Kyoe	17.8475°N 95.4251°E	
Hnget Tha Aw	158475	Nyaung Kyoe	17.8627°N 95.4277°E	
Pan Doe	158472	Nyaung Kyoe	17.874°N 95.4117°E	
Nyaung Kyoe	158471	Nyaung Kyoe	17.8551°N 95.4263°E	
Nyaungdon Le	158474	Nyaung Kyoe	17.8616°N 95.4106°E	
Nyaung Pin	157016	Lu Taw Su	17.8424°N 95.4208°E	
Shan	157015	Lu Taw Su	17.8363°N 95.414°E	
Ah Myaing	157014	Lu Taw Su	17.8351°N 95.3888°E	
Htein Kone	157013	Lu Taw Su	17.8332°N 95.3949°E	
Lu Taw Su	157012	Lu Taw Su	17.8298°N 95.4059°E	
That Da Ma Kyun	160659	Sit Kone	17.8571°N 95.4573°E	
Kyun Gyi	160658	Sit Kone	17.8503°N 95.4689°E	
Say Tauk Chaung	160660	Sit Kone		
Ah Shey Kone	160661	Sit Kone		
Nyaung Ni Kone	160657	Sit Kone		
Yoe Yoe Kyun	162511	Thet Kei Tan		
Kyaung Kone	162507	Thet Kei Tan	17.8195°N 95.4226°E	
Kyun Thar Yar	162513	Thet Kei Tan		
Myit Thar	162506	Thet Kei Tan	17.8169°N 95.4318°E	
Nyaung Kone	162508	Thet Kei Tan	17.8226°N 95.4224°E	
Hpa Yar Kyun	162509	Thet Kei Tan	17.8205°N 95.4578°E	
Taung Su Lay	162510	Thet Kei Tan		
Ye Baw Kyun	162512	Thet Kei Tan	17.8239°N 95.4408°E	
Let Kyar Kone	162514	Thet Kei Tan	17.8122°N 95.4632°E	
Kyauk Pon	162515	Thet Kei Tan		
Chin Kone	162505	Thet Kei Tan	17.807°N 95.436°E	
Bi Aing Lel	151796	Gway Tauk Chaung		
Gway Tauk Chaung	151791	Gway Tauk Chaung	17.9157°N 95.4395°E	
Ywar Thit Kone	151792	Gway Tauk Chaung		
Nan Kat	151793	Gway Tauk Chaung	17.9074°N 95.4333°E	
Ein Gyi Tan	151795	Gway Tauk Chaung		
Yae Lel Kyun	151797	Gway Tauk Chaung	17.9015°N 95.4027°E	
Nan Gat Pyin Su	151798	Gway Tauk Chaung	17.9097°N 95.4382°E	
Da Min Kyun (East)	151799	Gway Tauk Chaung	17.8964°N 95.4169°E	
Nyaung Kone	151800	Gway Tauk Chaung	17.9221°N 95.4373°E	
Da Min Kyun (West)	151801	Gway Tauk Chaung	17.8951°N 95.4007°E	
Da Min Kyun (North)	151802	Gway Tauk Chaung	17.9012°N 95.4156°E	
Lan Dar	151794	Gway Tauk Chaung	17.9265°N 95.4348°E	
Oe Kwe	158733	Oe Kwe	17.8869°N 95.3985°E	
Pyo Kone	158734	Oe Kwe	17.8782°N 95.3948°E	
Da Naw	158735	Oe Kwe	17.8851°N 95.4066°E	
Gway Kone	158736	Oe Kwe	17.9034°N 95.3826°E	
Tha Yet Ta Pin	158737	Oe Kwe	17.8727°N 95.3484°E	
Inn Kauk	158738	Oe Kwe	17.8828°N 95.3713°E	
Yet Kan Sin	158739	Oe Kwe	17.8849°N 95.3438°E	
Hpan Khar	158740	Oe Kwe		
Wet That Kone	158741	Oe Kwe	17.9°N 95.3516°E	
Pan Toe	158742	Oe Kwe	17.8799°N 95.4126°E	
Kat Kho Kone	158743	Oe Kwe	17.8733°N 95.3562°E	
Kan Thar Bon Myint	158990	Pa Toke	17.8673°N 95.3756°E	
Pa Toke	158988	Pa Toke	17.8689°N 95.3833°E	
Nga Yoke Yoe	158989	Pa Toke	17.87°N 95.3887°E	
Ta Khun Taing	163178	Wet La Har	17.8692°N 95.3181°E	
Ta Kei Thu	163175	Wet La Har	17.8414°N 95.3389°E	
Ka Nyin Ta Pin	163177	Wet La Har	17.835°N 95.3519°E	
Nga Thaing Inn Kone	163176	Wet La Har	17.8684°N 95.3591°E	
Tar Chaung	163179	Wet La Har	17.8561°N 95.359°E	
Gyan Pyin (East)	163180	Wet La Har	17.8541°N 95.3608°E	
Hnaw Kone	163174	Wet La Har	17.8526°N 95.3391°E	
Gyan Pyin (West)	163181	Wet La Har	17.8471°N 95.3579°E	
Wet La Har	163173	Wet La Har	17.8549°N 95.3337°E	
Kyoet Pin	155610	Kyoet Pin	17.9266°N 95.3405°E	
Taw Win	155614	Kyoet Pin	17.9131°N 95.3339°E	
Tha Ye Kone	155613	Kyoet Pin	17.9212°N 95.3415°E	
Si Kaing	155612	Kyoet Pin	17.9043°N 95.3221°E	
Kan Gyi Kone	155611	Kyoet Pin	17.9182°N 95.3401°E	
Pet Tan Kone	155615	Kyoet Pin	17.9069°N 95.3311°E	
Tar Nar	152623	Htan Pin Kan	17.7518°N 95.2298°E	
Lel U	152621	Htan Pin Kan	17.7513°N 95.2251°E	
Tha Zin Kwin	152622	Htan Pin Kan	17.7593°N 95.2247°E	
Shwe Hlay Kwin	152620	Htan Pin Kan	17.7556°N 95.2316°E	
In Gyin Kone	152624	Htan Pin Kan	17.76°N 95.2326°E	
Htan Pin Kan	152619	Htan Pin Kan	17.7472°N 95.2245°E	
Myauk Su	160714	Son Kone	17.7396°N 95.2294°E	
Ah Lel Kwin	160715	Son Kone	17.746°N 95.2282°E	
Ta Dar U	160713	Son Kone	17.7362°N 95.2243°E	
Son Kone	160710	Son Kone	17.7361°N 95.2347°E	
Shwe U Daung	160712	Son Kone		
Tar Nar	160711	Son Kone	17.7411°N 95.2325°E	
Shwe Taung Su	157115	Ma Gyi Kone	17.7719°N 95.2559°E	
Ma Gyi Kone	157106	Ma Gyi Kone	17.7695°N 95.2506°E	
Shan Taw Ywar Thit	157108	Ma Gyi Kone	17.7844°N 95.2711°E	
Gyan Kone	157110	Ma Gyi Kone	17.7664°N 95.2675°E	
Ah Yoe Taung Kone	157111	Ma Gyi Kone	17.7666°N 95.2448°E	
Oe Bo Kone	157112	Ma Gyi Kone	17.7816°N 95.2543°E	
Pein Inn Kone	157114	Ma Gyi Kone	17.782°N 95.2682°E	
Kyee Pauk Kone	157107	Ma Gyi Kone	17.7745°N 95.2697°E	
Kan Nar Ywar Thit	157116	Ma Gyi Kone	17.7647°N 95.26°E	
Tha Pyay Kone	157117	Ma Gyi Kone	17.7761°N 95.2572°E	
Pu Zun Daung Kone	157118	Ma Gyi Kone	17.7774°N 95.2699°E	
Lay Pin Saing Kone	157119	Ma Gyi Kone	17.7798°N 95.2691°E	
Hmaw Taw Kone	157113	Ma Gyi Kone	17.7719°N 95.2645°E	
Kyaung Kone	157109	Ma Gyi Kone	17.7846°N 95.2626°E	
Yae War Kone	151537	Dei Poke Kwin	17.7787°N 95.2303°E	
Htan Pin Kone Tar Gyi Tan	151536	Dei Poke Kwin	17.762°N 95.2348°E	
Htan Pin Kone Ywar Ma	151535	Dei Poke Kwin	17.7624°N 95.2289°E	
Kyoet Kone	151534	Dei Poke Kwin	17.772°N 95.2325°E	
Yae War	151538	Dei Poke Kwin	17.7652°N 95.232°E	
Ywar Thit Kone	151533	Dei Poke Kwin	17.7652°N 95.2378°E	
Ah Shey Su	151532	Dei Poke Kwin	17.7685°N 95.2348°E	
Htan Kone	151531	Dei Poke Kwin	17.7684°N 95.233°E	
Kyaung Su	151530	Dei Poke Kwin	17.7679°N 95.2296°E	
Dei Poke Kwin	151529	Dei Poke Kwin	17.7672°N 95.2407°E	
Kan Bet	153792	Kan Bet	17.7787°N 95.3177°E	
Thar Yar Kone	153794	Kan Bet	17.7582°N 95.3063°E	
Shan Su Lay Ein Tan	153793	Kan Bet	17.768°N 95.3156°E	
Ka Nyin Seik	153795	Kan Bet	17.7611°N 95.2659°E	
Chauk	151062	Chauk	17.7167°N 95.2°E	
Koe Thaung	151066	Chauk		
Shwe Chaung Aing	151065	Chauk	17.6942°N 95.1961°E	
Daunt Gyi	151064	Chauk	17.6912°N 95.2054°E	
Kyon Po	151063	Chauk	17.7037°N 95.1898°E	
Zee Hpyu Kone	156460	Kywe Thaung	17.6532°N 95.204°E	
Hman Kone	156459	Kywe Thaung	17.6708°N 95.1807°E	
Tha Nat Khon	156458	Kywe Thaung	17.68°N 95.1855°E	
Kywe Thaung	156457	Kywe Thaung	17.6589°N 95.1909°E	
Baw Sa Kaing	156461	Kywe Thaung	17.6877°N 95.1929°E	
Thone Kwin Saing	155461	Kyee Gyi	17.7351°N 95.1686°E	
Te Gyi su	155464	Kyee Gyi	17.7542°N 95.1616°E	
Htan Kone	155465	Kyee Gyi	17.7378°N 95.1979°E	
Hmat Taing	155462	Kyee Gyi	17.7259°N 95.159°E	
Tu Myaung	155460	Kyee Gyi		
Kyaung Su	155459	Kyee Gyi	17.7428°N 95.1596°E	
Sit Kwin	155458	Kyee Gyi	17.7394°N 95.161°E	
Da Yin Kauk	155457	Kyee Gyi	17.7271°N 95.1764°E	
Kyee Gyi	155456	Kyee Gyi	17.7468°N 95.1825°E	
Kwin Lel Su	155463	Kyee Gyi	17.7481°N 95.1656°E	
Nyaung Pin Thar	152106	Hmat Taing	17.7074°N 95.1553°E	
Lel Di	152100	Hmat Taing	17.7203°N 95.1742°E	
Taw Shey	152104	Hmat Taing	17.7142°N 95.1492°E	
Kyaung Kwin	152103	Hmat Taing	17.7198°N 95.1588°E	
Te Gyi Kone	152102	Hmat Taing	17.7109°N 95.1613°E	
Kyon Po	152101	Hmat Taing	17.7054°N 95.1846°E	
Hnget Kyaw Kone	152099	Hmat Taing	17.7232°N 95.1783°E	
Nwar Chan	152098	Hmat Taing		
Htan Kone	152105	Hmat Taing	17.7263°N 95.1548°E	
Kan	152097	Hmat Taing	17.7259°N 95.1704°E	
Hmat Taing	152096	Hmat Taing	17.7261°N 95.1625°E	
Tha Yet Kone	155033	Kya Khat Kwin	17.7054°N 95.1251°E	
Myauk Chaw Kone	155036	Kya Khat Kwin	17.7037°N 95.1477°E	
Htan Ma Kone	155039	Kya Khat Kwin	17.6943°N 95.1341°E	
Kun Chan Su	155037	Kya Khat Kwin	17.6879°N 95.1244°E	
Kyun Taw Kone	155035	Kya Khat Kwin	17.7017°N 95.1326°E	
Chin Su	155034	Kya Khat Kwin	17.7048°N 95.1291°E	
Kya Khat Kwin	155030	Kya Khat Kwin	17.6906°N 95.135°E	
Nyaung Pin Thar	155031	Kya Khat Kwin	17.7054°N 95.1561°E	
Taw Shey	155032	Kya Khat Kwin	17.7132°N 95.1471°E	
Ma Gyi Kone	155038	Kya Khat Kwin	17.6863°N 95.1291°E	
Thar Yar Kone	154923	Kwin Kauk (South)		
Ywar Ka Lay	154924	Kwin Kauk (South)	17.7586°N 95.1287°E	
Ywar Thar Kone	154937	Kwin Kauk (South)		
Baw Di Kone	154936	Kwin Kauk (South)		
Myan Aung Su (Taw Te Su)	154935	Kwin Kauk (South)	17.7408°N 95.1416°E	
Daunt Gyi	154934	Kwin Kauk (South)		
Lein Kone	154925	Kwin Kauk (South)	17.7508°N 95.1367°E	
Min Da Lin Kwin	154920	Kwin Kauk (South)	17.7681°N 95.121°E	
Myan Aung Su	154926	Kwin Kauk (South)	17.745°N 95.1376°E	
Kyar Inn	154927	Kwin Kauk (South)	17.7389°N 95.1515°E	
Yoe Gyi	154928	Kwin Kauk (South)	17.7383°N 95.1456°E	
Kyoe Kyar Kwin	154929	Kwin Kauk (South)	17.7445°N 95.1404°E	
Be Inn	154930	Kwin Kauk (South)	17.7622°N 95.1501°E	
Be Inn (Taw Te Su)	154931	Kwin Kauk (South)	17.7545°N 95.1504°E	
Boet Kone	154933	Kwin Kauk (South)	17.7627°N 95.1238°E	
Ywar Thit Kone	154919	Kwin Kauk (South)	17.7621°N 95.1294°E	
Pauk Thar Kone	154918	Kwin Kauk (South)	17.7575°N 95.1253°E	
Kwin Kauk (South)	154917	Kwin Kauk (South)	17.765°N 95.1294°E	
Nyaung Kone	154932	Kwin Kauk (South)	17.7601°N 95.1238°E	
Pauk Pin Chaung	154921	Kwin Kauk (South)	17.7481°N 95.1202°E	
Kyun Taw Kone	154922	Kwin Kauk (South)	17.7588°N 95.133°E	
Shwe Kyoet Pin	154873	Kwin Hla	17.7023°N 95.1194°E	
Htan Kone	154879	Kwin Hla	17.7264°N 95.1499°E	
Nwar Nat Kwin	154878	Kwin Hla	17.7209°N 95.1387°E	
Nyaung Pin Sho	154877	Kwin Hla	17.7264°N 95.1312°E	
Kyee Pin Kwin	154876	Kwin Hla	17.7104°N 95.1271°E	
Nga Poke Kwin	154874	Kwin Hla	17.7038°N 95.1218°E	
Wet Gyi Chaung	154872	Kwin Hla	17.7021°N 95.1152°E	
Lin Kaung Poe	154871	Kwin Hla	17.7066°N 95.1118°E	
Ah Lel Yoe	154870	Kwin Hla	17.713°N 95.1157°E	
Kwin Hla	154869	Kwin Hla	17.7201°N 95.1263°E	
Shan Su	154875	Kwin Hla	17.7227°N 95.1157°E	
Kwin Gyi	156966	Lin Lun Pin	17.7351°N 95.129°E	
Lin Lun Pin	156964	Lin Lun Pin	17.7377°N 95.1249°E	
Bant Bway Kone	156965	Lin Lun Pin	17.7391°N 95.121°E	
Shan Su Taung Kone	156971	Lin Lun Pin	17.7244°N 95.1133°E	
Yae Though Kan	156967	Lin Lun Pin	17.7283°N 95.1165°E	
Shan Su (East)	156968	Lin Lun Pin	17.7246°N 95.1165°E	
Thin Taw Myaung	156969	Lin Lun Pin	17.7415°N 95.1161°E	
Pauk Pin Chaung	156970	Lin Lun Pin	17.7457°N 95.1201°E	
Kone Gyi	159325	Pein Hne Kwin	17.7125°N 95.0947°E	
Gwet Gyi	159333	Pein Hne Kwin	17.7351°N 95.0755°E	
Ta Dar U	159332	Pein Hne Kwin	17.7127°N 95.1063°E	
Kyaung Kone	159331	Pein Hne Kwin	17.715°N 95.1093°E	
Tha Bawt	159330	Pein Hne Kwin	17.7176°N 95.1086°E	
Tha Yet Kone	159329	Pein Hne Kwin	17.7322°N 95.0965°E	
Sa Bai Hmyaung	159328	Pein Hne Kwin	17.7337°N 95.0933°E	
Pa Dat Kone	159326	Pein Hne Kwin	17.737°N 95.0881°E	
Ka Nyin Ngu	159324	Pein Hne Kwin	17.717°N 95.0954°E	
Than Ba Yar Kone	159323	Pein Hne Kwin	17.7282°N 95.0577°E	
Chin Kaik Kwin	159322	Pein Hne Kwin	17.6998°N 95.0725°E	
Chin Kone Gyi	159321	Pein Hne Kwin	17.7191°N 95.0607°E	
Taung Zin	159320	Pein Hne Kwin	17.7209°N 95.0742°E	
Pein Hne Kwin	159319	Pein Hne Kwin	17.7074°N 95.0839°E	
Za Loke Ma	159327	Pein Hne Kwin	17.741°N 95.0987°E	
Myauk Ma Htar	154531	Kone Pyin	17.7641°N 95.0378°E	
Kan Nar Su	154525	Kone Pyin	17.7705°N 95.0401°E	
Kyauk Htat	154526	Kone Pyin	17.7639°N 95.0415°E	
Kyee Pin	154529	Kone Pyin	17.7396°N 95.0087°E	
Kyoet Pin su	154528	Kone Pyin	17.7555°N 95.0371°E	
Hpa Yar Chaung	154524	Kone Pyin	17.7807°N 95.0376°E	
Htone Paw	154530	Kone Pyin	17.7446°N 95.0212°E	
Kone Pyin	154523	Kone Pyin	17.779°N 95.0454°E	
Kyauk Ta Lone	154527	Kone Pyin	17.7548°N 95.0266°E	
Wet Hto	161767	Tha Pyay Kone	17.6853°N 95.1098°E	
Ma Gyi Kone Lay	161771	Tha Pyay Kone	17.6913°N 95.108°E	
Kyaung Kone	161770	Tha Pyay Kone	17.6887°N 95.1149°E	
Ywar Thit Kone	161769	Tha Pyay Kone	17.6986°N 95.1168°E	
Nyar Khan	161768	Tha Pyay Kone	17.696°N 95.1202°E	
Tha Pyay Kone	161766	Tha Pyay Kone	17.696°N 95.1116°E	
Kwin Kauk (North)	154909	Kwin Kauk (North)	17.7686°N 95.1309°E	
Chaung Gwa	154910	Kwin Kauk (North)	17.7744°N 95.1083°E	
Kun Chan Kone	154912	Kwin Kauk (North)	17.7774°N 95.133°E	
Gway Dauk Kwin	154913	Kwin Kauk (North)	17.7757°N 95.1391°E	
Ah Nyar Tan	154914	Kwin Kauk (North)	17.7752°N 95.1342°E	
Aung Chan Thar	154915	Kwin Kauk (North)	17.7729°N 95.1224°E	
Thar Paung	154916	Kwin Kauk (North)	17.7696°N 95.1251°E	
Ta Loke Kone	154911	Kwin Kauk (North)	17.7709°N 95.1155°E	
Ngar Taw Gyi Kone	150977	Bwet (East)	17.8°N 95.1354°E	
U Yin Kone	150978	Bwet (East)	17.7961°N 95.1069°E	
Nin Kyan Kone	150980	Bwet (East)	17.7914°N 95.1362°E	
Rakhine Kone	150974	Bwet (East)	17.8007°N 95.1139°E	
Thone Te Su	150981	Bwet (East)	17.7874°N 95.1108°E	
Beit Pyar Kone	150979	Bwet (East)	17.793°N 95.1471°E	
Oke Twin Kone	150975	Bwet (East)	17.7925°N 95.118°E	
Sein Kyaung Kone	150973	Bwet (East)	17.7979°N 95.1408°E	
Shwe Laung Kan	150972	Bwet (East)	17.7977°N 95.0944°E	
Bwet (Middle)	150971	Bwet (East)	17.7892°N 95.1231°E	
Bwet (West)	150970	Bwet (East)	17.7894°N 95.12°E	
Bwet (East)	150969	Bwet (East)	17.7872°N 95.1271°E	
Kyun Taw	150976	Bwet (East)	17.7929°N 95.1045°E	
Ka Na So Kone	160904	Ta Laing Kwin	17.7662°N 95.1474°E	
Ta Laing Kwin	160898	Ta Laing Kwin	17.7578°N 95.1722°E	
Kan Kyoe	160907	Ta Laing Kwin	17.7748°N 95.1673°E	
Wet Kone	160906	Ta Laing Kwin	17.7661°N 95.1405°E	
Ywar Thit Kone	160905	Ta Laing Kwin	17.769°N 95.1426°E	
Tha Pyay Tone Le	160903	Ta Laing Kwin	17.7649°N 95.1598°E	
Tha Yet Kone	160902	Ta Laing Kwin	17.7644°N 95.1511°E	
Auk Su	160901	Ta Laing Kwin	17.7506°N 95.1807°E	
Do Tan	160900	Ta Laing Kwin	17.7793°N 95.1778°E	
Thea Taw	160899	Ta Laing Kwin	17.7677°N 95.1769°E	
Nyaung Pin Te	158569	Nyaung Pin Te	17.7814°N 95.1721°E	
Tar Chaung	158574	Nyaung Pin Te	17.802°N 95.1478°E	
Shauk Khon	158572	Nyaung Pin Te	17.7949°N 95.1584°E	
Kan Kyoe	158571	Nyaung Pin Te	17.7815°N 95.1612°E	
Nyaung Pin Gyi Su	158570	Nyaung Pin Te	17.789°N 95.1622°E	
Ohn Pin Su	158576	Nyaung Pin Te	17.799°N 95.1499°E	
Sar Kyet Kone	158575	Nyaung Pin Te		
Kyee Taw Ngu	158573	Nyaung Pin Te		
Shauk Kone	160469	Si Pin	17.8189°N 95.1885°E	
Si Pin	160468	Si Pin	17.8245°N 95.193°E	
Hpyin Sin	160472	Si Pin	17.8249°N 95.1826°E	
Te Gyi Kone	160471	Si Pin	17.8118°N 95.1916°E	
Kyaung Kone	160470	Si Pin	17.8238°N 95.1879°E	
Htone Bo	155084	Kyan Tan Kwin	17.807°N 95.1828°E	
Kyan Tan Kwin	155080	Kyan Tan Kwin	17.817°N 95.1807°E	
Yae Twin Hla	155081	Kyan Tan Kwin	17.801°N 95.1788°E	
Tha Khut Kwin	155082	Kyan Tan Kwin	17.8109°N 95.178°E	
Lu Pyo Taw Kwin	155083	Kyan Tan Kwin	17.8082°N 95.1681°E	
Kyaung Kone	155085	Kyan Tan Kwin	17.8126°N 95.1729°E	
Zee Hpyu Kone	153564	Ka Nyut Kwin	17.8511°N 95.1058°E	
Ka Nyut Kwin	153559	Ka Nyut Kwin	17.8571°N 95.0807°E	
Hlan Hto Kone	153560	Ka Nyut Kwin	17.8572°N 95.1032°E	
Shar Taw	153561	Ka Nyut Kwin	17.8555°N 95.0898°E	
Be Pyar	153563	Ka Nyut Kwin	17.8437°N 95.1037°E	
War Bo	153565	Ka Nyut Kwin	17.8658°N 95.082°E	
Tha Yet Oke	153562	Ka Nyut Kwin	17.8501°N 95.0622°E	
In Pin Hla	155397	Kyaung Kwin	17.9112°N 95.1694°E	
Tu Myaung	155399	Kyaung Kwin	17.9324°N 95.167°E	
Nyaung Pin Kwin	155398	Kyaung Kwin	17.926°N 95.1528°E	
Ywar Thit Kone	155396	Kyaung Kwin	17.9192°N 95.1486°E	
Khway Poke Kone	155395	Kyaung Kwin	17.9297°N 95.1656°E	
Shwe Naing Wa	155394	Kyaung Kwin	17.9359°N 95.1821°E	
Kyaung Kwin	155388	Kyaung Kwin	17.9305°N 95.1432°E	
Si Pin Kyin	155389	Kyaung Kwin	17.93°N 95.1115°E	
La Moke Kwin	155390	Kyaung Kwin	17.9272°N 95.1481°E	
Kyaung Kone	155393	Kyaung Kwin	17.9291°N 95.1723°E	
Ah Kya Kwin	155392	Kyaung Kwin	17.8968°N 95.1079°E	
Kyat Gyi	155391	Kyaung Kwin	17.9154°N 95.1573°E	
Ma Ye Kwin	154357	Khon Gyi	17.8811°N 95.111°E	
Aye Mya Kone	154367	Khon Gyi	17.8673°N 95.1102°E	
Khon Gyi	154351	Khon Gyi	17.8953°N 95.1062°E	
Ma Gyi Pin Kwin	154353	Khon Gyi	17.8989°N 95.0964°E	
Kyauk Pyoke	154354	Khon Gyi	17.844°N 95.1333°E	
Nyaung Pin Thar	154355	Khon Gyi	17.8932°N 95.1141°E	
Ka Tu Pauk	154356	Khon Gyi	17.8908°N 95.117°E	
Ta Laing Khon	154352	Khon Gyi	17.8805°N 95.1255°E	
Oke Shit Kone	154358	Khon Gyi	17.8652°N 95.1053°E	
Taung Paw Kone	154365	Khon Gyi	17.8848°N 95.1269°E	
Ka Nyin Su	154362	Khon Gyi	17.8675°N 95.1285°E	
Kan Ni	154363	Khon Gyi	17.8586°N 95.1298°E	
Ga Yet	154364	Khon Gyi	17.8796°N 95.1453°E	
Kyee Kone	154359	Khon Gyi		
Oke Shit Khar	154366	Khon Gyi	17.858°N 95.1188°E	
Taung Poet Pauk	154361	Khon Gyi	17.8524°N 95.1149°E	
Ma Dawt Pin	154360	Khon Gyi	17.8589°N 95.125°E	
Pein Inn	158356	Nwar Chan	17.8376°N 95.1401°E	
Pauk Pin Kwin	158355	Nwar Chan	17.8113°N 95.1442°E	
Thea Hpyu	158354	Nwar Chan	17.822°N 95.1455°E	
Nwar Chan Kone	158352	Nwar Chan	17.8256°N 95.1392°E	
Kone Taung Ni	158363	Nwar Chan	17.8281°N 95.1211°E	
Thea Kone	158359	Nwar Chan	17.8426°N 95.1442°E	
Shan Thay Yoe	158353	Nwar Chan	17.8287°N 95.1561°E	
Let Pan Kaing	158366	Nwar Chan	17.8129°N 95.1402°E	
Kyin Taung Ni	158364	Nwar Chan	17.8279°N 95.1268°E	
Sun Chet Inn	158362	Nwar Chan	17.8381°N 95.1163°E	
Sit Kwin	158365	Nwar Chan	17.8195°N 95.1372°E	
Thaik Tu Kwin	158357	Nwar Chan	17.8167°N 95.1594°E	
Nwar Chan Kyin	158358	Nwar Chan	17.8299°N 95.1449°E	
Kun Ohn	158360	Nwar Chan	17.8435°N 95.1297°E	
Kyee Taw Ngu	158361	Nwar Chan	17.8192°N 95.1222°E	
Ma Yan Hmyaung	158370	Nwar Chan	17.8083°N 95.141°E	
Sar Hpyu Su	158369	Nwar Chan	17.8406°N 95.1344°E	
Taung Kone Lay	158367	Nwar Chan	17.8338°N 95.1538°E	
Pay Kone	158368	Nwar Chan	17.8418°N 95.1365°E	
Tha Yet Hpone Ku	158371	Nwar Chan	17.8148°N 95.1288°E	
Kyauk Gyi Hmyaung	163992	Zay Di Khon	17.7982°N 95.0626°E	
Zay Di Khon	163985	Zay Di Khon	17.8082°N 95.0862°E	
Kyee Waing Kyee	163987	Zay Di Khon	17.7912°N 95.0813°E	
Kun Ohn	163989	Zay Di Khon	17.7851°N 95.0822°E	
Shan Kwin	163991	Zay Di Khon	17.7792°N 95.0672°E	
Taing Ta Soet	163986	Zay Di Khon	17.8003°N 95.0752°E	
Ywar Thar Kone	163993	Zay Di Khon	17.7936°N 95.0504°E	
Hnget Pyaw Taw Su	163994	Zay Di Khon	17.7908°N 95.0554°E	
Htan Pin Kone	163995	Zay Di Khon	17.7888°N 95.0457°E	
Myay Ni Taung	163996	Zay Di Khon	17.7761°N 95.0545°E	
Tu Myaung	163997	Zay Di Khon	17.8169°N 95.0843°E	
Daunt Gyi	163998	Zay Di Khon	17.7758°N 95.0732°E	
Ohn Pin Chaung	163990	Zay Di Khon	17.7829°N 95.0611°E	
Kywe Te	163988	Zay Di Khon	17.7962°N 95.0911°E	
Saw Pyar	152009	Hle Hmauk	17.8178°N 95.0573°E	
Yae Htwet Khon	152008	Hle Hmauk	17.8325°N 95.0683°E	
Ka Nyin Pin Kwin	152012	Hle Hmauk	17.8139°N 95.0755°E	
Me Za Li Kyin	152011	Hle Hmauk	17.8229°N 95.0855°E	
Hle Hmauk	152006	Hle Hmauk	17.8417°N 95.06°E	
Tha Pyay Pin	152007	Hle Hmauk	17.8323°N 95.0847°E	
Kone Gyi	152010	Hle Hmauk	17.8188°N 95.0652°E	
Thar Yar Kone	153910	Kan Kwin	17.7694°N 95.0712°E	
Kun Chan Su	153909	Kan Kwin	17.7623°N 95.0893°E	
Myaung Su	153908	Kan Kwin	17.7666°N 95.0869°E	
Kyan Taw	153906	Kan Kwin	17.79°N 95.1071°E	
Pauk Pin Kwin	153905	Kan Kwin	17.7899°N 95.1002°E	
San Chaung	153904	Kan Kwin	17.7841°N 95.0975°E	
Zee Kone	153903	Kan Kwin	17.7801°N 95.0928°E	
Taw Nay San	153902	Kan Kwin	17.7629°N 95.0993°E	
Kan Kwin	153901	Kan Kwin	17.7702°N 95.0893°E	
San Dar Kwin	153907	Kan Kwin	17.7688°N 95.0819°E	
