= Myanaung District =

Myanaung District မြန်အောင်ခရိုင်
- District of Ayeyarwady Division
- Coordinates: 18°06′38″N 95°22′36″E
- Country: Myanmar
- Division: Ayeyarwady
- District: Myanaung

Area
  - Total: 1,672.104 sq mi (4,330.73 km^{2})

Population (2019)
  - Total: 544,193
  - Density: 325.454/sq mi (125.659/km^{2})
- Time zone: UTC6:30 (MST)

Myanaung District is a district of the Ayeyarwady Region in Myanmar.

The Myanaung District is a newer district grouping three townships formerly part of Hinthada District. The main administrative GAD office was opened on July 1, 2022. The District consists of Kyangin Township, Myanaung Township and Ingapu Township.
