= Lists of villages =

This is a list of lists of villages.

== India ==
=== Bihar ===
- List of villages in Araria
- List of villages in Aurangabad
- List of villages in Bhojpur
- List of villages in Buxar
- List of villages in Saran
- List of villages in Darbhanga
- List of villages in Gaya
- List of villages in Kaimur
- List of villages in Kishanganj
- List of villages in Lakhisarai
- List of villages in Madhubani
- List of villages in Saharsa
- List of villages in Samastipur
- List of villages in Saran
- List of villages in Sheikhpura
- List of villages in Sitamarhi
- List of villages in Siwan
- List of villages in Vaishali

=== Jharkhand ===
- List of villages in East Singhbhum district
- List of villages in Khunti district
- List of villages in Ramgarh district
- List of villages in Seraikela Kharsawan district
- List of villages in Simdega district

== Myanmar ==
=== Hinthada District ===
- List of villages in Hinthada Township
- List of villages in Ingapu Township
- List of villages in Kyangin Township
- List of villages in Laymyethna Township
- List of villages in Myanaung Township
- List of villages in Zalun Township

== Nigeria ==
- List of villages in the Federal Capital Territory, Nigeria
- List of villages in Abia State
- List of villages in Adamawa State
- List of villages in Akwa Ibom State
- List of villages in Anambra State
- List of villages in Bauchi State
- List of villages in Bayelsa State
- List of villages in Benue State
- List of villages in Borno State
- List of villages in Cross River State
- List of villages in Delta State
- List of villages in Ebonyi State
- List of villages in Edo State
- List of villages in Ekiti State
- List of villages in Enugu State
- List of villages in Gombe State
- List of villages in Imo State
- List of villages in Jigawa State
- List of villages in Kaduna State
- List of villages in Kano State
- List of villages in Katsina State
- List of villages in Kebbi State
- List of villages in Kogi State
- List of villages in Kwara State
- List of villages in Lagos State
- List of villages in Nasarawa State
- List of villages in Niger State
- List of villages in Ogun State
- List of villages in Ondo State
- List of villages in Osun State
- List of villages in Oyo State
- List of villages in Plateau State
- List of villages in Rivers State
- List of villages in Sokoto State
- List of villages in Taraba State
- List of villages in Yobe State
- List of villages in Zamfara State

== Norway ==
- List of villages in Akershus
- List of villages in Aust-Agder
- List of villages in Buskerud
- List of villages in Finnmark
- List of villages in Hedmark
- List of villages in Hordaland
- List of villages in Møre og Romsdal
- List of villages in Nordland
- List of villages in Oppland
- List of villages in Rogaland
- List of villages in Sogn og Fjordane
- List of villages in Telemark
- List of villages in Troms
- List of villages in Trøndelag
- List of villages in Vest-Agder
- List of villages in Vestfold
- List of villages in Østfold
