= List of villages in Bihar =

Administrative Division in Details
- Divisions: 9
- Districts: 38
- Subdivisions: 101
- Cities and towns: 207
- Blocks: 534
- Villages: 45,103
- Panchayats: 8,406
- Police Districts: 43
- Police Stations: 853

There are around 45,000 villages in 38 districts of Bihar.

- List of villages in Araria
- List of villages in Aurangabad
- List of villages in Bhojpur
- List of villages in Buxar
- List of villages in Saran
- List of villages in Darbhanga
- List of villages in Gaya
- List of villages in Kaimur
- List of villages in Kishanganj
- List of villages in Lakhisarai
- List of villages in Madhubani
- List of villages in Saharsa
- List of villages in Samastipur
- List of villages in Saran
- List of villages in Sheikhpura
- List of villages in Sitamarhi
- List of villages in Siwan
- List of villages in Vaishali

== See also ==
- India
- Bihar
- Government of Bihar
- Administration in Bihar
- Cities in Bihar
- Districts of Bihar
- Divisions of India
- Subdivisions of Bihar
- Blocks in Bihar
