= Akhta =

Akhta may refer to:

- Akhta, Sitamarhi, a village in Sitamarhi district, Bihar, India
- Akhta Uttar, a gram panchayat in Sitamarhi district, Bihar, India
- Akhta, Vayots Dzor, a village in Vayots Dzor Province, Armenia
