= Kodhiyar =

Kodhiyar is a village in the Sitamarhi district, Bihar state, India. It is situated one kilometer east from the Bagmati River and four kilometers south of Dhang Railway Station. Adjacent to the village of Akhta, it is located in the Suppi subdistrict and governed by the Akhta Uttar panchayat.
