= List of villages in Kishanganj district =

Kishanganj district of Bihar, India comprises only one sub-division, Kishanganj, which is divided into 7 Blocks and has a total of 771 villages. There are 39 uninhabited villages (out of 771 total villages) in the district of Kishanganj.

This is list of villages of Kishanganj district according to respective blocks.

== Bhahadurganj ==
1. Altabari
2. Babhantola Laucha
3. Baisa
4. Baisa Jurail
5. Baisagopalganj
6. Bangaon
7. Bangaon Milik
8. Baradenga
9. Basbari
10. Belbari
11. Betbari
12. Bhadesar
13. Bhatabari
14. Bhaurdah
15. Bhupla
16. Birnia
17. Birpur
18. Bishunpur
19. Bochagari
20. Brahmotar Gachh
21. Chanaur
22. Chanaur Milik
23. Chandargaon
24. Charakpara Laucha
25. Chhota Laucha
26. Chikabari
27. Chorkattakurhaila
28. Dabar
29. Dahgaon
30. Dahgaon
31. Dala
32. Dala Mohiuddinpur
33. Damdama
34. Deotar Birnia
35. Deshiatoli
36. Dharhar
37. Dogacchi
38. Dohar
39. Domohani
40. Duadangi
41. Dulali
42. Dulali
43. Dulali Milik
44. Durgapur
45. Durgapur Bangaon
46. Durgapur Sohadi
47. Gangi
48. Goabari
49. Gopalpur Bairgachhi
50. Guabari
51. Gurgaon
52. Gurgaon Milik
53. Haribhasa
54. Haribhasa
55. Jhiljhili
56. Jhiljhili
57. Jhingakata
58. Jhingakata Istamrar
59. Jhingakata Taufir
60. Kasbe Anganj Urf KasbaKhodaganj
61. Kathalbari
62. Kathalbari
63. Kharij Kumhia
64. Kharsel
65. Koimari
66. Koimari
67. Korat Bangaon
68. Kumhartoli
69. Kurhaila
70. Lahsora
71. Laucha
72. Lohia Kandar
73. Lohia Kandar
74. Mahadeo Dighi
75. Mahammad Nagar
76. Mahesh Bathna
77. Mohan Singh Gachh
78. Muktaram Deori
79. Murmala
80. Musaldenga
81. Netuapara
82. Netuapara
83. Nisndara
84. Pahatgaon
85. Palasmani
86. Phulbari
87. Pipra Gachh
88. Rampur
89. Rangamani
90. Ruidhasa
91. Rupni
92. Sakaur
93. Samesar
94. Satmeri
95. Sikmi Bangaon
96. Siktihar
97. Siktiharuttarbasti
98. Singhia
99. Sukhani
100. Tangtangia
101. Tangtangia
102. Tangtangia
103. Tegharia
104. Tharkachhpur
105. Tulshia

== Dighalbank ==
1. pakkhu basti
2. Aliganj
3. Baijnath Palsa
4. Bansbari
5. Banwaria
6. Barbhang
7. Bhurli Bhita
8. Boaldaha
9. Chhota Garumara
10. Dahibhat
11. Dahibhat Kalan
12. Dahibhat Khurd
13. Dargah Aliganj
14. Dargah Rasulganj
15. Dargah kanchanbari
16. Deogirja
17. Dhanola
18. Dighal Bank
19. Dighal Bank
20. Dighibari
21. Doria
22. Dubri
23. Dubri khas
24. Garbhanadenga
25. Garumara
26. Ghangra
27. Gurhmurha
28. Harhibhita
29. Hari Bhita
30. Haruadanga
31. Hublidenga
32. Ichmari
33. Ikra
34. Ikra Milik
35. Ikra Milik
36. Ikra Milik
37. Jiapokhar
38. Kachunala
39. Kachunala Milik
40. Kachunala Milik
41. Kachunala Milik
42. Kalpir Pathar Ghatti
43. Kamat
44. Kamati
45. Kanchan Bari
46. Karuamani
47. Kast Karam Ali
48. Kumarkhod
49. Kumhia
50. Kurhaili
51. Lachhmipur
52. Lohagarha
53. Lohargarha
54. Mahamari
55. Maldangi
56. Malmali
57. Maltoli
58. Maltoli
59. Mangra
60. Mulabari
61. Mustalaganj
62. Padampur
63. Padampur
64. Pakamari
65. Palsa
66. Palsa Milik
67. Panchgachhi
68. Patharghatti
69. Patharghatti
70. Sat Kauwa
71. Satmeri
72. Singhimari
73. Singhimari Milik
74. Suribhita
75. Talwar Bandha
76. Tanghan Tapu
77. Tapu
78. Tarabari
79. Teli Bhita
80. Tulshia
81. Tulshia Kasht

Fulgachhi

== Kishanganj ==
1. Andhuakol
2. Andowakol
3. Babhantola
4. Bairgachhi
5. Balia
6. Bararo
7. Barchuna
8. Basantpur
9. Basatpur Marua Toli
10. Basatpur Milik
11. Basatpur Pharsadangi
12. Bastadangi
13. Belwa
14. Belwa Kasipur
15. Belwa Milik
16. Bheriadangi
17. Chakla
18. Chaundi
19. Chhagalia
20. Chhagalia
21. Chhota Salki
22. Chormara
23. Daula
24. Dheksara
25. Gachhpara
26. Gachhpara
27. Goaltoli
28. Gobindpur
29. Halamala
30. Janamjai
31. Jharbari
32. Jia Gachhi
33. Kaparporbandha
34. Kasipur
35. Katahalia
36. Katahalia Bhag
37. Katmohan
38. Kirdah Samda
39. Kolaha
40. Lakhimara
41. Lalbari
42. Mahammadpur Bhagal
43. Mahesh Bathna
44. Mahesh Bathna Khas
45. Mahesh Bathnakhas Milik
46. Majhok
47. Meda
48. Mehangaon
49. Mehengaon Milik
50. Motihara
51. Motihara Taluka
52. Nonia
53. Panisal
54. Phulwari
55. Phulwari
56. Phulwari
57. Piakunri
58. Pichhla
59. Pirani
1. Purla bari
2. Satkhamhar
3. Simalbari
4. Singhia
5. Singhia
6. Solki
7. Sultanpur
8. Taisa
9. Telia Pokhar
10. Tengramari
11. Thauapara
12. Thaunapara
13. Topamari
14. Kulamani Royals

== Kochadhaman ==
1. Altabari
2. Anarkali
3. Andhasur
4. Arugaon
5. Asura
6. Babhangaon
7. Bagalbari
8. Bahkol
9. Baichakutti
10. Balia
11. Balubari
12. Barahmasia
13. Barbata
14. Barijan Durgapur
15. Barijan Pothimari Jagir
16. Bastakolaha
17. Bastakolha
18. Bhag Baisa
19. Bhagal
20. Bhagpunash
21. Bhaunra
22. Bhawaniganj
23. Bhebhal
24. Bhebhra
25. Birwachurakutti
26. Birwakalkali
27. Bishunpur
28. Bishunpur
29. Boaldah
30. Bohita
31. Burhimari
32. Chapra Bakhari
33. Charaia
34. Chunamari
35. Churakutti
36. Dahuabari
37. Dalia
38. Danti
39. Daua
40. Deramari
41. Dhanpura
42. Dhanpurakhari
43. Dhanusna
44. Dhanusna
45. Dogharia
46. Dongidighi
47. Dopokharia
48. Doria
49. Dubra
50. Durgapur
51. Gangikhurd
52. Gauramani
53. Ghurna
54. Gurgaon
55. Haldikhora
56. Haribhasa
57. Harkhuguria
58. Harwadanga
59. Hasan Dumaria
60. Hatgachhi
61. Hatgachhi
62. Himatnagar
63. Jadhail
64. Jhantipari Anarkali
65. Jhura
66. Jiwanpur
67. Kabaia
68. Kairbirpur
69. Kajlamari
70. Kalanagin
71. Kalkali
72. Kamalpur
73. Kanhaiabari
74. Karehbari
75. Kashibari
76. Katamata
77. Kathalbari
78. Kochadhaman
79. Koitor
80. Kolaha
81. Konhaiabari
82. Kuari
83. Kushpara
84. Kutti
85. Lator
86. Lodhna
87. Lodhnakhargi
88. Mahadha
89. Mahiarpur
90. Mahua
91. Majgaon
92. Majkuri
93. Makraha
94. Makraha
95. Masidgarh Dargah
96. Masidgarh Milik
97. Masidgarh Mohiuddinpur
98. Masidgarh Pokharkona
99. Mastalia
100. Mehadipur
101. Moharmari
102. Moharmari Khurd
103. Molingaon
104. Mosangaon
105. Mujabari
106. Nagri
107. Najarpur
108. Naranga
109. Natuapara
110. Nihalbhag
111. Pachahara
112. Parhalpur
113. Parhalpur Milik
114. Parwa
115. Patkoi khurd
116. Patkoikalan
117. Phulbari
118. Pipla
119. Pipra
120. Pokharia
121. Potkoi Milik
122. Purandaha
123. Rangamani
124. Rani
125. Rasulganj
126. Rohania
127. Rohia
128. Rohonia Milik
129. Santha
130. Saptia
131. Sarai
132. Satbhitha
133. Sehangaon
134. Shahnagar
135. Shahpur
136. Shahpur Istamrar
137. Singhari
138. Singhia Chakandara
139. Singhiakhari
140. Sirar
141. Sukalrani
142. Sundarbari
143. Sundarpuchhi
144. Surang
145. Tegharia
146. Thutipakar
147. Titiha
148. Titlia
149. Topamari
150. Topamari

== Pothia ==
1. Adhikari
2. Andabari
3. Arrabari
4. Bagalbari
5. Bagalbari Milik
6. Bagalbari Milik Arazi
7. Bagrani
8. Bakhonala
9. Baksa
10. Banasi
11. Barab Kahunia
12. Barapokhar
13. Bhatkhunda
14. Bhatkhunda
15. Bhelagachhi
16. Bhota Thana
17. Birpur
18. Birpur
19. Bisani
20. Bolasan
21. Budhra
22. Burhnai
23. CHilhamari
24. Charkhakati
25. Chechuabari
26. Chhagalia
27. Chhamtia
28. Chhatar Gachh
29. Chiagaon
30. Chitma
31. Chitma
32. Choragaddi
33. Damal Bari
34. Damarbari
35. Darigaon
36. Debiganj
37. Dhangi Pokhar
38. Dhantola
39. Dhekipara
40. Dhobinia
41. Dongra
42. Dubanochi
43. Dubanochi
44. Galgalia
45. Gangnati
46. Gangnati Arazigachh
47. Gelabari
48. Gendaloti
49. Geramari
50. Goabari
51. Gobinda
52. Gorukhal
53. Halda
54. Haldagaon
55. Haldibari
56. Indarpur
57. Indarpur Khurd
58. Jagir Gachh
59. Jahangirpur
60. Jalalpur
61. Jangiabari
62. Jhokha Dangi
63. Jogi Gachh
64. Jogihara
65. Kala Singhia
66. Kalakachu
67. Kalidas
68. Kalidas Arazi kismat
69. Kalidas Kismat
70. Kalupathaurf Koimari
71. Karigaon Milik
72. Kasba Kaliaganj
73. Keso Jara
74. Kharkhari
75. Khatia Pichhla
76. Koltha
77. Kuimari
78. Kulthibari
79. Kusiari
80. Lodhabari
81. Lohagara
82. Lukundra
83. Mahogarh
84. Mahsul
85. Makhan Pokhar
86. Mamubhagina
87. Mangur Jan
88. Mangur Jon
89. Maria
90. Miramani
91. Mirzapur
92. Mohania
93. Molnapara
94. Musaldenga
95. Nandakuri
96. Naribasar
97. Naukatta
98. Naunaddi
99. Naunaddi
100. Nimalagaon
101. Nimalagaon Milik
102. Paharkatta
103. Pakamolna
104. Pakamolna
105. Pakamolna
106. Pamal
107. Panasi
108. Panasi
109. Panbara
110. Panighatta
111. Parla Bari
112. Parlabari Milik
113. Patilabhasa
114. Pawakhali
115. Phala
116. Pharabari
117. Phati Pokhar
118. Phulhara Milik
119. Phulhera
120. Phulhera Gachh
121. Piakori
122. Pokharia
123. Pothia
124. Purandarpur
125. Raipur
126. Ramaniapokhar
127. Rasiadangi
128. Ratanpur
129. Ratua
130. Sahagi
131. Saithabari
132. Saradighi
133. Sarogora
134. Satbaulia
135. Satbaulia Khurd
136. Shekhpura
137. Singhari Gobindpur
138. Singhiamari
139. Sita Jhari
140. Sita Jhari
141. Sital Gachh
142. Sitalpur
143. Sonapur
144. Taiabpur
145. Taria
146. Tarni
147. Theikalbari
148. Thipi Jhari
149. Udgara

== Terhagachh ==
1. Asha
2. Babhangawan
3. Baigna
4. Bairia
5. Balua Jagir
6. Baluadandgi
7. Bansbari
8. Belbarigachh
9. Benugarh
10. Betbari
11. Bhag Kajleta
12. Bhagjhunki
13. Bhardhari
14. Bhelagurhi
15. Bhelagurhi
16. Bhorha
17. Chargharia
18. Chichora
19. Chilhania
20. Dahibhat
21. Dak Pokhar
22. Deorikhas
23. Dhabaili
24. Dhokarjhari
25. Doria
26. Gamharia
27. Gargaon
28. Ghani Phulsara
29. Gilni
30. Hatgaon
31. Hatgaon
32. Hawakol
33. Hawakol Khurd
34. Jhala
35. Jhunki Musahara
36. Kadleta
37. Kalpir
38. Kamat Hatgaon
39. Kamdti Nankar
40. Kanchanbari
41. Kanchanbari Istamrar
42. Khajuribari
43. Khaniabad
44. Khara Suhia
45. Kharij Khaniabad
46. Kharra
47. Kharra Belbari
48. Kharrakasht
49. Khunia Toli
50. Kuari
51. Lodhabari
52. Mahua
53. Mahua Gachh
54. Matiari
55. Mianpur
56. Mianpur
57. Nania
58. Panchgachhi
59. Pharhabari
60. Pharhabari Milik
61. Pharhabari Nankar
62. Phulbari
63. Phulbari
64. Phulbari
65. Phulbari
66. Phulbari Nankar
67. Pipra
68. Pipra
69. Pokharia
70. Pokharia
71. Rahmatpur
72. Rampur
73. Serati Kamati
74. Sharma Toli
75. Sharma Toli
76. Sirnia
77. Sirnia
78. Suhia
79. Suhia Gopalnagar
80. Tegharia
81. Tokabhansa

== Thakurgunj ==
1. Akhra
2. Ambari
3. Amol Jhari
4. Babhangaon
5. Babhangaon
6. Bahadurpur
7. Balka Dobha
8. Bandar Jhula
9. Bandar Jhula
10. Bandar Jhula
11. Bandar Jhula
12. Bandar Jhula
13. Bansbari
14. Barah Pathia
15. Barah Pathia
16. Barah Pathia
17. Barchaundi
18. Barchaundi
19. Besarbati
20. Bhagkharna
21. Bhata Thana
22. Bhatgaon
23. Bhaulmari
24. Bhaulmari
25. Bhaulmari
26. Bhaulmari
27. Bhelagori
28. Bhendrani
29. Bhendrani
30. Bhog Dabar
31. Bhota Thana
32. Bidhibhita
33. Burhnai Bahadurpur
34. Chak Chaki
35. Chapati
36. Chapra Bakhari
37. Chhaital
38. Chhatar Katharo
39. Churli
40. Churli
41. Dakpara
42. Dalligaon
43. Dalligaon
44. Dastur
45. Deramari
46. Dhak Para
47. Dhakpara
48. Dhakpara
49. Dogachhi
50. Dudhaunti
51. Dudhmanjar
52. Dudhmanjar
53. Dumaria
54. Fatehjangpur
55. Gamhirgarh
56. Giddhnikola
57. Gilhabari
58. Gothra
59. Gual Toli
60. Gunjar Mari
61. Harin Dubal
62. Hasanpur
63. Hazarigachh
64. Hulhuli
65. Hulhuli Milik Arazi
66. Hulhuli Milik Arazi
67. Hulhuli Milik Arazi
68. Hulhuli Milik Arazi
69. Hulhuli Milik Arazi
70. Hulhuli Milik Arazi
71. Jiapokhar
72. Jiapokhar
73. Jio Pokhar
74. Jirangachh
75. Kachhudah
76. Kanakpur
77. Karua Mani
78. Karua Mani
79. Karua Mari
80. Katharo
81. Katharo
82. Khanabari
83. Kharna
84. Kharna
85. Kharudah
86. Kharudah
87. Khaurdah
88. Khudra
89. Koia
90. Kudiachhara
91. Kudurbaghi
92. Kukur Baghi Milik
93. Kukurbaghi
94. Kunjimari
95. Kuri Muni
96. Lahugaon Arazi
97. Landhandara
98. Landhandara
99. Latkukur Baghi
100. Malingaon
101. Maujidinga
102. Modati
103. Nazagachh
104. Nazarpur
105. Nikarbari
106. Noniatari
107. Pabna
108. Paikpara
109. Paikpara
110. Panchgachhi
111. Patbhari
112. Patbhari
113. Patesari
114. Patharia
115. Pawa Khali
116. Pawa Khali
117. Petbhari
118. Phatamari
119. Rajagaon
120. Rajagaon
121. Rajagaon Milik
122. Rasia
123. Ruidhasa
124. Sabodangi
125. Sakhuadali
126. Salgori
127. Saraikuri
128. Satbaulia
129. Singhimari
130. Sukhani
131. Tatpowa
132. Teghari
133. Udragori
