= Mahadeo Simaria =

Mahadeo Simaria Mahadeo Simaria
- Village
- Location in Bihar, India Mahadeo Simaria (India)
- Coordinates: 24.922317°N 86.110056°E
- Country: India
- State: Bihar
- District: Jamui
- Tehsil: Sikandra

Government
  - Type: Panchayat raj
  - Body: Gram panchayat

Population (2011)
  - Total: 3,917
- Sex ratio 1994/1923 ♂/♀

Languages
- Time zone: UTC+5:30 (IST)
- PIN: 811313
- ISO 3166 code: IN-BR
- Vehicle registration: BR

Mahadeo Simaria is a village in Jamui district of Bihar State, India. It is located 11.9 kilometres (7.4 mi) from district headquarter Jamui and 165 kilometres (103 mi) from state capital Patna. The village is administrated by Sarpanch an elected representative of the village. There is a Temple to Shiva. Shiva is called Mahadeo, so the village was named Mahadeo Simaria.

The village was a part of " Gidhaur " Kingdom.

== See also ==
- List of villages in India
- List of villages in Bihar
