= Akhta Uttar =

Akhta Uttar (or Akhta North in English) is a gram panchayat in Sitamarhi district (and Suppi subdistrict), Bihar, India. It is named after Akhta, a village located there and the main village of the panchayat. The other villages are Kodhiyar, Madhurapur and Rampur Kanth.
