= Naini =

Naini or Na'ini could refer to:

- Naiṇī Devī, goddess in Hinduism
- Naini, Prayagraj, a neighborhood of Prayagraj, Uttar Pradesh, India
- Naini Rajender Reddy, Indian politician
- Naini (surname), Persian surname
- Nayani Narasimha Reddy (also spelled "Naini Narasimha Reddy"; 1934–2020), Indian politician
- Nayini language (also spelled "Na'ini"), Central Plateau language spoken in Iran
