= Naini (surname) =

Naini (Persian: نائينی), also spelled Naeini, is a surname. Notable people with the name include:

== Naeini ==
- Abolhassan Naeini (born 1955), Iranian academic
- Mahdi Bemani Naeini (born 1968), Iranian film director
- Sara Naeini (born 1981), Iranian singer-songwriter

== Naini ==
- Ali Mohammad Naini (1957–2026), Iranian military officer
- Majid Naini (born 1963), Iranian scholar and speaker
- Muhammad Hussain Naini (1860–1936), Iranian Shia marja

== See also ==
- Oliver Fartach-Naini, German guitarist
