= List of villages in Saran district =

The Saran district of Bihar, India is divided into three sub-divisions and 20 blocks. It has a total of 1,764 villages. This includes 194 uninhabited villages in the district.

This is list of the villages of Saran district according to their respective blocks.

== Amnour ==
1. Admapur
2. Amnaur Aguan
3. Amnaur Aguwan
4. Amnaur Harnaraen
5. Amnaur Kalean
6. Amnaur Sultan
7. Apahar
8. Arazi Dharampur
9. Arna
10. Bagahi
11. Balaha
12. Baldiha
13. Bande
14. Bans Dih
15. Basatpur
16. Basauta
17. Basauti
18. Bedauliya
19. Bhagwatpur
20. Bhatehri
21. Bhatha
22. Bhusna
23. Bishamhar Chhapra
24. Bishunpur
25. Bishunpura
26. Chainpur
27. Chainpur
28. Chak Arna
29. Chak Man
30. Chandpura
31. Chhapra Abhiman
32. Daur Chhapra
33. Dharahra Khurd
34. Dharahra kalan
35. Dharampur Jafar
36. Dhorhlahi Abhiman
37. Dhorhlahi Kaithal
38. Dumaria
39. Firozpur
40. Ganaura
41. Gangapur
42. Garaul
43. Gasa Khap
44. Gawandri
45. Gawandri
46. Gheyaspur
47. Gochhi Chhapra
48. Guna Chhapra
49. Hakma
50. Harpur
51. Hela
52. Husepur
53. Jafarpur
54. Jalalpur
55. Jhakhra
56. Jhaua Patti
57. Jogini
58. Kairganwan
59. Kaithaulia
60. Kasimpur
61. Katsa
62. Kewari Kalan
63. Khas Patti
64. Khori Pakar Badla
65. Khori pakar Kharag
66. Kishunpur
67. Kohripak Gobind
68. Korea
69. Kuari
70. Lakhna
71. Madarpur
72. Madhubani
73. Maksudpur
74. Maksudpur
75. Malahi
76. Manorpur Jhakhari
77. Manpur
78. Munra
79. Narsingh Bhanpur
80. Narsingh Patti
81. Nauranga
82. Nawada
83. Paharpur
84. Paiga Kalan
85. Paiga Mitarsen
86. Paiga Sadar
87. Pakri
88. Pakri Mahammad
89. Panre Tola
90. Parasrampur
91. Parmanand Chhapra
92. Parsa
93. Patrahi Kalan
94. Patrahi Khurd
95. Rahimpur
96. Rahimpur Karan
97. Rajupur
98. Ram Chak
99. Rasulpur
100. Repura
101. Sahadi Chhapra
102. Salkhua
103. Sandalpur
104. Saray Bakhsh
105. Shahpur
106. Shekhpura
107. Shekhpura
108. Shekhpura
109. Shikarpur
110. Sirsia Bali
111. Sirsia Jagdeo
112. Sirsia Khap
113. Sirsia Mani
114. Sirsia Rai
115. Sonaha
116. Takia
117. Tarwar
118. Umarpur

== Baniapur ==
1. Agrauli
2. Amanw
3. Amanw Khurd
4. Anandpur
5. Andhar Ajor
6. Banakar
7. Bangalipatti
8. Baniapur
9. Banropur
10. Basatpur
11. Batrauli
12. Bedauli
13. Bengali Bhithi
14. Berui
15. Bhagwanpur
16. Bhaiya Ramki Dhauri
17. Bhakura
18. Bhatwalia
19. Bhithi
20. Bhithi Bazar
21. Bhuidhara
22. Bhusanw
23. Bindra Patak
24. Chak pir
25. Chandpur
26. Chandpur Birt
27. Chhapia
28. Chhapia
29. Chhatwa Khurd
30. Chhatwan Kalan
31. Chhitauni
32. Chorauan
33. Darhibarhi
34. Darhibarhi
35. Dewalkha
36. Dhanawn
37. Dhanawn
38. Dhangaraha
39. Dhobwal
40. Dungurpatti
41. Goapipar Panti
42. Hafizpur
43. Hansrajpur Kalan
44. Hansrajpur Kalan Birti
45. Hansrajpur Khurd
46. Harakhpura
47. Hardew Tola
48. Hardi Tola
49. Hariharpur
50. Harpur
51. Harpur
52. Hunraraha Kalan
53. Hunraraha Khurd
54. Ibrahimpur
55. Jahangirpur
56. Kalhua
57. Kamta
58. Kanhauli Manohar
59. Kanhauli Sangram
60. Kanth Chhapra
61. Karah
62. Karahi
63. Katsa
64. Khabsa
65. Khabsi
66. Khalispur
67. Lauwa Kalan
68. Lutha Dhananw
69. Machhagra
70. Majhaulia
71. Majhaulia Kalan
72. Majhaulia Khurd
73. Manikpura
74. Manopali
75. Maricha
76. Menruka
77. Menruka
78. Menruka
79. Milkipur
80. Mirzapur
81. Muslimpur
82. Nadauan
83. Nagdiha
84. Najiba
85. Nandlal Tola
86. Pachmahla
87. Paighambarpur
88. Panrepur
89. Paterhia
90. Piarepur
91. Pindra
92. Pindra
93. Pipra
94. Pirari
95. Pirauta Khas Ghurahu
96. Pirauta Megha
97. Pithauri
98. Rajauli
99. Repura
100. Sarea
101. Sarea
102. Sarmi
103. Satua
104. Shekhpura
105. Shekhpura
106. Sihoria
107. Siripur
108. Siripur
109. Sisai
110. Suhai Gajan
111. Suhai Sahpur
112. Suraudha
113. Tola Tawakal Rai
114. Usti

== Chapra ==
1. Amar Chhapra
2. Anyay
3. Badalpura
4. Badalpura Diara
5. Badlutola
6. Bahoran Tola
7. Balgarha
8. Balua
9. Banathi
10. Bangra
11. Barhampur
12. Barhara Mahazi
13. Basarhi
14. Batani
15. Bazidpur
16. Bhairopur Aima
17. Bhairopur Nizamat
18. Bichla Telpa
19. Bichli Badhar
20. Bishunpura
21. Chak Haji
22. Chak Jamali
23. Chakia
24. Chhota madhopur
25. Chan Chaura
26. Chhuri Chhapra
27. Chirand
28. Daftarpur
29. Dahiawan
30. Dariyawganj
31. Dhanpat Chhapra
32. Dharampura
33. Dhusaria
34. Diara Singahi
35. Dumaria
36. Dumri
37. Ekauna
38. Gheghta
39. Gopalpur
40. Harnarayan Chhapra
41. Hasanpurwa
42. Ismailpur
43. Itahia
44. Jagdishpur
45. Jalalpur
46. Jalalpur
47. Jamuna
48. Jatia Bajidpur
49. Jatua
50. Kans Diar
51. Karinga
52. Khalpura Bala
53. Khalpura Kamala
54. Khawaspur
55. Khorodih
56. Khawaspur Khurd
57. Kotwapatti Rampur
58. Lodipur
59. Lodipur Diara
60. Lohra
61. Lohri
62. Madanipatti
63. Mahaji Dharhara
64. Mahaji Khalpura Bala
65. Mahaji Khalpura Kamala
66. Maharajganj
67. Makhdumganj
68. Mala Mirja Tukra II
69. Malamirza Tukra
70. Malasherpur
71. Mangaidih
72. Manupur Jahangir
73. Manupur Manjhan
74. Marahia
75. Mauna
76. Mehian
77. Mehrauli
78. Methwalia
79. Mira Musehri
80. Misraulia
81. Mohaddipur
82. Musehri
83. Musehri Mahto
84. Musepur
85. Naini
86. Nandlal Chhapra
87. Narayanpur
88. Nauadih
89. Panapur
90. Parsotim Chhapra
91. Phakuli
92. Phul Chak
93. Purbari Telpa
94. Qazipur
95. Raipur Bingawan
96. Rajaiya Tola
97. Ram Kolwa
98. Rasalpura
99. Ratanpura
100. Semaria Mahazi
101. Shankarpur Urf Kutubpur
102. Sherpur
103. Shukulpura
104. Sidhwalia
105. Singahi
106. Siram Chak
107. Sujan Chhapra
108. Taufir Maharajganj
109. Tejpurwa
110. Tenua
111. Todarpur
112. Turkaulia

== Dariapur ==
1. Admapur
2. Akbarpur I
3. Akbarpur II
4. Aqilpur
5. Bajahia
6. Bajaraha
7. Bali Chhapra
8. Baluahia
9. Banwaripur
10. Banwaripur
11. Banwaripur
12. Barka Banea
13. Barua
14. Barwa
15. Bedaulia
16. Bela
17. Belahar Janki
18. Belahar Pattu
19. Bhagwan Chak
20. Bhagwanpur
21. Bhagwanpur
22. Bhagwanpur
23. Bhairopur
24. Bhaw Chak
25. Bhetwalia
26. Bhopan Chak
27. Bisahi
28. Bisamharpur
29. Chak Akbarpur
30. Chak Banwaripur
31. Chak Han
32. Chak Hasan
33. Chak Jalal
34. Chak Khanpur Mahartha
35. Chak Nagwa Khurd Mahartha
36. Chak Ruddi
37. Chak Semrahiya Mahartha
38. Chandwa Chak
39. Chaubhaia
40. Chhotami
41. Chhotka Banea
42. Daluwa Chak
43. Darihara Bhual
44. Darihara Chaturbhuj
45. Darihara Nisakh
46. Dariyapur
47. Darwesha
48. Derni
49. Dewti
50. Dhanauti Sultanpur
51. DhanneChapra
52. Dhanuki
53. Dharam Chak
54. Dhongaha Fatuh
55. Dhongaha Inam
56. Diara Mahazi
57. Dumaria
58. Dumaria Sani
59. Edilpur
60. Faqir Chak
61. Fatehpur Chain
62. Fursatpur
63. Fursatpur
64. Garauna
65. Gariba Chak
66. Gay Ghat
67. Ghurhu Kothia
68. Gopalpur
69. Hakar Patti
70. Hardia Chak
71. Hariharpur
72. Hariharpur
73. Harna
74. Harpur
75. Hewantpur
76. Hingua
77. Hukraha
78. Hukrahi
79. Ibrahimpur
80. Inglish
81. Itwa
82. Jadopur
83. Jadurampur
84. Jaduwa Chak
85. Jagdish
86. Jagdishpur
87. Jaitipur
88. Jalalpur
89. Jamira
90. Jitwarpur
91. Joga Chak
92. Kakarahat
93. Kamalpur
94. Karam Chak
95. Karanpura
96. Kewatia
97. Khajauta
98. Khajuhta
99. Khanpur
100. Khirkia
101. Khojauli
102. Khushihal pur
103. Kishun Das
104. Koila
105. Konhwa
106. Kothia
107. Kothia
108. Kusiari
109. Kuwari
110. Lachhmanpur
111. Litiahi
112. Lohchha
113. Lohchha- Kapurtal
114. Mahammadpur
115. Mahammadpur
116. Mahesia
117. Mahesia
118. Malahi Chak
119. Malmala
120. Manchitwa
121. Mangarpal Murtuza
122. Mangarpal Nuran
123. Manika Chak
124. Manoharpur
125. Manpur
126. Manpur
127. Mansa Chak
128. Manupur
129. Masti Chak
130. Math Balgobinda
131. Math Kakara
132. Math Kewatia
133. Mathchelwa
134. Mohan Chak
135. Mohan Kothia
136. Mujauna
137. Mujauna Mahartha
138. Murar chak
139. Nagwa
140. Naso Chak
141. Natha Chhapra
142. Nawada
143. Nonphar
144. Panch Bhaia
145. Parsurampur
146. Partappur
147. Patti Sital
148. Piara Math
149. Pipra
150. Pirari
151. Pirari
152. Pitu Chak
153. Pojhi
154. Porai
155. Purdilpur
156. Purnadih
157. Rahimapur
158. Rajapur
159. Ramjitpur
160. Rampur
161. Rampur
162. Rampur Aanant
163. Rampur Jagdish
164. Ranipur
165. Rasulpur
166. Sadwara
167. Sahay Chak
168. Saidpur
169. Sajnupur Mathihan
170. Sakhnauli
171. Salempur
172. Salempur
173. Saman Chak
174. Samaspura
175. Sanjha
176. Sarae Muzaffar
177. Sarae Saho
178. Saraia
179. Sarari
180. Sarnarayan
181. Sarnath Chak
182. Semrahia
183. Shahar Chhapra
184. Sikandara
185. Sisauni
186. Sitalpur Chak Mahartha
187. Sultanpur
188. Sumerpatti
189. Sundarpur
190. Sutihar
191. Tapsia
192. Tinbhaia
193. Turki
194. Ubhwa
195. Yar Mohammadpur
196. Zaminpur

== Dighwara ==
1. Ahiman Patti
2. Akilpur
3. Ami
4. Anu CHak
5. Babhangawan
6. Baguraha
7. Baqarpur
8. Barua
9. Basti Jalal
10. Batrauli
11. Bishunpur
12. Bishunpur Mohan
13. Bodha Chhapra
14. Chatra
15. Dharipur
16. Dudhia
17. Fakuli
18. Goraipur
19. Haraji
20. Ismaila
21. Jaitipur
22. Jhaua
23. Kakaria
24. Kanakpur
25. Kesarpur
26. Kuraia
27. Malkha Chak
28. Manupur
29. Mathurapur
30. Milki
31. Nizama Chak
32. Pakaulia
33. Pakauliya
34. Parsotimpur
35. Parsotimpur
36. Pharhada
37. Pipra Salehpur
38. Ramdas Chak
39. Rampur Ami
40. Salhadi
41. Sitalpur
42. Sobarna
43. Tilok Chak
44. Una Chak
45. Yusufpur
46. Yusufpur

== Ekma ==
1. Amdarhi
2. Asahni
3. Atarsan
4. Athdila
5. Bahuwara
6. Bal
7. Baliya
8. Banpura
9. Banpura
10. Bansi Chhapra
11. Banwari Amnaur
12. Basantpur
13. Be. Chhapri
14. Bedupur
15. Benaut
16. Betuania (Batbaniya)
17. Bharhopur
18. Bhodsa
19. Bishunpura Kalan
20. Bishunpura Khurd
21. Chak Islam
22. Chak Mira
23. Chan Chaura
24. Chanrwa(Chandchaura)
25. Chapraitha
26. Chapraithi
27. Chhapia
28. Chhitraulia
29. Dewpura
30. Dhana Dih
31. Dhana Dih
32. Dhanauti
33. Dohar
34. Ekari
35. Ekma
36. Eksar
37. Galimanpur
38. Gangwa
39. Gauspur
40. Ghaziapur
41. Hakam
42. Hansrajpur
43. Hanumanganj
44. Harpur
45. Husepur
46. Ithari
47. Jamanpura
48. Jamni Amnaur
49. Jogia
50. Karanpura
51. Khajuhan
52. Kosari
53. Laguni
54. Lakat Chhapra
55. Lalpur Mathia
56. Langra
57. Lauwari
58. Madhopur
59. Makundpur
60. Mani
61. Mani Chhapra
62. Manikpur
63. Mathia
64. Nagra
65. Nagra Basantpur
66. Nautan
67. Nawada
68. Pachua
69. Panre Chhapra
70. Panre ke Bhuin
71. Parsa
72. Phuchti Kalan
73. Phuchti Khurd
74. Rajapur
75. Rampur
76. Rampur
77. Rasulpur
78. Rith
79. Safari
80. Sasna
81. Senduar
82. Siuri
83. Siuri
84. Sobhan Chhapra
85. Soraunu
86. Tarwania
87. Telia Dih
88. Tesuar
89. Tiwari Chhapra
90. Tola Doman Rai
91. Tola Madhopur
92. Tola Rampur
93. Tola Ranglal
