= Sara Naeini =

Iranian singer and songwriter

- Born: July 13, 1981 (age 45); Shiraz, Iran
- Instrument: Vocals

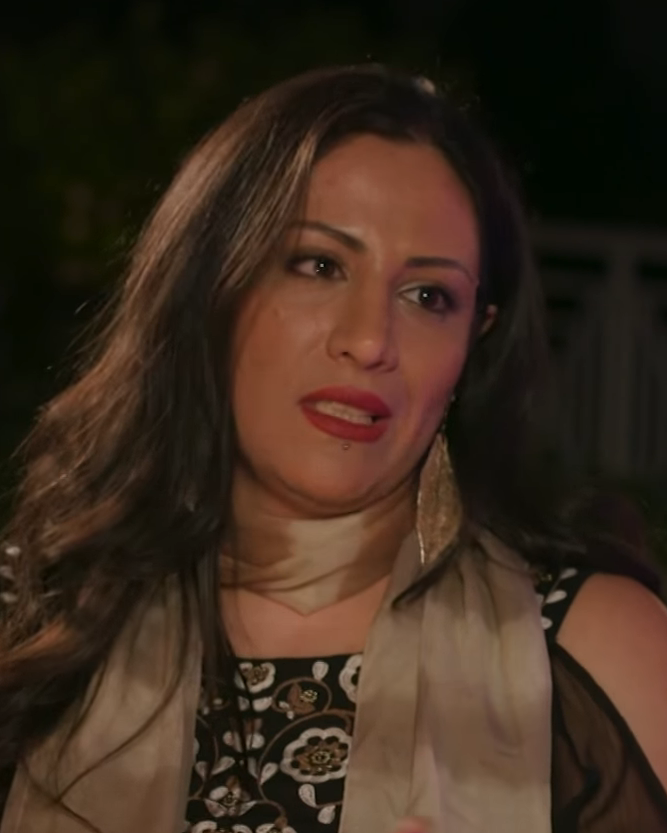
Sara Naeini

Sara Naeini (Persian: سارا نائینی, Shiraz, Iran) is an Iranian singer and songwriter.

== Biography ==
Sara Naeini was born on July 23, 1981, in Shiraz. She inherited her musical abilities from her mother, Hoorvash Khalili, who is an Iranian singer and songwriter. She has had her first concert in 1999. Sara Naeini currently teaches music and holds a bachelor's degree in graphic design from Shariaty Technical College for girls in Tehran. She was a successful gymnast but had to discontinue her gymnastics career due to a neck injury.

Naeini's concerts attracted sanctions from the Ministry of Culture and Islamic Guidance of Iran, which forbade her to practice singing, and consequently Naeini left Iran.

Throughout her career, she has worked with various artists such as Alireza Assar, Mohammad Esfahani, Homayoun Shajarian, and Arash Fouladvand.
