= Gangi, Kishanganj district =

Village in Kishanganj, Bihar, India

Gangi is a village in Kishanganj district in the Indian state of Bihar.
