= List of villages in Sitamarhi =

This is the list of villages in Sitamarhi district of Bihar, India

C.D.Block-wise list of census villages in Sitamarhi district, Bihar, India

| Sl No | C.D.Block | Total Villages |
|---|---|---|
| 1 | Bairgania | 24 |
| 2 | Bajpatti | 58 |
| 3 | Bathnaha | 90 |
| 4 | Belsand | 39 |
| 5 | Bokhara | 28 |
| 6 | Charaut | 17 |
| 7 | Dumra | 78 |
| 8 | Majorganj | 27 |
| 9 | Nanpur | 32 |
| 10 | Parihar | 83 |
| 11 | Parsauni | 22 |
| 12 | Pupri | 46 |
| 13 | Riga | 42 |
| 14 | Runisaidpur | 102 |
| 15 | Sonbarsa | 64 |
| 16 | Suppi | 37 |
| 17 | Sursand | 53 |

== Villages in Bairgania C.D.Block ==
| Sl No | Village Name | Village Code |
|---|---|---|
| 1 | Akhta | 218984 |
| 2 | Bairgania (NP) | 801293 |
| 3 | Bakhri | 218979 |
| 4 | Barahi | 218977 |
| 5 | Belganj | 218975 |
| 6 | Bengahi | 218983 |
| 7 | Bhataulia | 218980 |
| 8 | Jamua | 218989 |
| 9 | Joriahi Kothia | 218981 |
| 10 | Joriahi Sahapat | 218982 |
| 11 | Kurwa Fatehpur Chhapra | 218988 |
| 12 | Madhu Chapra | 218990 |
| 13 | Marpa Tahir | 218991 |
| 14 | Masha Alam | 218973 |
| 15 | Masha Naoratan | 218972 |
| 16 | Nandwara | 218974 |
| 17 | Pachtaki Jadu | 218978 |
| 18 | Pachtaki Ram | 218976 |
| 19 | Parsauni | 218985 |
| 20 | Patahi | 218987 |
| 21 | Piprahi Jamalpur | 218993 |
| 22 | Piprahi Sultanpur | 218992 |
| 23 | Rasulpur Dayal urf Bahira | 218986 |
| 24 | Rasulpur Rambhadar urf Chlk | 218971 |

== Villages in Bajpatti C.D.Block ==
| Sl No | Village Name | Village Code |
|---|---|---|
| 1 | Arazi Rakbe Bangaon | 219656 |
| 2 | Baburban | 219661 |
| 3 | Bajoapatti Narha | 219641 |
| 4 | Bakhri Yusufpur | 219658 |
| 5 | Balha Manorath | 219635 |
| 6 | Bangraha urf Mahindpur | 219650 |
| 7 | Baragaon | 219657 |
| 8 | Barharwa Hasanpur | 219672 |
| 9 | Bari Phulwaria | 219648 |
| 10 | Basantpur | 219638 |
| 11 | Basaul | 219649 |
| 12 | Basdeopur | 219633 |
| 13 | Bazidpur | 219628 |
| 14 | Bazpatti Abidpur | 219660 |
| 15 | Belahia | 219673 |
| 16 | Bhagwanpur Chaube | 219654 |
| 17 | Bhasopur | 219675 |
| 18 | Bhelni Madan | 219681 |
| 19 | Bhikaha | 219630 |
| 20 | Bishunpur Ratwara | 219676 |
| 21 | Boha Basdeopur | 219679 |
| 22 | Chak Saura | 219680 |
| 23 | Darhi Keshopur | 219666 |
| 24 | Debipur | 219677 |
| 25 | Dhankaul Buzurg | 219655 |
| 26 | Gopalpur | 219669 |
| 27 | Gorar | 219683 |
| 28 | Harpurwa | 219653 |
| 29 | Humayupur | 219664 |
| 30 | Loknathpur | 219665 |
| 31 | Madaripur Sirimanpur | 219663 |
| 32 | Madhopur Chaturi | 219678 |
| 33 | Madhuban Basaha | 219652 |
| 34 | Madhubani | 219674 |
| 35 | Madhurapur | 219644 |
| 36 | Mahamadpur | 219642 |
| 37 | Mahamadpur urf Sherpur | 219639 |
| 38 | Mirzapur | 219685 |
| 39 | Mohuain | 219631 |
| 40 | Moraul | 219668 |
| 41 | Narha Kalyan | 219632 |
| 42 | Narharpur | 219651 |
| 43 | Pachra Nimahi | 219640 |
| 44 | Paharpur | 219670 |
| 45 | Patdeora | 219629 |
| 46 | Pathanpura urf Manikpur | 219659 |
| 47 | Pathrahi urf Shahzadpur | 219643 |
| 48 | Pharuha Bhawani | 219637 |
| 49 | Piprarhi | 219636 |
| 50 | Raepur Jagarnath | 219647 |
| 51 | Raghunathpur | 219671 |
| 52 | Rasulpur | 219634 |
| 53 | Ratanpur | |

== Villages in Runisaidpur C.D. Block ==
| Sl No | Village Name | Village Code |
|---|---|---|
| 1 | Tilaktajpur | |
