= Dheng =

Dheng Formally "Dhang"
- Village
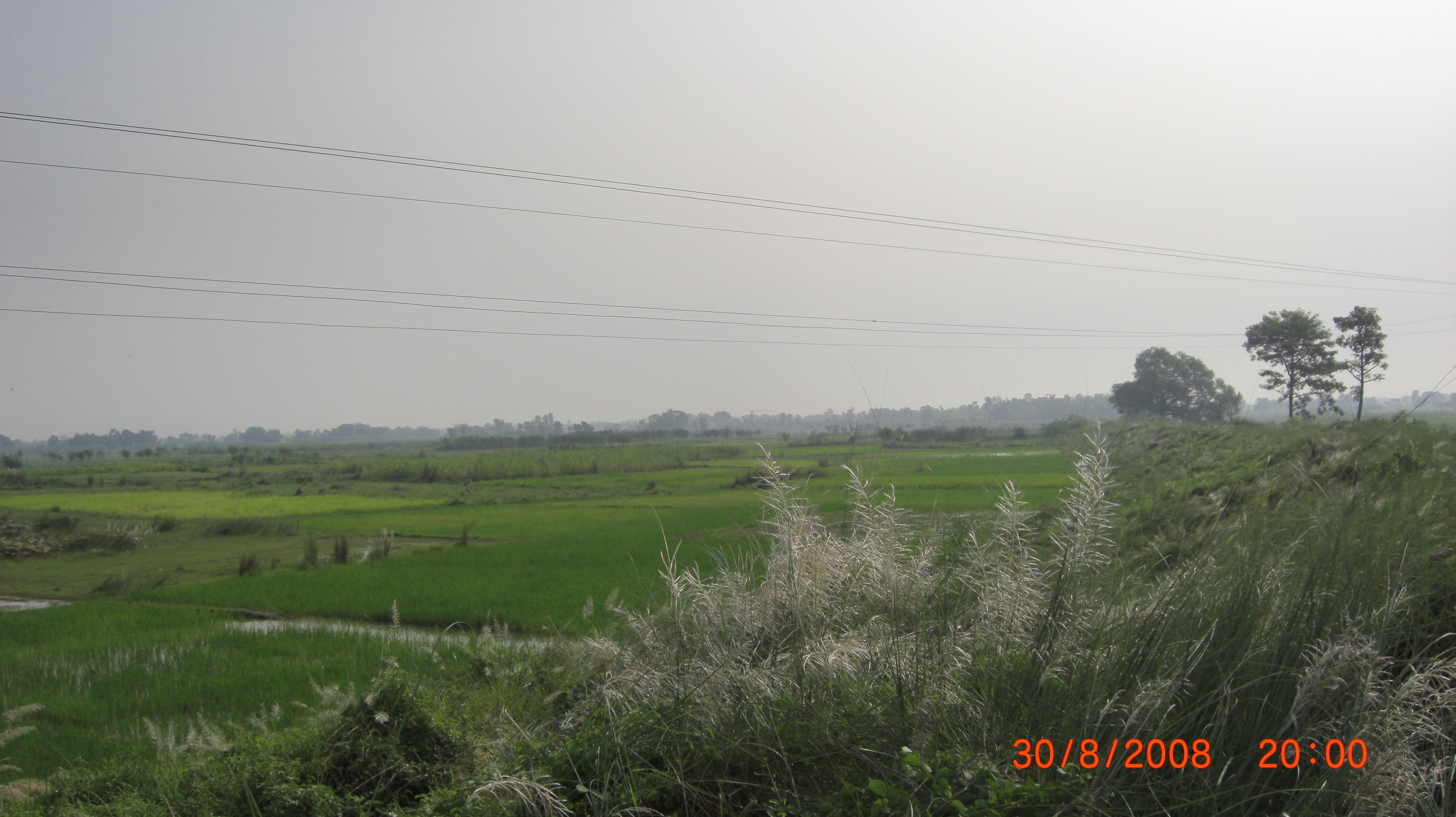
- View towards west from Bagmati Bandh

- Location in Bihar, India Dheng (India)
- Coordinates: 26.72°N 85.33°E
- Country: India
- State: Bihar
- District: Sitamarhi
- Block: Suppi

Languages
  - Official: Maithili, Hindi, Bajjika
- Time zone: UTC+5:30 (IST)
- PIN: 843315
- Telephone code: (91)6226
- ISO 3166 code: IN-BR
- Nearest Town: Sitamarhi
- Lok Sabha: Sheohar
- Vidhan Sabha: Riga-23

Dheng is a village in the Mithila region of Bihar, India. It is situated 24 km west of Sitamarhi on the bank of the Bagmati River, which is connected to the rest of the district center via broad-gauge rail network. It has: at the east side, the Maniyari and Vasant Gachhi Tola; to the west side, Bel, Bengahi & Adamwan; to the north side is Nepal and Jamla; and to the south is Gamhariya & Kharahia tola.

== Geographics ==
The average height of village from sea level is 75 Meters. There are four temples in the village, two of which are devoted to Lord Krishna , Hanuman & Lord Shankar

Dheng is the north-most village of India on the border with Nepal. It happens to be the junction of Sitamarhi-Bairgania road link because river Bagmati which flows through the village separates these two towns. Incumbent Chief Minister of Bihar, Nitish Kumar inaugurated Baghmati road bridge called Banshi-Setu on 12 July 2010. This bridge named after Banshi Shah who sacrificed his life on 20 November 1997 in the process of putting demand of this very bridge in front of Bihar government. Prior to this, boat was the only source to cross the river for four-wheeler vehicles.

== Popular life ==
Most of the people are involved in Agriculture and Animal husbandry. Literacy rate of the village is quite low. There are now many primary schools and a high school in Suppi. The absence of secondary level small scale industry is main cause of poverty and unemployment of the village. A large number of youths works in Delhi, Kolkata and Punjab as migrant labours.

== Communication ==
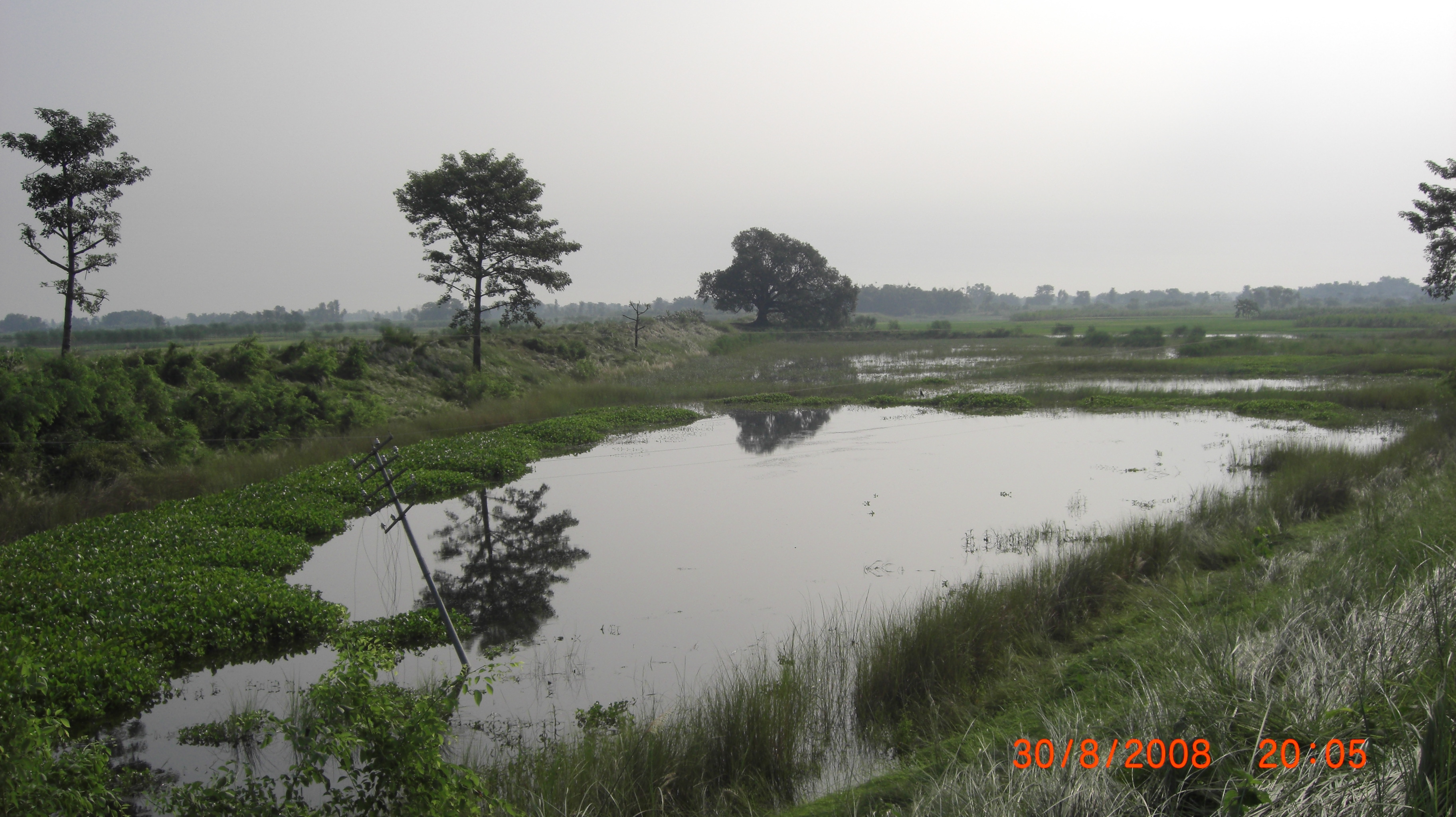
View towards north-east from Baghmati Bandh

Dheng is connected to phone and electricity. The postal code is 843315 and telephone code is (+91)6226. Reliance Jio, BSNL and Airtel are the available mobile service providers. The official homepage of Dheng can be found on following link. This was one of the most flood prone villages of Sitamarhi back then but the problem no longer persists now. In older days Dheng Railway Station was situated in this village but later, because of problems with frequent floods, the station was moved to a nearby village called Barharwa, which is one and half kilometer away from the center of the village. The electrification of dheng railway station was fully completed in 2021.
