= List of villages in Zalun Township =

This is a list of villages in Zalun Township, Hinthada District, Ayeyarwady Region, Burma (Myanmar).

Village	Village code	Village tract	Coordinates (links to map & photo sources)	Notes
Kan Nar Tan	156524	La Maing	17.4698°N 95.5766°E	
Daik Inn	156528	La Maing	17.4678°N 95.5614°E	
Ein Gyi Su	156527	La Maing	17.474°N 95.5702°E	
Lay Ein Tan	156526	La Maing	17.4703°N 95.5698°E	
Ta Dar U (North)	156525	La Maing	17.4686°N 95.5717°E	
U Yin	156523	La Maing	17.4624°N 95.5798°E	
Ta Dar U (South)	156522	La Maing		
La Maing	156521	La Maing	17.4716°N 95.5727°E	
Daw Wa Sein Su	161560	Tha Hpan Kone	17.4456°N 95.5802°E	
U Yin	161557	Tha Hpan Kone	17.4608°N 95.5796°E	
Kan Nar Tan	161559	Tha Hpan Kone		
Tha Pyu Kwin	161556	Tha Hpan Kone		
Sin Aing (Middle)	161561	Tha Hpan Kone		
Sin Aing (East)	161562	Tha Hpan Kone		
Shan Su	161558	Tha Hpan Kone		
Sat Aing	161555	Tha Hpan Kone	17.4405°N 95.576°E	
Tar Gyi Kone	161554	Tha Hpan Kone		
Tha Hpan Kone	161553	Tha Hpan Kone	17.4527°N 95.5871°E	
Kyaung Kwin	157353	Ma Yoe Kha		
Tha Pyu Kwin	157354	Ma Yoe Kha		
Ma Yoe Kha	157349	Ma Yoe Kha	17.4465°N 95.6052°E	
Yae Le Lay	157352	Ma Yoe Kha	17.4384°N 95.6067°E	
Yae Le Gyi	157351	Ma Yoe Kha	17.4424°N 95.6019°E	
Nyaung Kone	157350	Ma Yoe Kha		
Yae Pauk Gyi	158600	Nyaung Pin Thar	17.4472°N 95.6452°E	
Baw Thun	158601	Nyaung Pin Thar	17.4242°N 95.6178°E	
Ka Dit	158602	Nyaung Pin Thar	17.4386°N 95.6241°E	
Shan Su	158603	Nyaung Pin Thar	17.444°N 95.6129°E	
Nyaung Pin Thar	158599	Nyaung Pin Thar	17.4427°N 95.6215°E	
Pa Kwe Ywar Ma	158928	Pa Kwe	17.4213°N 95.6148°E	
Pa Kwe (West)	158929	Pa Kwe	17.4164°N 95.6107°E	
Khin Min Kone	158930	Pa Kwe	17.4182°N 95.6031°E	
Sit Kone	158931	Pa Kwe	17.4117°N 95.5863°E	
Chan Gyi Ywar Thit	158932	Pa Kwe	17.4312°N 95.5894°E	
Pa Kwe (North)	158939	Pa Kwe	17.4275°N 95.6097°E	
Yae Le Chaung	158933	Pa Kwe	17.4148°N 95.5789°E	
Pa Kwe (East)	158937	Pa Kwe	17.4246°N 95.6117°E	
Ohn Taw	158938	Pa Kwe	17.43°N 95.6082°E	
Kyaung Kwin	158936	Pa Kwe	17.4371°N 95.5932°E	
Taung Yar Lay	158934	Pa Kwe	17.4236°N 95.5825°E	
Pyay Taw Thar	158935	Pa Kwe	17.4288°N 95.6081°E	
Chan Tan	158944	Pa Kwe Yae Le	17.4308°N 95.6161°E	
Pa Kwe Yae Le	158940	Pa Kwe Yae Le	17.4305°N 95.6114°E	
Shan Kone	158941	Pa Kwe Yae Le		
Pauk Kone	158942	Pa Kwe Yae Le	17.4224°N 95.6402°E	
Sar Kyet Kone	158943	Pa Kwe Yae Le	17.4299°N 95.6254°E	
Yae Le	163287	Yae Le	17.4797°N 95.6631°E	
Paing Kyon	163289	Yae Le	17.4951°N 95.6345°E	
Ma Nyein Kone	163290	Yae Le	17.4779°N 95.6206°E	
U Htu Kyun	163291	Yae Le	17.4733°N 95.6292°E	
Daw Chu Kone	163292	Yae Le	17.4792°N 95.6284°E	
Kan Gyi Su	163288	Yae Le	17.4901°N 95.6421°E	
Ah Lel su	156320	Kywa Man	17.4472°N 95.5616°E	
U Bo Tin Ah Su	156319	Kywa Man	17.4486°N 95.5654°E	
Kyu Taw	156317	Kywa Man	17.4426°N 95.5724°E	
Kywa Man (Auk Su)	156316	Kywa Man	17.442°N 95.563°E	
U Shwe Lel	156318	Kywa Man	17.4472°N 95.5572°E	
Wet Kone	157960	Myit Wa	17.501°N 95.6102°E	
Nyaung Kone	157961	Myit Wa	17.4986°N 95.6305°E	
Htan Ta Pin	157959	Myit Wa	17.5054°N 95.6236°E	
Myit Wa	157958	Myit Wa	17.5046°N 95.6061°E	
Sar Kyet Kone	157963	Myit Wa	17.515°N 95.6231°E	
Sa Lun Kone	157962	Myit Wa	17.5102°N 95.6226°E	
Htan Pin Chaung	158048	Nan Taw Kyun		
Hnget Pyaw Taw	158049	Nan Taw Kyun	17.4866°N 95.5934°E	
Yae Lel Thaung	158047	Nan Taw Kyun	17.4755°N 95.5915°E	
Aye	158046	Nan Taw Kyun	17.5124°N 95.5723°E	
Ywar Kant Lant	158045	Nan Taw Kyun		
Nan Taw Kyun	158044	Nan Taw Kyun	17.5076°N 95.5826°E	
Da Yat Kone	163510	Yae Twin Kone	17.5218°N 95.6267°E	
Yae Twin Kone	163509	Yae Twin Kone	17.5191°N 95.6103°E	
Ba Lwe	163511	Yae Twin Kone	17.5307°N 95.6128°E	
Myauk Chaw Kone	156675	Lay Tu (East)	17.4945°N 95.7208°E	
Pat Taw	156676	Lay Tu (East)	17.5183°N 95.7129°E	
Kaing Shoke	156677	Lay Tu (East)	17.5008°N 95.7152°E	
Lay Tu	156673	Lay Tu (East)	17.4912°N 95.7237°E	
Lay Kun Su	156674	Lay Tu (East)	17.5052°N 95.7139°E	
U To	156678	Lay Tu (East)	17.5107°N 95.7129°E	
Kyun Pu Lu	152871	Htone Ta Po	17.4718°N 95.6534°E	
Htone Ta Po (Ah Htet)	152869	Htone Ta Po	17.4744°N 95.6709°E	
Htone Ta Po (Auk)	152868	Htone Ta Po	17.4684°N 95.6773°E	
Htone Ta Po (Auk Su)	152870	Htone Ta Po	17.4683°N 95.6773°E	
Chaung Gyi (Auk)	152872	Htone Ta Po	17.4511°N 95.6894°E	
Chaung Gyi (Ah Htet)	152873	Htone Ta Po	17.4575°N 95.6849°E	
Zin Pyun Kone	158863	Oke Shit Kwin	17.4176°N 95.5159°E	
Yoe Gyi	158862	Oke Shit Kwin	17.4172°N 95.5046°E	
Taung Su Gyi	158866	Oke Shit Kwin		
Sit Kwin	158867	Oke Shit Kwin		
Chan Tan Ywar Ma	158868	Oke Shit Kwin		
Taung Su Lay	158869	Oke Shit Kwin		
Tha Yet Kone	158861	Oke Shit Kwin		
Kawt Sein Ywar Haung	158864	Oke Shit Kwin		
Oke Shit Kwin	158860	Oke Shit Kwin	17.4338°N 95.526°E	
Kawt Sein Ywar Thit	158865	Oke Shit Kwin		
Ah Nyar Su	161933	Tha Yet Ta Pin (North)	17.4477°N 95.5062°E	
Nyaung Kone (Auk Su)	161934	Tha Yet Ta Pin (North)	17.4452°N 95.4866°E	
Tha Yet Ta Pin (North)	161930	Tha Yet Ta Pin (North)	17.4585°N 95.5102°E	
Nyaung Kone Ywar Ma	161931	Tha Yet Ta Pin (North)	17.4492°N 95.4886°E	
Kyaung Su	161932	Tha Yet Ta Pin (North)	17.4525°N 95.5058°E	
Kan Gyi Su	161942	Tha Yet Ta Pin (South)	17.4554°N 95.5198°E	
Sin Kone	161940	Tha Yet Ta Pin (South)	17.4338°N 95.5142°E	
Kyat Gyi	161938	Tha Yet Ta Pin (South)	17.452°N 95.5332°E	
Ohn Pin Su	161939	Tha Yet Ta Pin (South)	17.4409°N 95.5101°E	
Tha Yet Ta Pin (South)	161935	Tha Yet Ta Pin (South)	17.4505°N 95.5162°E	
Oke Shit Kone (North)	161936	Tha Yet Ta Pin (South)	17.4397°N 95.5217°E	
Ta Man	161937	Tha Yet Ta Pin (South)	17.4542°N 95.5119°E	
Sin Kone Lay	161941	Tha Yet Ta Pin (South)	17.4371°N 95.5123°E	
Auk Kyin Su	161943	Tha Yet Ta Pin (South)	17.4374°N 95.5032°E	
Nga Pyay Ma Ga Yet	156747	Lein Kone	17.4608°N 95.4851°E	
Lein Kone	156738	Lein Kone	17.4743°N 95.4888°E	
Ohn Kone	156739	Lein Kone	17.4725°N 95.4999°E	
Nyaung Kone Kyaung Su	156746	Lein Kone	17.4563°N 95.488°E	
Nga Pyay Ma Kone	156745	Lein Kone	17.4644°N 95.4849°E	
Pi Tauk Kone	156744	Lein Kone	17.4608°N 95.5072°E	
Htauk Shar Kwin	156743	Lein Kone	17.467°N 95.5046°E	
Gway Kone	156742	Lein Kone	17.4714°N 95.5086°E	
Sein Hne Su	156741	Lein Kone		
Tha Yaw Ta Pon	156740	Lein Kone	17.4666°N 95.5125°E	
Ah Shoke Kwin	150299	Ah Shoke Kwin	17.4778°N 95.532°E	
Maung Htaung	150300	Ah Shoke Kwin	17.4771°N 95.5244°E	
Nan Ku Lar (Ah Lel Su)	163633	Yin Ma Lut	17.4429°N 95.5339°E	
Nan Ku Lar (Taung Su)	163632	Yin Ma Lut	17.4401°N 95.5346°E	
Nan Ku Lar (Kone Su)	163634	Yin Ma Lut	17.4465°N 95.5362°E	
Di Poe Aing	163635	Yin Ma Lut	17.4368°N 95.5334°E	
Kyat Gyi	163636	Yin Ma Lut	17.4502°N 95.5343°E	
Pauk Pin Kwin	163637	Yin Ma Lut	17.4541°N 95.5449°E	
Kyaung su	163638	Yin Ma Lut	17.4283°N 95.5353°E	
Myauk Su	163639	Yin Ma Lut	17.4354°N 95.5474°E	
Nyaung Pin Ywar Thit	163640	Yin Ma Lut	17.4263°N 95.5503°E	
Ka Nyin Kwin	163641	Yin Ma Lut	17.4295°N 95.5428°E	
Yin Ma Lut	163631	Yin Ma Lut	17.4295°N 95.5478°E	
Byin Nyar (Ah Lel Su)	151030	Byin Nyar	17.4808°N 95.5447°E	
Byin Nyar (Ah Shey Su)	151031	Byin Nyar	17.4831°N 95.5483°E	
Auk Kyin Su	151032	Byin Nyar	17.4767°N 95.5437°E	
Ka Nyin Kwin Chan Tan	151815	GyanTaik		
Hpa Yar Gyi Su	151814	GyanTaik	17.4274°N 95.5394°E	
Ywar Thit Gyi	151811	GyanTaik		
Ah Shey Zin Pyun Kone	151812	GyanTaik	17.4045°N 95.5325°E	
Shwe Chaung	151804	GyanTaik	17.4112°N 95.527°E	
Gyan Taik	151803	GyanTaik	17.4225°N 95.5433°E	
Tha Yet Taw Yoe	151805	GyanTaik	17.4136°N 95.5399°E	
Taw Gyi	151806	GyanTaik		
Ah Lel Su	151813	GyanTaik	17.4198°N 95.5351°E	
Taik Gyi Su	151810	GyanTaik	17.4151°N 95.5271°E	
Chan Tan	151809	GyanTaik	17.4192°N 95.5277°E	
Shwe Taung Su	151808	GyanTaik	17.4239°N 95.5414°E	
Ka Nyin Kwin Taw Tan	151807	GyanTaik		
Kyun Taw	154143	Kawt Sein	17.3914°N 95.5051°E	
Kawt Sein (South)	154142	Kawt Sein	17.4142°N 95.5161°E	
Kawt Sein (North)	154141	Kawt Sein	17.4194°N 95.5181°E	
Moke Taw	154145	Kawt Sein	17.3937°N 95.5229°E	
Tha Pyay Hla	154152	Kawt Sein	17.3897°N 95.5181°E	
Kyaung Aing	154150	Kawt Sein	17.3868°N 95.5167°E	
Shwe Chaung	154144	Kawt Sein	17.4085°N 95.5272°E	
Yone Min Kaing	154151	Kawt Sein	17.4095°N 95.5077°E	
Ngar Ein Tan	154153	Kawt Sein	17.4019°N 95.5249°E	
Yone Chaung	154147	Kawt Sein		
Taw Gyi (North)	154148	Kawt Sein	17.4031°N 95.5378°E	
Taw Gyi (South)	154149	Kawt Sein	17.3997°N 95.5429°E	
Paing Saw Nan	154146	Kawt Sein	17.3845°N 95.522°E	
Ywar Thit Kone	154134	Kawt Kat Gyi		
Za Loke Gyi	154135	Kawt Kat Gyi	17.399°N 95.4883°E	
Kawt Kat Gyi	154133	Kawt Kat Gyi	17.3975°N 95.482°E	
Kawt Kat Kha Lay	154136	Kawt Kat Kha Lay	17.407°N 95.4712°E	
Aing Se	154137	Kawt Kat Kha Lay	17.4321°N 95.4674°E	
Ka Nyin Chaung	154139	Kawt Kat Kha Lay	17.432°N 95.4806°E	
Kyar Ku	154140	Kawt Kat Kha Lay	17.4276°N 95.4886°E	
Aing Pan Yar	154138	Kawt Kat Kha Lay	17.4265°N 95.4861°E	
Khe Paung	155761	Kyon Kawt	17.4011°N 95.4795°E	
Aing Sa Lun	155760	Kyon Kawt	17.4065°N 95.4626°E	
Sin Lan	155759	Kyon Kawt	17.3954°N 95.472°E	
Kyon Kawt	155758	Kyon Kawt	17.4051°N 95.4774°E	
Ohn Pin su	159402	Pet Tan	17.4251°N 95.4348°E	
Tin Koke Su	159394	Pet Tan	17.4303°N 95.4413°E	
Ta Loke Yoe	159400	Pet Tan	17.4429°N 95.4284°E	
Thin Gan Pin	159399	Pet Tan	17.4483°N 95.4523°E	
Pan Na Yar	159398	Pet Tan	17.4529°N 95.4437°E	
Pauk Kone	159397	Pet Tan	17.4493°N 95.4338°E	
Ywar Thit Kone	159396	Pet Tan	17.4394°N 95.4309°E	
Mi Chaung Kone	159395	Pet Tan	17.4343°N 95.4316°E	
Pet Tan	159393	Pet Tan	17.4209°N 95.4317°E	
Sin Lu Ywar Thit	159401	Pet Tan	17.4167°N 95.4319°E	
Nyaung Kone	159403	Pet Tan	17.4312°N 95.4318°E	
Ma Har Thar (East)	157152	Ma Har Thar	17.4115°N 95.4578°E	
Nat Sin Daunt	157154	Ma Har Thar	17.4162°N 95.444°E	
War Chaung	157157	Ma Har Thar	17.4026°N 95.4458°E	
Ma Har Thar Gyi	157150	Ma Har Thar	17.4099°N 95.4477°E	
Ywar Thit	157156	Ma Har Thar	17.4127°N 95.4457°E	
Ma Har Thar (West)	157155	Ma Har Thar	17.4133°N 95.4479°E	
Kawt Che	157153	Ma Har Thar	17.4425°N 95.4668°E	
Ma Har Thar Lat	157151	Ma Har Thar	17.4102°N 95.4571°E	
Pauk Kone	159672	Pyin Wa	17.3869°N 95.4581°E	
Pyit Se	159675	Pyin Wa	17.4072°N 95.45°E	
Sin Lan	159671	Pyin Wa	17.3925°N 95.4703°E	
Pyin	159669	Pyin Wa	17.3873°N 95.4672°E	
Tha Yet Chaung	159673	Pyin Wa	17.4022°N 95.4515°E	
Kyon Pa Toke	159674	Pyin Wa	17.4004°N 95.4464°E	
Pyay Taw Thar	159670	Pyin Wa		
Ta Khun Taing (South)	160856	Ta Khun Taing	17.4106°N 95.4349°E	
Ywar Thit	160857	Ta Khun Taing	17.4135°N 95.4435°E	
Ta Khun Taing (North)	160855	Ta Khun Taing	17.4159°N 95.4407°E	
Ka Nyin Yoe	160858	Ta Khun Taing		
Tha Man Kone	160596	Sin Myay Sar	17.4047°N 95.4274°E	
Sin Myay Sar	160594	Sin Myay Sar	17.3973°N 95.4197°E	
Kyon Pa Toke	160598	Sin Myay Sar	17.3985°N 95.4418°E	
Kun Chan	160597	Sin Myay Sar		
Tha Yet Kone	160595	Sin Myay Sar		
War Pa Taw	163016	War Pa Taw	17.3903°N 95.4754°E	
Sa Bai Kone	163017	War Pa Taw	17.3773°N 95.489°E	
War Yon Kauk	163018	War Pa Taw		
Wet Lar	163019	War Pa Taw	17.3843°N 95.4994°E	
Min Da Yei	157631	Min Da Yei	17.4408°N 95.4147°E	
Ta Loke Yoe	157632	Min Da Yei	17.443°N 95.4257°E	
Kyar Aing	157633	Min Da Yei	17.4561°N 95.4163°E	
Tha Pyu	162103	Thar Du Chaung	17.5846°N 95.6233°E	
Ohn Hne Chaung	162101	Thar Du Chaung	17.5897°N 95.5974°E	
Ga Naing Kone	162100	Thar Du Chaung	17.5764°N 95.6175°E	
Gon Nyin Tan	162099	Thar Du Chaung	17.5722°N 95.6062°E	
Byeit Zin Kone Gyi	162098	Thar Du Chaung	17.5718°N 95.5908°E	
Hpoe Ka Nan Tone	162097	Thar Du Chaung		
Tar Gyi Tan	162104	Thar Du Chaung		
Min Khan Chaung	162095	Thar Du Chaung		
Nyein Aye Thi Tar	162102	Thar Du Chaung	17.5888°N 95.6109°E	
Taw Ya Kone	162094	Thar Du Chaung	17.6146°N 95.5917°E	
Ma Au Chaung	162093	Thar Du Chaung	17.5809°N 95.6002°E	
Da Nu Chaung	162092	Thar Du Chaung	17.5932°N 95.6033°E	
Pein Taw Ma	162091	Thar Du Chaung	17.5815°N 95.6078°E	
Yoe Taw (Myauk Su)	162090	Thar Du Chaung	17.5662°N 95.5847°E	
Thar Du Chaung	162089	Thar Du Chaung	17.6059°N 95.5892°E	
Byeit Zin Kone Lay	162096	Thar Du Chaung	17.5692°N 95.5918°E	
Pauk Kone	162106	Thar Du Chaung		
Nyan Paw Aing	162107	Thar Du Chaung	17.5837°N 95.5949°E	
Gon Nyin Tan Kyaung Su	162108	Thar Du Chaung	17.5744°N 95.6034°E	
Ka Law Kone	162105	Thar Du Chaung	17.5697°N 95.6227°E	
Gauk Inn	162109	Thar Du Chaung	17.5959°N 95.5956°E	
Aye (Myauk Su)	154629	Ku Toet Seik	17.5154°N 95.5709°E	
Gwet Gyi	154630	Ku Toet Seik	17.5252°N 95.5761°E	
Htone Hput	154628	Ku Toet Seik	17.5416°N 95.5744°E	
Ngar Ein Tan	154627	Ku Toet Seik	17.5321°N 95.5674°E	
Hnit Ein Tan	154626	Ku Toet Seik	17.5454°N 95.5676°E	
Ku Toet Seik	154625	Ku Toet Seik	17.5371°N 95.5656°E	
Thet Kei Kyun	158688	Nyein Aye		
Hpa Yar Kone	158682	Nyein Aye	17.5433°N 95.6404°E	
Tha Yet Kone	158681	Nyein Aye	17.5481°N 95.6447°E	
Kyon Kyaik	158680	Nyein Aye	17.5191°N 95.6576°E	
Byea Gyi	158679	Nyein Aye	17.5111°N 95.6306°E	
Let Pan To	158678	Nyein Aye	17.5185°N 95.6449°E	
Hmat Taing	158685	Nyein Aye	17.5136°N 95.6397°E	
Pay Kone	158689	Nyein Aye	17.5341°N 95.649°E	
Ywar Thit	158686	Nyein Aye	17.5477°N 95.6374°E	
Nyein Aye	158677	Nyein Aye	17.5382°N 95.6327°E	
U Yin Kone	158684	Nyein Aye	17.5405°N 95.648°E	
Ga Mone Su	158683	Nyein Aye	17.5522°N 95.6479°E	
Hpa Yar Ngoke To	158687	Nyein Aye	17.5283°N 95.6479°E	
Yin Taik Kone	160709	Son Kone	17.5932°N 95.6455°E	
Inn Khwet	160705	Son Kone	17.5831°N 95.6273°E	
U To	160706	Son Kone	17.5606°N 95.6374°E	
Son Kone (Ah Htet Su)	160703	Son Kone	17.5708°N 95.6305°E	
Hmo Tan	160707	Son Kone	17.5767°N 95.6311°E	
Inn Lel Su	160708	Son Kone	17.5807°N 95.6305°E	
Sone Kone (Auk Su)	160704	Son Kone	17.5671°N 95.633°E	
Lay Thar Kone	150109	Ah Htut	17.5631°N 95.6276°E	
Yone Taw (Taung Su)	150104	Ah Htut	17.5616°N 95.5873°E	
Mee Thway Kone (Taung Su)	150111	Ah Htut		
Kya Man	150102	Ah Htut	17.5572°N 95.6067°E	
Set Kone	150107	Ah Htut	17.5647°N 95.6243°E	
Nin Chan U	150103	Ah Htut	17.5512°N 95.5977°E	
Ngu Kone	150108	Ah Htut	17.5576°N 95.6314°E	
Kya Man Chaung	150101	Ah Htut	17.5542°N 95.6043°E	
Hlwa Ni Kone	150113	Ah Htut	17.5644°N 95.6005°E	
Ah Htut	150099	Ah Htut	17.5416°N 95.6088°E	
Mee Thway Kone (Ah Lel Su)	150110	Ah Htut	17.5566°N 95.6188°E	
Ka Law	150106	Ah Htut	17.5642°N 95.6112°E	
Ywar Kant Lant	150100	Ah Htut	17.5501°N 95.606°E	
Mee Thway Kone (Ah Nauk Su)	150112	Ah Htut	17.5555°N 95.6168°E	
Pyayt Zin Kone Gyi	150105	Ah Htut		
Hpar Let Kho	152441	Hpar Let Kho	17.5524°N 95.5748°E	
Hpar Let Kho Gyi	152444	Hpar Let Kho	17.5566°N 95.5785°E	
Hpar Let Kho Lay	152443	Hpar Let Kho	17.5572°N 95.5732°E	
Nyaung Pin Su	152442	Hpar Let Kho	17.5546°N 95.5676°E	
Sar Hpyu Su	155912	Kyon Sha	17.3793°N 95.5979°E	
Kyaung Su	155913	Kyon Sha	17.3677°N 95.597°E	
Kyon Sha Ywar Ma	155910	Kyon Sha	17.3639°N 95.5974°E	
Ywar Thit	155911	Kyon Sha	17.3702°N 95.6003°E	
Sit Kone	155914	Kyon Sha	17.3712°N 95.5975°E	
Kone Tan	155915	Kyon Sha	17.3578°N 95.5884°E	
Kyee Pin Yoe	163980	Zaw Gyi Kwin	17.4041°N 95.5963°E	
Ka Nyin Yoe	163975	Zaw Gyi Kwin	17.4009°N 95.5965°E	
Ah Nauk Su	163982	Zaw Gyi Kwin	17.4015°N 95.5763°E	
Aung Tha Pyay	163983	Zaw Gyi Kwin	17.3848°N 95.5944°E	
Ta Laing Kone	163978	Zaw Gyi Kwin	17.3796°N 95.5775°E	
Zaw Gyi Kwin	163973	Zaw Gyi Kwin	17.3953°N 95.5824°E	
U Pu Ah Su	163974	Zaw Gyi Kwin	17.4061°N 95.585°E	
Kyan Taw	163979	Zaw Gyi Kwin	17.395°N 95.5754°E	
Kyon Soke	163976	Zaw Gyi Kwin	17.3834°N 95.5889°E	
Tha Pyu Tat	163977	Zaw Gyi Kwin	17.3767°N 95.5713°E	
Zaw Gyi (South)	163981	Zaw Gyi Kwin	17.3861°N 95.573°E	
Ah Shey Su	152481	Hpet Thaung		
Ah SheybYwar Thit Kone	152480	Hpet Thaung	17.3748°N 95.5702°E	
Thet Kei Kone (East)	152475	Hpet Thaung		
Hpet Thaung	152473	Hpet Thaung	17.3604°N 95.5478°E	
Hlay Lan (Myauk Su)	152478	Hpet Thaung	17.3744°N 95.5654°E	
Hlay Lan	152477	Hpet Thaung		
Ah Su Gyi	152476	Hpet Thaung	17.3763°N 95.564°E	
Ah Nauk Ywar Thit	152474	Hpet Thaung	17.3706°N 95.5549°E	
Thet Kei Kone (West)	152482	Hpet Thaung		
Ywar Ma (West)	152483	Hpet Thaung	17.3601°N 95.543°E	
Yone Chaung	152479	Hpet Thaung		
Taung Su	151311	Da Nu Bay	17.4256°N 95.5727°E	
Auk Kyin Su	151305	Da Nu Bay	17.4265°N 95.5693°E	
Ywar Thit	151307	Da Nu Bay	17.4258°N 95.5805°E	
Sat Aing	151308	Da Nu Bay	17.4395°N 95.5763°E	
Tha Pyu Kwin	151306	Da Nu Bay	17.4392°N 95.5887°E	
Da Nu Bay Ywar Ma	151304	Da Nu Bay	17.43°N 95.5739°E	
Ah Lel Su	151312	Da Nu Bay	17.4288°N 95.5717°E	
Kyu Taw	151310	Da Nu Bay		
Ah Nauk su	151309	Da Nu Bay	17.4321°N 95.5681°E	
Ah Byin Lel U	150016	Ah Byin	17.4089°N 95.5611°E	
Auk Kyin Su	150017	Ah Byin	17.4203°N 95.5679°E	
Ah Byin Ywar Ma	150014	Ah Byin	17.4126°N 95.5777°E	
Ah Byin La Har Sa	150015	Ah Byin	17.4056°N 95.5717°E	
May Yi (South)	157413	May Yi Lan	17.3817°N 95.5645°E	
May Yi Lel U	157414	May Yi Lan		
May Yi (North)	157415	May Yi Lan	17.388°N 95.5722°E	
May Yi Lan	157412	May Yi Lan	17.3838°N 95.5704°E	
Oe Bo Su	157416	May Yi Lan	17.3917°N 95.5587°E	
Htone Ta Yoke	155162	Kyar Inn	17.4417°N 95.6437°E	
Yae Pauk Gyi	155163	Kyar Inn	17.4465°N 95.6468°E	
Sein Lay (East)	155168	Kyar Inn	17.4273°N 95.6559°E	
Tar Gyi Tan	155167	Kyar Inn	17.4318°N 95.6486°E	
Sein Lay (North)	155166	Kyar Inn	17.4291°N 95.6525°E	
Yae Pauk Lay	155164	Kyar Inn	17.4364°N 95.6558°E	
Kyar Inn	155161	Kyar Inn	17.429°N 95.6434°E	
Sein Lay	155165	Kyar Inn	17.4224°N 95.6519°E	
Ah Nauk su	150470	Auk	17.3559°N 95.594°E	
Auk	150466	Auk	17.351°N 95.597°E	
Koke Ko Su	150467	Auk		
Chaung Hpyar	150468	Auk	17.3465°N 95.5828°E	
Kone Tan	150469	Auk		
Set Kone	150471	Auk	17.3404°N 95.5865°E	
Shwe Bo Su	162461	Thet Kei Kyun	17.4077°N 95.6371°E	
Kaing Kone	162459	Thet Kei Kyun	17.4097°N 95.6472°E	
Auk Su	162457	Thet Kei Kyun	17.4045°N 95.6393°E	
War Pa Taw	162456	Thet Kei Kyun	17.411°N 95.6287°E	
Nyaung Waing	162460	Thet Kei Kyun	17.4174°N 95.6353°E	
Ma Gyi Kone	162458	Thet Kei Kyun	17.4207°N 95.6465°E	
Thet Kei Kyun	162455	Thet Kei Kyun	17.4038°N 95.6366°E	
Hmaw Chaung	155673	Kyon Ei	17.3921°N 95.6025°E	
Gu Yat	155672	Kyon Ei	17.3935°N 95.5986°E	
Ohn Pin Su	155671	Kyon Ei	17.4061°N 95.6095°E	
Thar Yar su	155670	Kyon Ei	17.4079°N 95.6064°E	
Kyon Ei	155668	Kyon Ei	17.3871°N 95.6016°E	
Ku Lar Chaung	155669	Kyon Ei	17.4086°N 95.6155°E	
Kyon Mat	155857	Kyon Mat	17.4904°N 95.4422°E	
Kyet Ka Lay	155858	Kyon Mat	17.5208°N 95.4443°E	
Hne Mauk Tan	155859	Kyon Mat	17.5043°N 95.448°E	
Me Za Li Kone	155860	Kyon Mat	17.5185°N 95.4367°E	
Yae Kyaw	155861	Kyon Mat	17.5114°N 95.434°E	
Tha Yet Kone	155862	Kyon Mat	17.4997°N 95.4307°E	
Tha Yet Kone (South)	155780	Kyon Kyaik		
Kyon Kyaik	155778	Kyon Kyaik	17.5182°N 95.4282°E	
Tha Yet Kone (North)	155779	Kyon Kyaik		
Inn Kwet (South)	153126	Inn Ta Yaw	17.482°N 95.4197°E	
Sit Kone	153124	Inn Ta Yaw	17.4581°N 95.4133°E	
Pet Taw	153123	Inn Ta Yaw	17.4745°N 95.4166°E	
Inn Ta Yaw	153122	Inn Ta Yaw	17.4674°N 95.4182°E	
Mway Yat	153128	Inn Ta Yaw	17.4936°N 95.427°E	
Khon Sin Gyi	153127	Inn Ta Yaw	17.478°N 95.4141°E	
Saung Chin Yoe	153129	Inn Ta Yaw	17.453°N 95.4299°E	
Kyar Aing	153125	Inn Ta Yaw	17.4565°N 95.4164°E	
Wun Aing (North)	153131	Inn Ta Yaw	17.4749°N 95.4309°E	
Wun Aing (South)	153130	Inn Ta Yaw	17.4692°N 95.4268°E	
Kyar Aing Kwin Su	153134	Inn Ta Yaw	17.4604°N 95.4152°E	
Inn Kwei (North)	153132	Inn Ta Yaw	17.4851°N 95.4227°E	
Mway Yat Kan Su	153133	Inn Ta Yaw	17.4828°N 95.4257°E	
Nyaung Kone	159631	Pyin Ma Kone (West)	17.4716°N 95.4463°E	
Wun Aing (South)	159633	Pyin Ma Kone (West)	17.4644°N 95.4325°E	
Wun Aing (North)	159635	Pyin Ma Kone (West)	17.476°N 95.4325°E	
Tha Nei Tha Pauk	159636	Pyin Ma Kone (West)	17.4587°N 95.4451°E	
Kyon Mat	159632	Pyin Ma Kone (West)	17.4804°N 95.4429°E	
Pyin Ma Kone (West)	159629	Pyin Ma Kone (West)	17.4671°N 95.4489°E	
Kyon Lut	159630	Pyin Ma Kone (West)	17.4553°N 95.4368°E	
Wun Aing (Middle)	159634	Pyin Ma Kone (West)	17.4684°N 95.4342°E	
Kone Su	152161	Hne Mauk Tan		
Ywar Thit Kone	152160	Hne Mauk Tan	17.5142°N 95.4643°E	
Ywar Kant Lant	152159	Hne Mauk Tan	17.4952°N 95.4708°E	
Sein Waing	152158	Hne Mauk Tan	17.5047°N 95.4674°E	
Ah Lel Su	152162	Hne Mauk Tan	17.4981°N 95.4602°E	
Taung Su	152164	Hne Mauk Tan		
Inn Saung	152165	Hne Mauk Tan		
Ah Lel Paing	152157	Hne Mauk Tan	17.5034°N 95.452°E	
Kyan Taw	152156	Hne Mauk Tan	17.5063°N 95.4493°E	
Hne Mauk Tan	152155	Hne Mauk Tan	17.4959°N 95.4473°E	
Tha Yaw Zan	152163	Hne Mauk Tan	17.4899°N 95.4643°E	
Pyin Ma Kone (East)	159625	Pyin Ma Kone (East)	17.4731°N 95.4481°E	
Ma Gyi Kone	159627	Pyin Ma Kone (East)		
Ta Dar U	159628	Pyin Ma Kone (East)	17.4679°N 95.4505°E	
Kyon Mat	159626	Pyin Ma Kone (East)	17.4797°N 95.4448°E	
Tha Yet Chaung	160763	Sun Pi	17.4719°N 95.4564°E	
Sun Pi	160760	Sun Pi	17.4627°N 95.4519°E	
Thin Gan Pin	160762	Sun Pi	17.4532°N 95.4474°E	
Tha Nei Tha Pauk	160764	Sun Pi	17.4579°N 95.4459°E	
Nat Hpaung Seik	160765	Sun Pi	17.4633°N 95.4563°E	
Kyee Thone Pin	160761	Sun Pi	17.4672°N 95.4588°E	
Ta Yaw Zan	153613	Ka Tawt Ka Yat		
Ka Tawt Ka Yet	153608	Ka Tawt Ka Yat	17.4688°N 95.4649°E	
Myaing Gyi	153611	Ka Tawt Ka Yat	17.4928°N 95.4725°E	
Kyun Taw	153609	Ka Tawt Ka Yat		
Myaing Auk	153610	Ka Tawt Ka Yat		
Khin Pyayt	153612	Ka Tawt Ka Yat	17.4741°N 95.4797°E	
Kyon Za Yat	156680	Lay Tu (West)	17.4866°N 95.486°E	
Lay Tu (West)	156679	Lay Tu (West)	17.4824°N 95.5103°E	
Yae Kyaw	163661	Yin Taik Kone		
Byin Nyar Lay	163660	Yin Taik Kone	17.4891°N 95.5508°E	
Ywar Thar	163658	Yin Taik Kone	17.4928°N 95.5478°E	
Nyaung Aing	163657	Yin Taik Kone	17.5053°N 95.5425°E	
Kyon Tone	163656	Yin Taik Kone	17.4978°N 95.5411°E	
Yin Taik Kone	163655	Yin Taik Kone	17.4951°N 95.5498°E	
Nyaung Aing Gyi	163659	Yin Taik Kone	17.4993°N 95.5464°E	
Nyaung Aing Gyi	162364	Thea Kone	17.5017°N 95.5454°E	
Thea Kone	162363	Thea Kone	17.5144°N 95.5401°E	
Kyon Tone	155957	Kyon Ta Naw (South)	17.4967°N 95.5371°E	
Kyon Ta Naw (South)	155956	Kyon Ta Naw (South)	17.5059°N 95.532°E	
Nyaung Aing Lay	155958	Kyon Ta Naw (South)	17.4996°N 95.5372°E	
Kyon Kha Mun	155762	Kyon Kha Mun	17.4985°N 95.5259°E	
Kyon Kha Mun (North)	155764	Kyon Kha Mun	17.5004°N 95.5267°E	
Ahr La Bat	155763	Kyon Kha Mun	17.5028°N 95.5234°E	
Kyon Ta Naw (North)	155954	Kyon Ta Naw (North)	17.508°N 95.5311°E	
Hmyaw Aing	155955	Kyon Ta Naw (North)	17.5203°N 95.5329°E	
Thea Kone	158716	Oe Bo	17.5177°N 95.54°E	
Ta Khun Taing	158718	Oe Bo	17.5304°N 95.5285°E	
Tar Kyoe Paing	158717	Oe Bo		
Hmyawt Aing	158719	Oe Bo	17.5209°N 95.5335°E	
Oe Bo	158715	Oe Bo	17.5304°N 95.541°E	
Daunt Gyi	151410	Daunt Gyi	17.5365°N 95.5333°E	
Nyaung Pin Lay	161861	Tha Yet Chaung	17.5303°N 95.5222°E	
Ah Yoe Taung	161862	Tha Yet Chaung	17.5431°N 95.5222°E	
Kwin Gyi (East)	161863	Tha Yet Chaung	17.5354°N 95.5161°E	
Ah Dar	161864	Tha Yet Chaung	17.5315°N 95.5031°E	
Thea Hpyu	161865	Tha Yet Chaung	17.5168°N 95.5112°E	
Kyee Taw Yoe	161866	Tha Yet Chaung	17.5259°N 95.5211°E	
Daung Su	161868	Tha Yet Chaung	17.5178°N 95.5209°E	
Kwin Gyi (West)	161869	Tha Yet Chaung	17.536°N 95.5096°E	
Tha Yet Chaung	161860	Tha Yet Chaung	17.5403°N 95.5238°E	
Ta Khun Taing	161867	Tha Yet Chaung	17.5332°N 95.5301°E	
Ywar Kant Lant	161176	Taung Boet Ta Yar	17.5796°N 95.5058°E	
Mee Laung Kone	161180	Taung Boet Ta Yar	17.5888°N 95.5205°E	
Htauk Kyant	161173	Taung Boet Ta Yar	17.5416°N 95.5198°E	
Inn Wa	161184	Taung Boet Ta Yar		
War Tha La	161175	Taung Boet Ta Yar	17.5662°N 95.5024°E	
Ma Gyi Kone	161186	Taung Boet Ta Yar		
Tha Yet Chaung	161187	Taung Boet Ta Yar	17.5387°N 95.5202°E	
Yae Le	161188	Taung Boet Ta Yar		
Tha Yet Hnit Pin	161183	Taung Boet Ta Yar	17.5742°N 95.5063°E	
Kyar Zan Kone	161185	Taung Boet Ta Yar		
Shan Kone	161181	Taung Boet Ta Yar	17.5821°N 95.5125°E	
Yae Lel Thaung	161179	Taung Boet Ta Yar	17.5878°N 95.5754°E	
Tha Yut Wa	161178	Taung Boet Ta Yar	17.5935°N 95.5234°E	
Sar Hpyu Su	161177	Taung Boet Ta Yar	17.5855°N 95.5159°E	
May Don	161174	Taung Boet Ta Yar	17.5627°N 95.5021°E	
Taung Boet Ta Yar	161172	Taung Boet Ta Yar	17.5909°N 95.5297°E	
Gway Tauk Chaung	161182	Taung Boet Ta Yar	17.5708°N 95.5038°E	
