= Chichora =

- Village
- Location of Chichora, Bihar, India Chichora (India)
- Coordinates: 26°24′23″N 87°44′45″E
- Country: India
- State: Bihar
- District: Kishanganj district

Government
  - Type: Panchayat Raaj
  - Body: Sarpanch
- Elevation: 53 m (174 ft)

Population (2011)
  - Total: 1,198

Languages
  - Official: Hindi
- Time zone: UTC+5:30 (IST)
- Postal code: 855101
- Vehicle registration: BR

Chichora is a village in Kishanganj district, Bihar, India, which comes under P.O.-Bairia, Block-Terhagachh. The village is located in the northern part of the district Kishanganj, and is bordered by Nepal in the north, the village of Bairia in the West, and the Kankai river in the East. The village is divided into three parts: Main Chichora, Eastern Chichora (Purabgaon) and Southern Chichora (Dakhingaon). The total geographical area of the village is 306 hectares.

As per constitution of India and Panchyati Raaj Act, Chichora village is administrated by Sarpanch (Head of Village) who is elected representative of village.

== Demographics ==
Chichora is a medium size village located in Terhagachh Block of Kishanganj district, Bihar with total 235 families residing. The Chichora village has population of 1198 of which 633 are males while 565 are females as per Population Census 2011. Population Density of the village is 391 person per square km.

In Chichora village population of children with age 0-6 is 240 which makes up 20.03 % of total population of village. Average Sex Ratio of Chichora village is 893 which is lower than Bihar state average of 918. Child Sex Ratio for the Chichora as per census is 920, lower than Bihar average of 935.

Chichora village has higher literacy rate compared to Bihar. In 2011, literacy rate of Chichora village was 64.30 % compared to 61.80 % of Bihar. In Chichora Male literacy stands at 75.79 % while female literacy rate was 51.33 %. Children (aged under 6 years) population of the village is 20%, among them 52% are boys and 48% are girls. There are 235 households in the village and an average 5 persons live in every family.

== Caste Factor ==
86% of the whole population are from general caste, 11% are from scheduled caste and 2% are scheduled tribes.

Some specific personalities in this village are:

- Sarwan Kumar Pandit, who is serving in the Bihar Police at Katihar District (Bihar) in the District Armed Police DAP).
- Satya Narayan Pandit, who is serving in Survey Of India Department.
- Raj Narayan Das, who is serving in SSB under the post of Constable.
- Lakhan Lal Pandit, also known as Panditji – a famous politician.

== Caste classification ==
1. Kumhar
2. Malha
3. Koch
4. Harijan

== Places To See ==
The village is located near a very thick forest, the Chichora Forest, also called as "Jhaar" by the native people. The forest encloses a thick green lush of trees which borders it to the neighbouring country of Nepal. Distance to the open Nepal border is merely 2 km, making it very much convenient for trade as well.
