= Mangurjan, Kishanganj =

Mangurjan मांगूरजान
- Location in Bihar
- Coordinates: 26.308°N 88.212°E
- District: Kishanganj district
- State: Bihar
- Country: India

Population (2011)
  - Total: 245

Language
  - Official: Hindi

Mangurjan is a village in Kishanganj district of Bihar state of India.

== See also ==
- Mangurjan railway station
