= List of villages in Samastipur =

This is a comprehensive list of villages (by subdivision block) in Samastipur district in Bihar State, India, per the results of the 2011 Census of India.

== Samastipur subdivision ==
- Bahadurpur
- Jagdishpur
- Bishunpur
- Harpur Ailoth
- Dhurlakh
- Bikrampur Bande
- Dudhpura
- Lagunia Raghu Kanth

== Rosera subdivision ==
- Ahira Kalyanpur
- Bataha
- Bhiraha
- Damodarpur
- Khaira
- Mohiuddi Nagar
- Sonupur
- Motipur
- Pabra

== Dalsinghsarai subdivision ==
- Ajnaul
- Bulakipur
- Khoksa
- Nawada
- Mukhtarpur Salkhani
- Panr

== Patori subdivision ==
- Adalpur
- Bishunpur Paharpur
- Fatehpur
- Shahpur Patory
