= Akhta, India =

Akhta
- village
- Location in Bihar, India Akhta (India)
- Coordinates: 26°39′31″N 85°18′32″E
- Country: India
- State: Bihar
- Region: Mithila
- District: Sitamarhi
- Talukas: Suppi; Bairgania

Languages
  - Official: Maithili, Hindi
- Time zone: UTC+5:30 (IST)
- ISO 3166 code: IN-BR

Akhta is a village in Sitamarhi district, Bihar, India. It is located in two neighbouring taluks (subdistricts of India) : Suppi and Bairgania.
