= Tagundaing, Kayin State =

Somohto စံင်မံင်ထုင်း Tagundaing
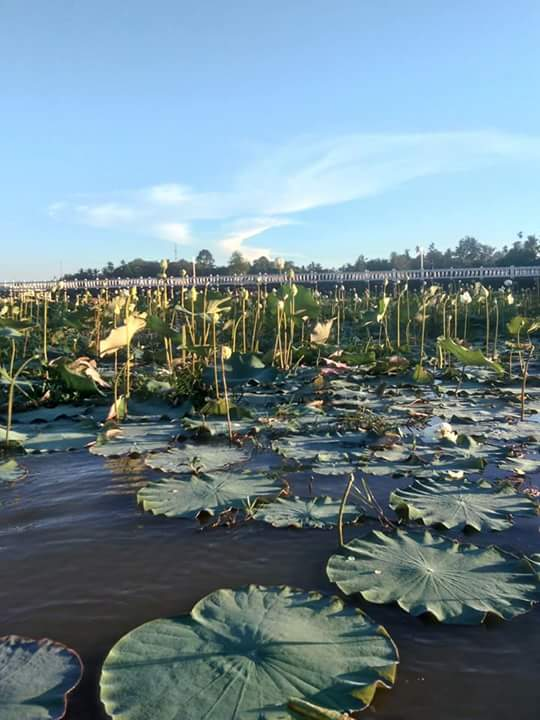
- Padma flower

- Location of Tagondaing, Myanmar
- Coordinates: 16°3′59″N 97°54′27″E
- Country: Myanmar
- State: Kayin State
- District: Kyain Seikgyi District
- Township: Kyain Seikgyi Township

Area
  - City: 2.43 sq mi (6.30 km^{2})
- Elevation: 56 ft (17 m)

Population (2014)Karens, Mons, Burmans, Indians
  - City: 9,601
  - Density: 3,950/sq mi (1,520/km^{2})
  - Urban: 4,994
  - Rural: 4,607
- Time zone: UTC+6.30 (MMT)
  - Summer (DST): UTC16° 4' 3" North, 97° 54' 25" East
- Area code: 58
- Climate: Am

Somohto,Tagundaing or Ta Khun Taing (Burmese: တံခွန်တိုင်, MLCTS: tam hkwan tuing, IPA: [dəɡʊ̀ɴ dàiɴ]; Phlone: စံင်မံင်ထုင်း; Thai: ดะกูนไดง์; Korean: 타군다잉; Russian: Тагундайн, also spelled Tagondaing) is a large village in the Kayin State of south-eastern Myanmar, located near the west bank of the Winyaw River and the west of the Kyain Seikgyi Township, Kyain Seikgyi District. The population as of the 2014 census was 4,994. Most residents are of the Karen (Kayin) ethnic group.

The people in speak Kayin and Burmese languages.

Nearby towns and villages include Kale (3.4 nm)north, Htimahto (6.4 nm)south-east, Phayanasu (7.1 nm)north, Kawankathaung (7.1 nm)east, Hlagazaing (7.5 nm)north, Myohaung (7.9 nm)north, Phathalē (8.7 nm)east and Akalaw (11.0 nm)east.

== Etymology ==
In the Kayin, the word Somohto (စံင်မံင်ထုင်း) means monumental column or flagstaff. Thus, the village name of "'Tagundaing'" was derived from the local Kayin.

== History ==
The name of the village gets its name from a monumental column or flagstaff located in the village centre.

During World War II, the villagers worked on the construction of the Burma-Siam railroad with their cart as forced labourers.

== Geography ==
Tagundaing or Tagondaing is located on the eastern side of the Tenasserim Range near the confluence of two tributaries of the Ataran River.

=== Climate ===
Tagundaing has a tropical monsoon climate (Köppen Am). Temperatures are very warm to hot throughout the year, although maximum temperatures in the monsoon months are depressed by heavy cloud and rain. There is a winter dry season (November–April) and a summer wet season (May–October). Torrential rain falls from June to September, with over 1,200 millimetres (47 in) falling in August alone.

Climate data for Tagundaing
Month	Jan	Feb	Mar	Apr	May	Jun	Jul	Aug	Sep	Oct	Nov	Dec	Year
Mean daily maximum °C (°F)	31.7 (89.1)	33.0 (91.4)	33.8 (92.8)	34.6 (94.3)	30.0 (86.0)	29.2 (84.6)	28.5 (83.3)	28.4 (83.1)	29.5 (85.1)	30.5 (86.9)	31.5 (88.7)	31.8 (89.2)	31.0 (87.9)
Mean daily minimum °C (°F)	16.9 (62.4)	17.3 (63.1)	19.0 (66.2)	21.5 (70.7)	22.3 (72.1)	22.0 (71.6)	21.6 (70.9)	21.8 (71.2)	21.9 (71.4)	21.4 (70.5)	20.4 (68.7)	17.9 (64.2)	20.3 (68.6)
Average rainfall mm (inches)	5 (0.2)	3 (0.1)	11 (0.4)	57 (2.2)	476 (18.7)	1,076 (42.4)	692 (27.2)	1,261 (49.6)	733 (28.9)	259 (10.2)	57 (2.2)	11 (0.4)	4,641 (182.5)
Source: NOAA (1961-1990)

== Economy ==
Tagundaing is a primary agricultural village, surrounded by extensive fields. The economy is mainly based on rice, rubber and trade.

== Transport ==
The main artery in the region is the Tagondaing-Kale-Phayanasu-Taungkalay Road, which is 16 kilometres (9.9 mi) long. It is connected by road to Kyainseikgyi-Mudon and via Mudon to Mawlamyine.

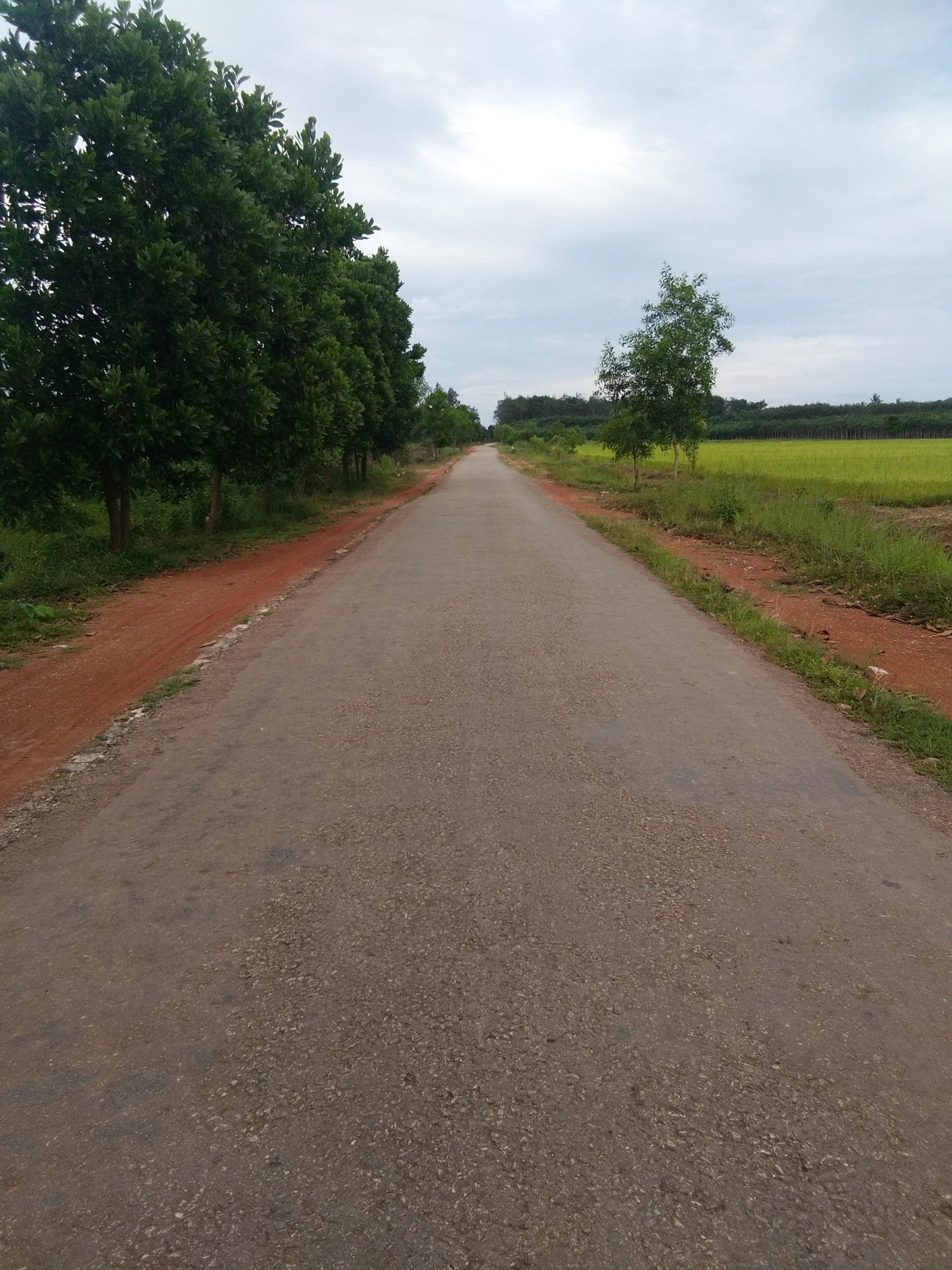
Tagundaing (Tagondaing) - Tanyin Segment

The second main road is Tagondaing-Taungdi-Kyongawon-Phabya Road, it is connected Thanbyuzayat-Payathonzu Road (or Burmese-Siam Railroad), via Tanyin village.

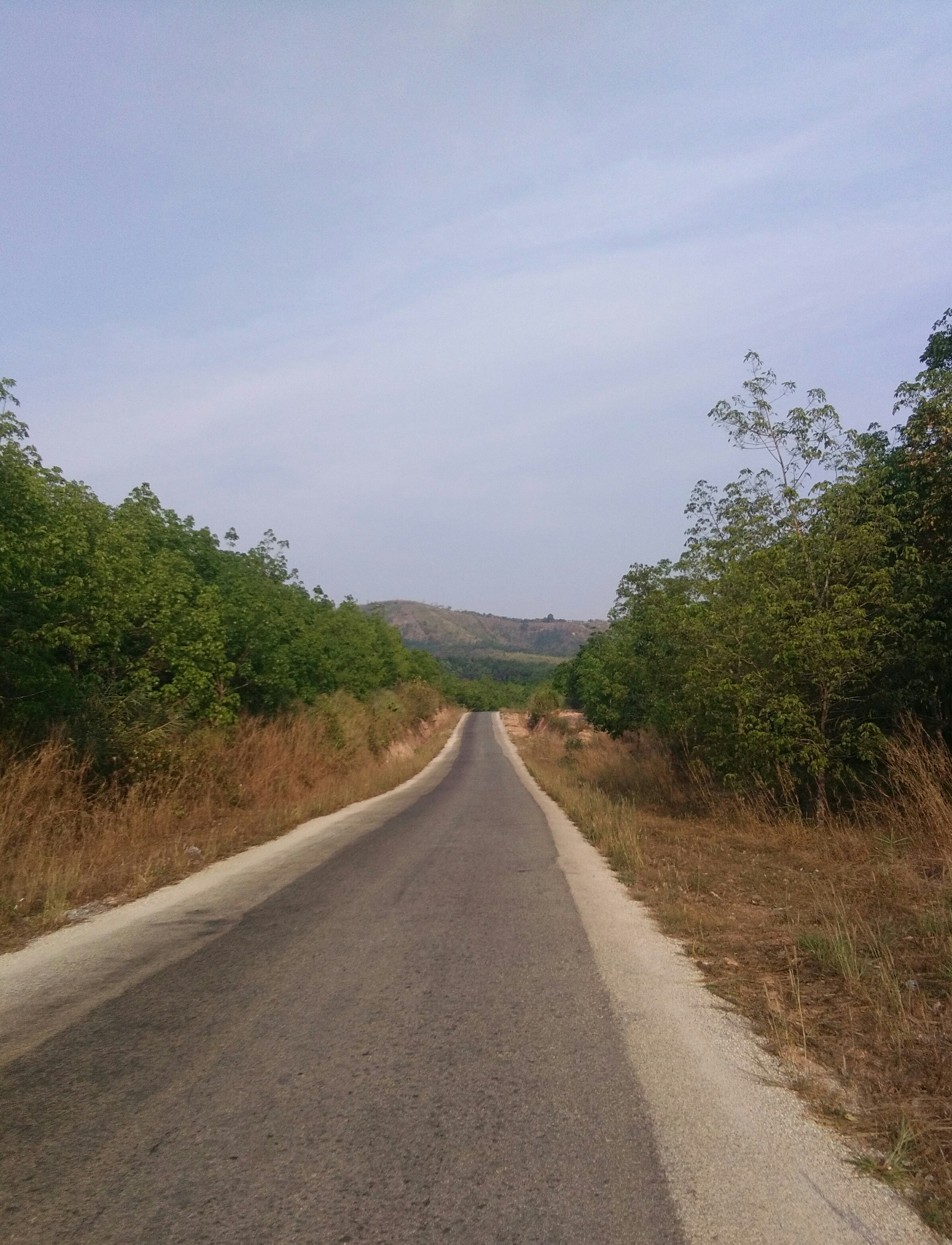
Tagondaing - Abit Road

Five miles by road to the west of village lie Abit village west of the Tenasserim Range, which road is connected to National Highway 8. Two miles is compacted.

Ta Khun Taing - Kawan Ka Thaung Road is about two miles long, crossing the Winyaw River.

== Education ==
Tagundaing has one public high school, one public post-primary school and four public primary schools.

- Basic Education High School Tagondaing
- Post-Primary School (It is a post-primary school that is not a full middle school), formerly "No. 4 Basic Education Primary School"
- No. 1 Basic Education Primary School
- No. 2 Basic Education Primary School
- No. 3 Basic Education Primary School
- Basic Education Primary School (Tagundaing New Quarter)

== Healthcare ==
Kale-Tagundaing Station Hospital serves the people of Kale, Tagondaing and its surrounding areas.

== Places of interest ==
- Mahniyadanar Sandawshin Pagoda

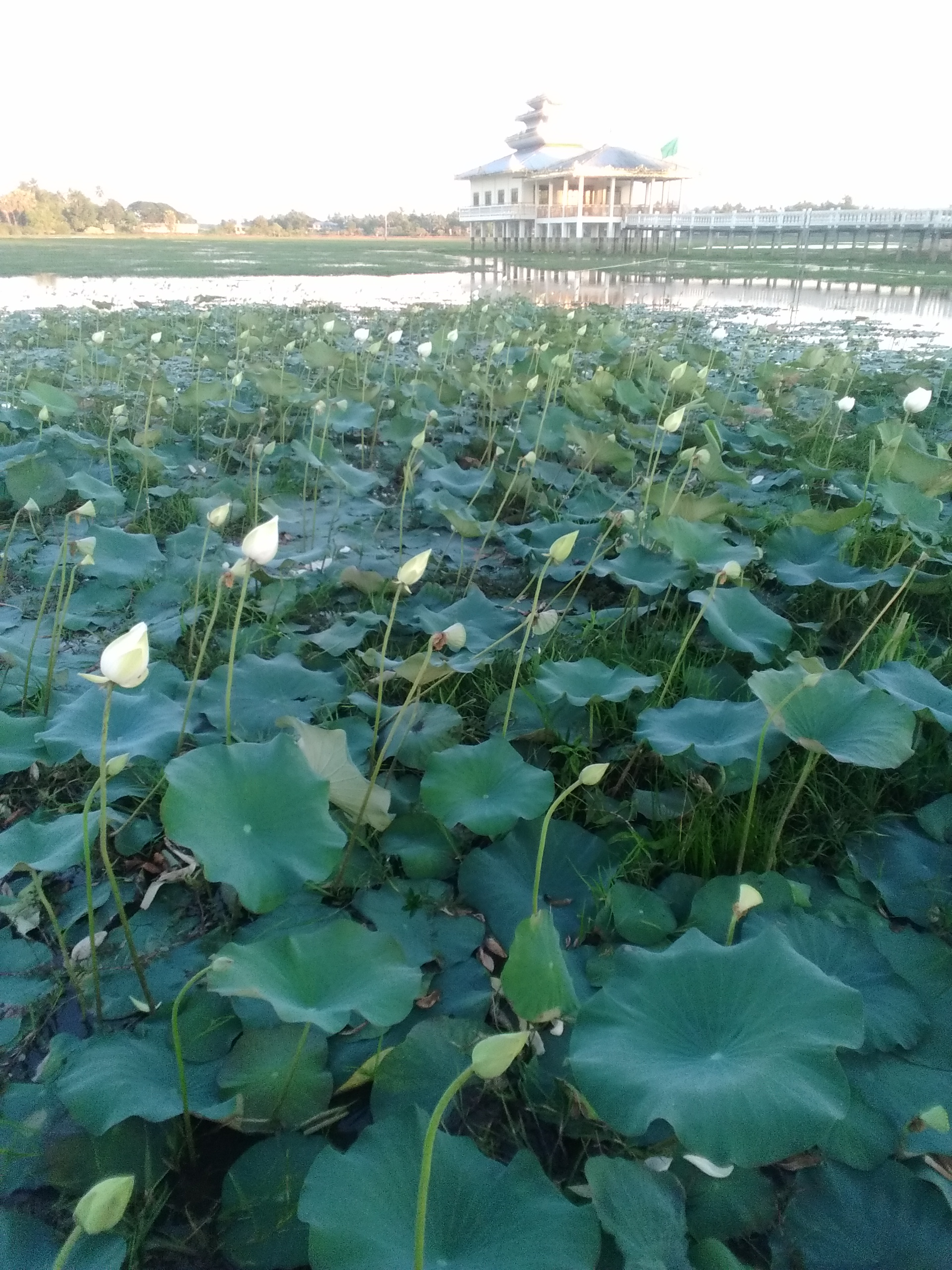
Padma Lotus (Species of plant)

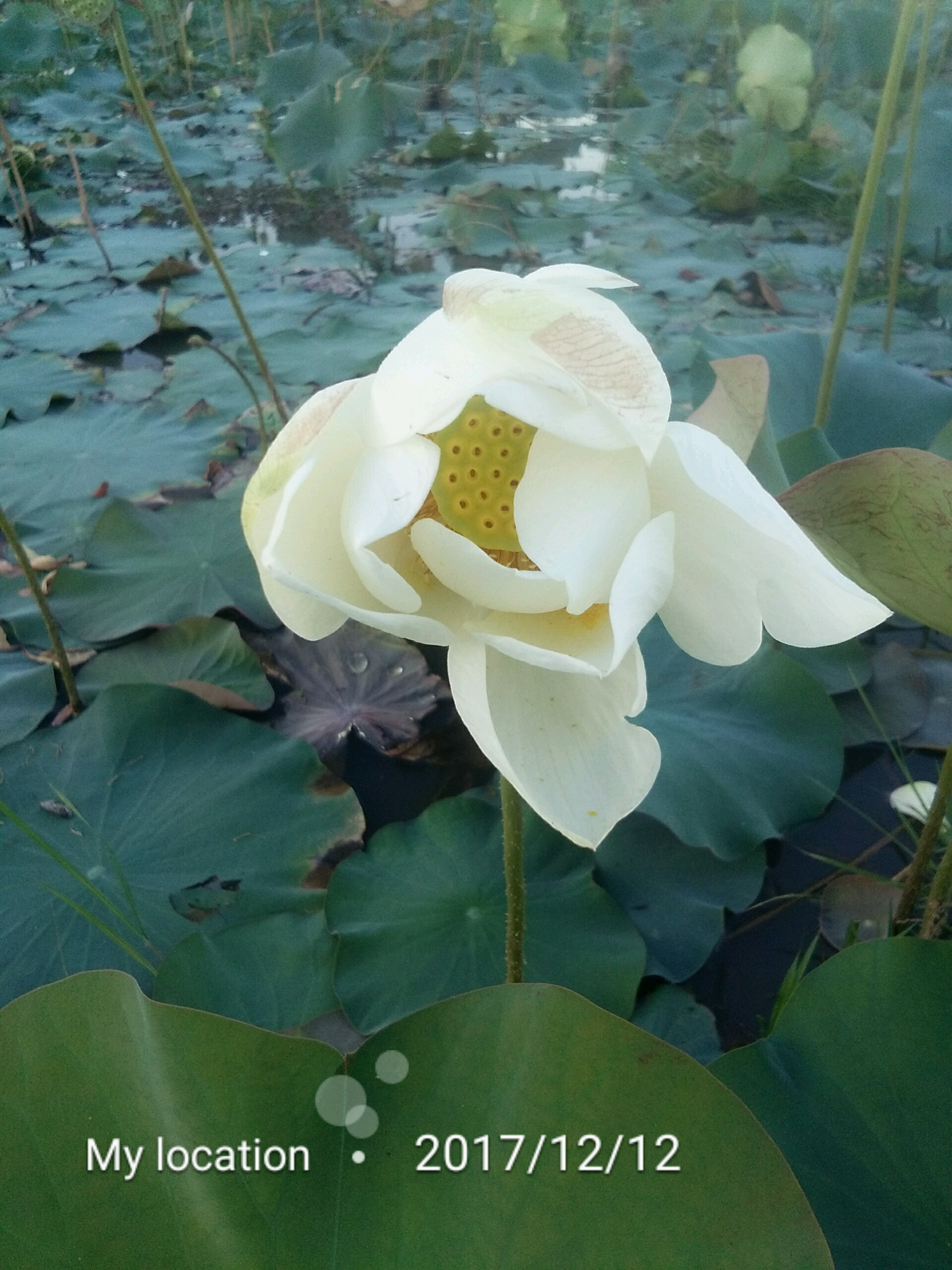
Padma Flower (Species of plant)

- White Padma lotus and many other families harvest plants such as the grass, can be found in this area.

== Gallery ==
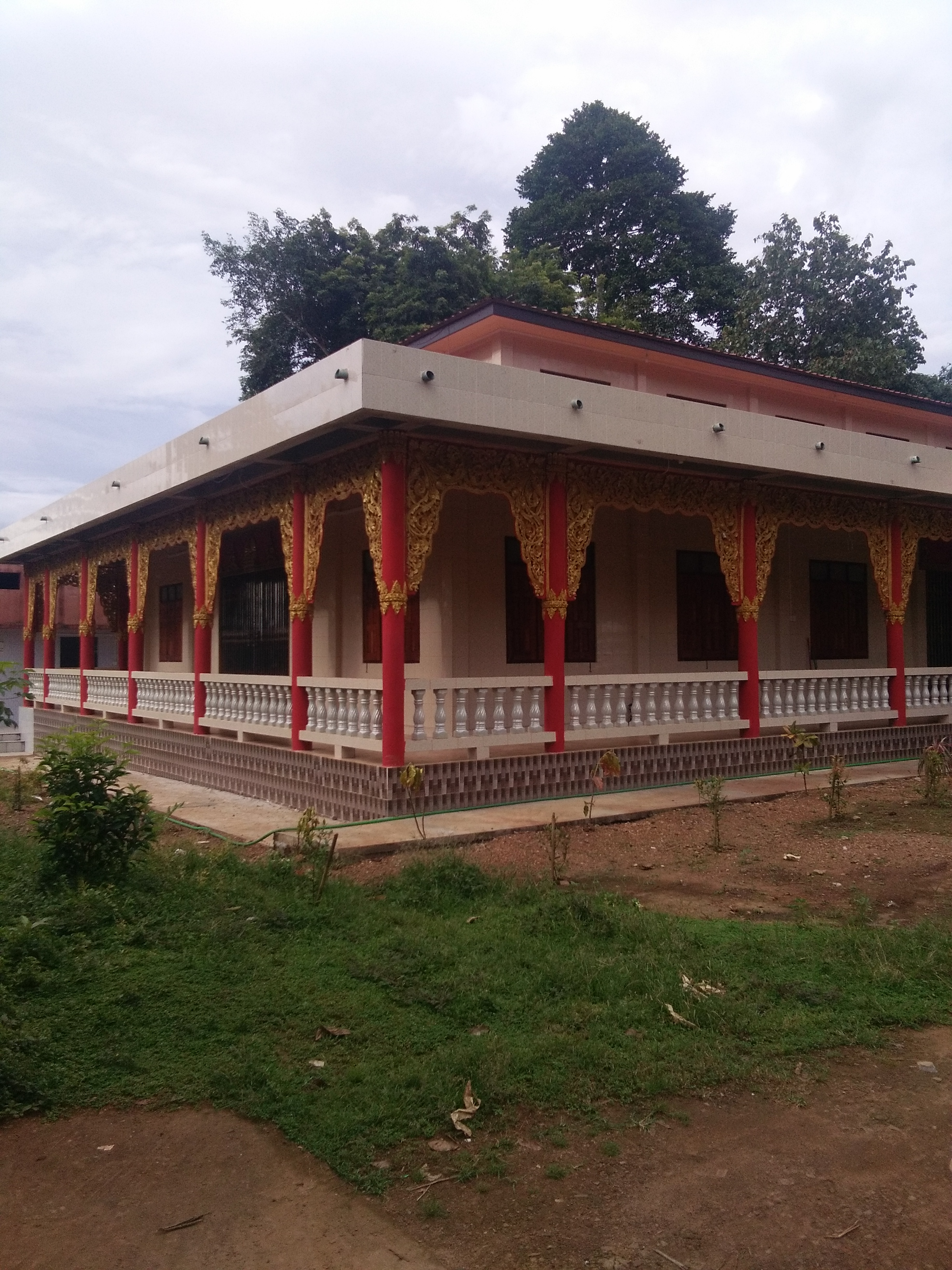
Wonnral Awar Dhammayone (Chapels)

== See also ==
- Kayin State

== Notes ==
- Tageo.com
- Tagundaing Geonames
- Tagondaing Mapcarta.com
- Kayin State of asterism.info
