= Let Hpaw =

Let Hpaw ရက်ဖော
- Village
- Location within Myanmar
- Coordinates: 15°46′N 97°54′E
- Country: Myanmar
- State: Kayin State
- District: Kawkareik District
- Township: Kyain Seikgyi Township
- Time zone: UTC+6:30 (MST)
- Area code: 58

Let Hpaw or Retpu (Burmese: ရက်ဖော) is a village, village tract of Hlut Shan (Lutshan) in Kyain Seikgyi Township, Kawkareik District, Kayin State, Myanmar (Burma). It lies on the alongside of Thailand–Burma Railway.

== Camp Rephaw ==
Camp Rephaw (also 30 Kilo) was a prisoner of war camp on the Burma Railway during World War II. It started as a large work camp. The first prisoners arrived on 26 December 1942, and were tasked to lay 15 kilometres of railway to Anakwin. During the monsoon season, there was a shortage of food. On 1 July, a hospital camp was established at Rephaw, and subject to strafing attacks by the allied airforces.
