= Sinpyay =

Sinpyay ဆင်ပြေး
- Location in Myanmar
- Coordinates: 15°36′0″N 98°6′0″E
- Country: Myanmar
- State: Kayin State
- District: Kawkareik District
- Township: Kyain Seikgyi Township
- Village Tract: Kyauk Bi Lu

Population
  - Religions: Buddhism
- Time zone: UTC+6.30 (MMT)
- Area code: 58

Sinpyay (Burmese: ဆင်ပြေး), formerly called Shitpyit is a village in southwestern Kyain Seikgyi Township, Kawkareik District, in the Karen State of Myanmar. It is a location on the Death Railway. The village is located in Kyauk Bi Lu village tract.
