= Winpok =

- Location within Myanmar
- Coordinates: 16°24′0″N 98°3′0″E
- Country: Myanmar
- State: Kayin State
- District: Kawkareik District
- Township: Kyain Seikgyi Township
- Time zone: UTC+6:30 (MST)

Winpok is a village in Kawkareik District, Kayin State of Myanmar (Burma).
