= Katokkra =

- Location in Myanmar
- Coordinates: 15°47′0″N 98°33′0″E
- Country: Myanmar
- State: Kayin State
- District: Kawkareik District
- Township: Kyain Seikgyi Township

Population
  - Religions: Buddhism
- Time zone: UTC+6.30 (MST)
- Area code: 58

Katokkra is a village in Kyain Seikgyi Township, Kawkareik District, in the Kayin State of Myanmar. Katokkra is on the Haungtharaw River and lies only 3.22 kilometres (2.00 mi) from the border with Thailand.
