= Taungbauk =

- Village
- Location in Burma
- Coordinates: 15°55′N 98°2′E
- Country: Burma
- State: Kayin State
- District: Kawkareik District
- Township: Kyain Seikgyi Township
- Time zone: UTC+6.30 (MST)

Taungbauk or Taung Pauk (Burmese: တောင်ပေါက် [tàʊɴbàʊk]) is a village in Kyain Seikgyi Township, Kawkareik District, in the Kayin State of south-eastern Burma (Myanmar).
