= Ywathit, Kyain Seikgyi =

Kyarin ကြာအင်း
- Village
- Location in Myanmar
- Coordinates: 16°3′49″N 97°59′16″E
- Country: Myanmar
- State: Kayin State
- District: Kawkareik District
- Township: Kyarin Seikgyi Township

Population
  - Religions: Buddhism
- Time zone: UTC+6.30 (MST)
- Area code: 58

Kyar Inn (Burmese: ကြာအင်း [jwàðɪʔ]) is a village in Kyain Seikgyi Township, Kawkareik District, in the Kayin State of Myanmar. It is located on the eastern bank of the Winyaw River.
