= Apalon =

- Location in Myanmar
- Coordinates: 15°28′53″N 98°13′59″E
- Country: Myanmar
- State: (Kayin State) Karen State
- District: Kawkareik District
- Township: Kyain Seikgyi Township
- Elevation: 83 m (272 ft)

Population (2014)
  - Total: 2,998
  - Religions: Buddhism
- Time zone: UTC+6.30 (MST)
- Area code: 58

Apalon (Pwo Eastern Karen: အ်ုပၠုံ) is a village alongside the Zami River in Kyain Seikgyi Township, Kawkareik District, Karen State, south-eastern Myanmar. The areas around Apalon are mountainous and forested. It is located on the Death Railway.

Apalon (also: Camp 82 Kilo) was a Japanese prisoner of war work camp during World War II. The camp was initially used for the construction of a 50 metres steel bridge. It served as the headquarters of group 5. The first prisoners arrived in May 1943. From July 1944 onwards, it served as a repair shop for locomotives. The camp closed in August 1945.

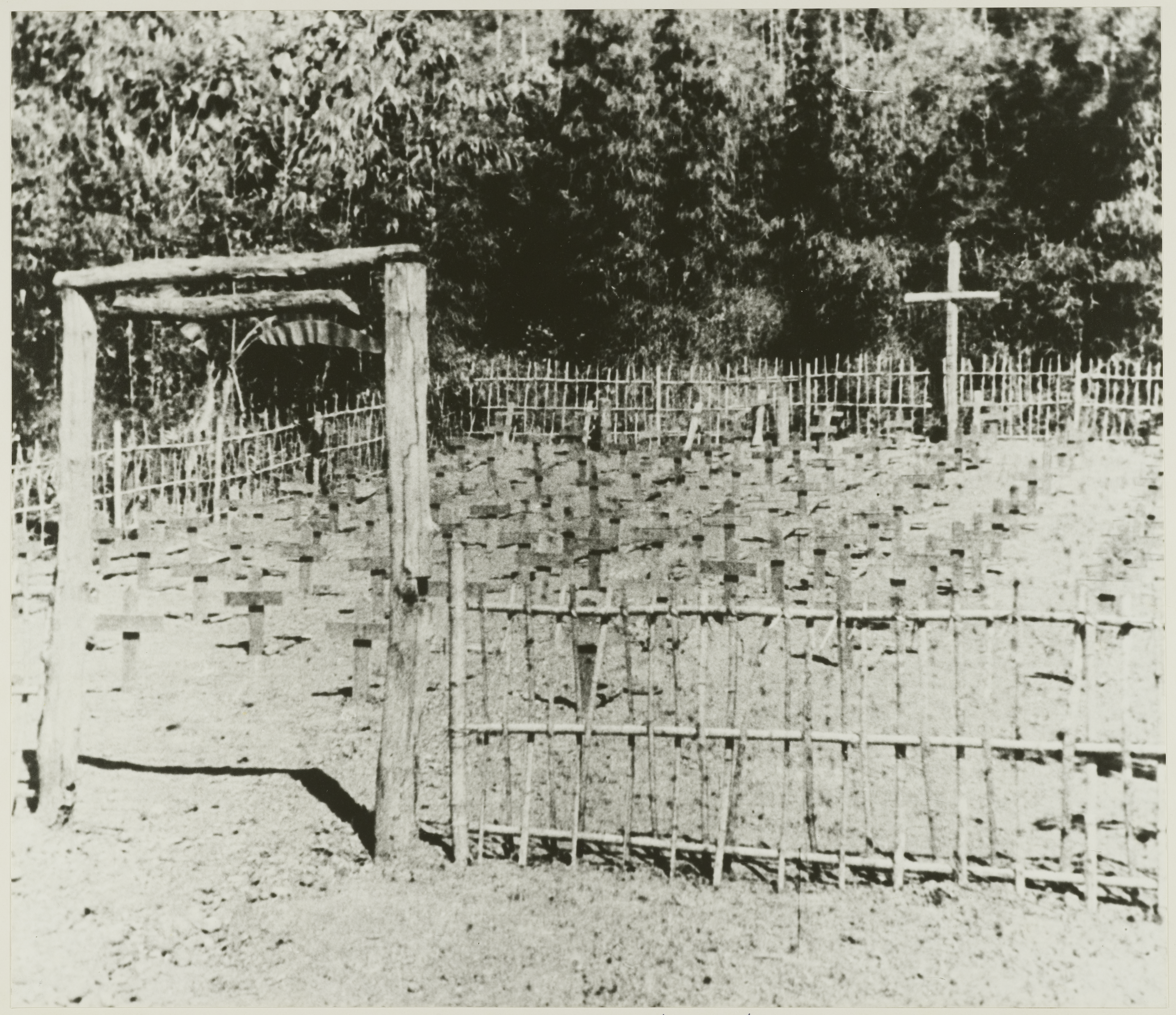
Former graveyard at Apalon

== Notes ==
- Death Railway in Apalon
- Weatherman.com in Apalon
