= Kanni (disambiguation) =

Kanni is a dog breed found in the Indian state of Tamil Nadu.

Kanni may also refer to:

- Kanni (2024 Marathi-language film), a 2024 Indian Marathi-language romantic comedy-drama film by Sameer Joshi
- Kanni (2024 Tamil-language film), a 2024 Tamil-language mystery, thriller film by Mayon Siva Thorapadi
- Kanni, Banmauk, Myanmar
- Kanni, Kalewa, Myanmar
- Kanni I, Kyain Seikgyi, Myanmar
- Kanni II, Kyain Seikgyi, Myanmar

== See also ==
- Kani (disambiguation)
