= Shanywathit =

- Location in Myanmar
- Coordinates: 17°25′28″N 97°53′16″E
- Country: Myanmar
- State: Kayin State
- District: Hpa-an District
- Township: Hlaingbwe Township

Population (2014)
  - Total: 21,735
  - Religions: Buddhism
- Time zone: UTC+6.30 (MST)
- Area code: 58

Shanywathit (Burmese: ရှမ်းရွာသစ်မြို့) is a town in Hlaingbwe Township, Hpa-an District, in the Kayin State of Myanmar. In the 2014 census, the town had a population of 21,735.
