= Peinnegon, Kayin State =

Peinnegon ပိန္နဲကုန်း
- Location in Myanmar
- Coordinates: 16°22′0″N 98°19′0″E
- Country: Myanmar
- State: Kayin State
- District: Kawkareik District
- Township: Kyain Seikgyi Township
- Village tract: Ah sun

Population
  - Religions: Buddhism
- Time zone: UTC+6.30 (MMT)
- Area code: 58

Peinnegon (Burmese: ပိန္နဲကုန်း) is a village in northeastern Kyain Seikgyi Township, Kawkareik District, in the Kayin State of Myanmar.

== Location ==
It is on the foothills of the Dawna Range and located 2 miles (3.2 km) from the border with Kawkareik Township on the eastern bank of the Haungtharaw River. It is located within the Ah sun village tract.
