= Myawaddy Township =

Myawaddy Township မြဝတီမြို့နယ်
- township
- Location in Kayin State
- Coordinates: 16°30′N 98°25′E
- Country: Myanmar (Burma)
- State: Kayin State
- District: Myawaddy District
- Capital: Myawaddy

Population (2014)
  - Total: 210,540
- Time zone: UTC+6:30 (MST)

Myawaddy Township (S'gaw Karen: ရါမတံၤကီၢ်ဆၣ်, Phlone မေဝ်ပ္တီကၞင့်; Burmese: မြဝတီမြို့နယ်) is a township of Myawaddy District in the Kayin State of Burma (Myanmar). It is the only township in Myawaddy District. The administrative seat is the town of Myawaddy.

== Boundaries ==
Myawaddy Township borders on:

- Kyain Seikgyi Township of Kawkareik District to the southwest and west,
- Kawkareik Township of Kawkareik District to the west,
- Hlaingbwe Township of Hpa-an District to the northwest, and
- Thailand to the northeast, east and south.
