= Than Pu Yar =

Than Pu Yar သံပုရာ
- Village
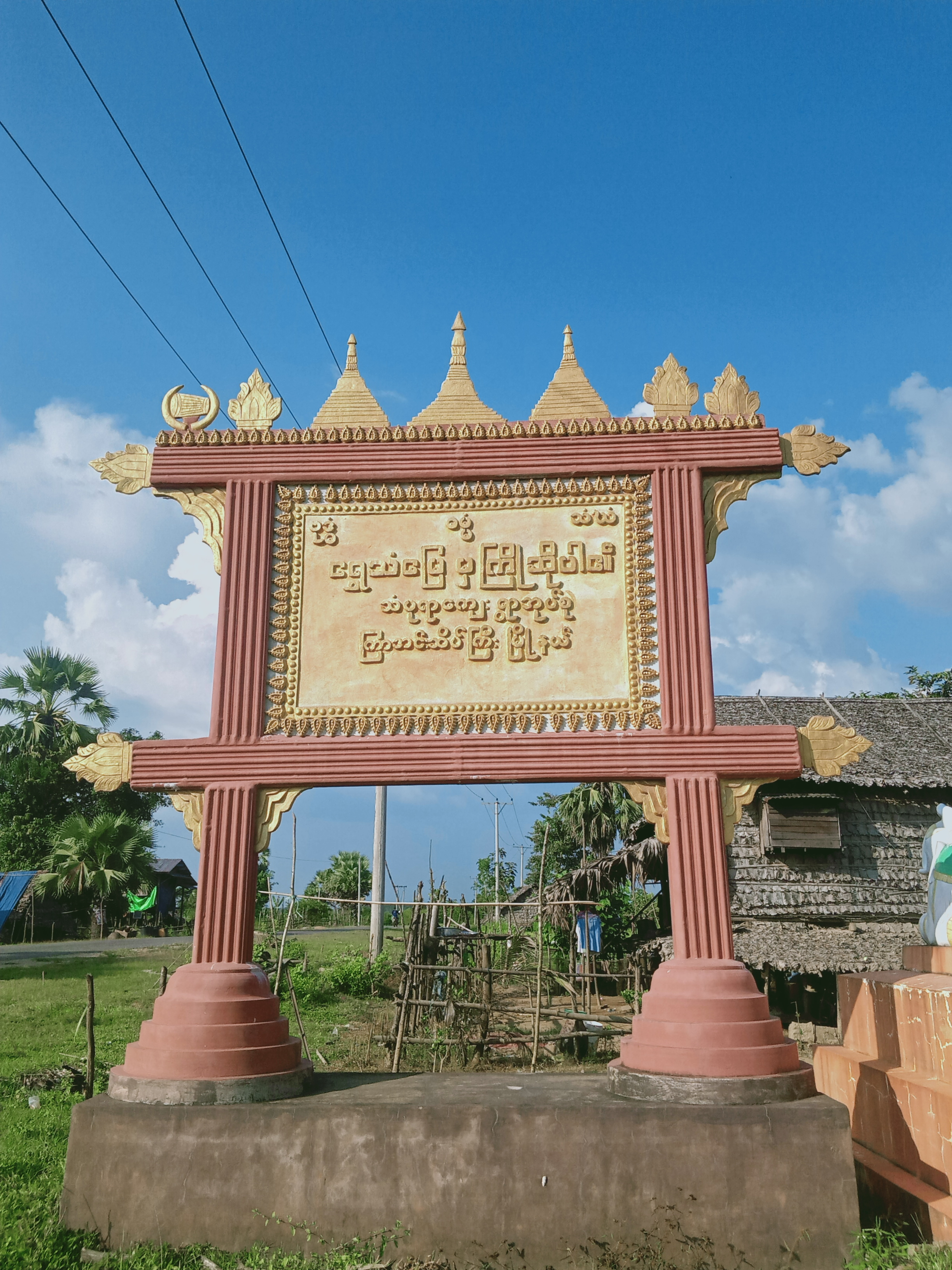
- Welcome sign

- Location within Myanmar
- Coordinates: 16.1233°N 98.0320°E
- Country: Myanmar
- State: Kayin State
- District: Kawkareik District
- Township: Kyain Seikgyi Township

Population (2014)
  - Total: 4,172
- Time zone: UTC+6:30 (MST)

Than Pu Yar or Thanbaya (Burmese: သံပုရာ) is a village tract of Kyain Seikgyi Township, Kawkareik District, in Kayin State, Myanmar (Burma). In 2014 it had a total population of 4,172 people. The village tract contains 2 villages.

Camp Thanbaya was a Japanese prisoner of war work camp during World War II. The camp was initially used for the construction of the Burma Railway, and was located 53 kilometres from Thanbyuzayat. It was originally a work camp which had fallen into disrepair. In June 1943, it was transformed into the ‘F' Force Hospital Camp. 1,700 sick prisoners were brought to Thanbaya, of which 700 died within six months. The camp was abandoned on 24 November 1943.
