= Pu Lein =

- Village
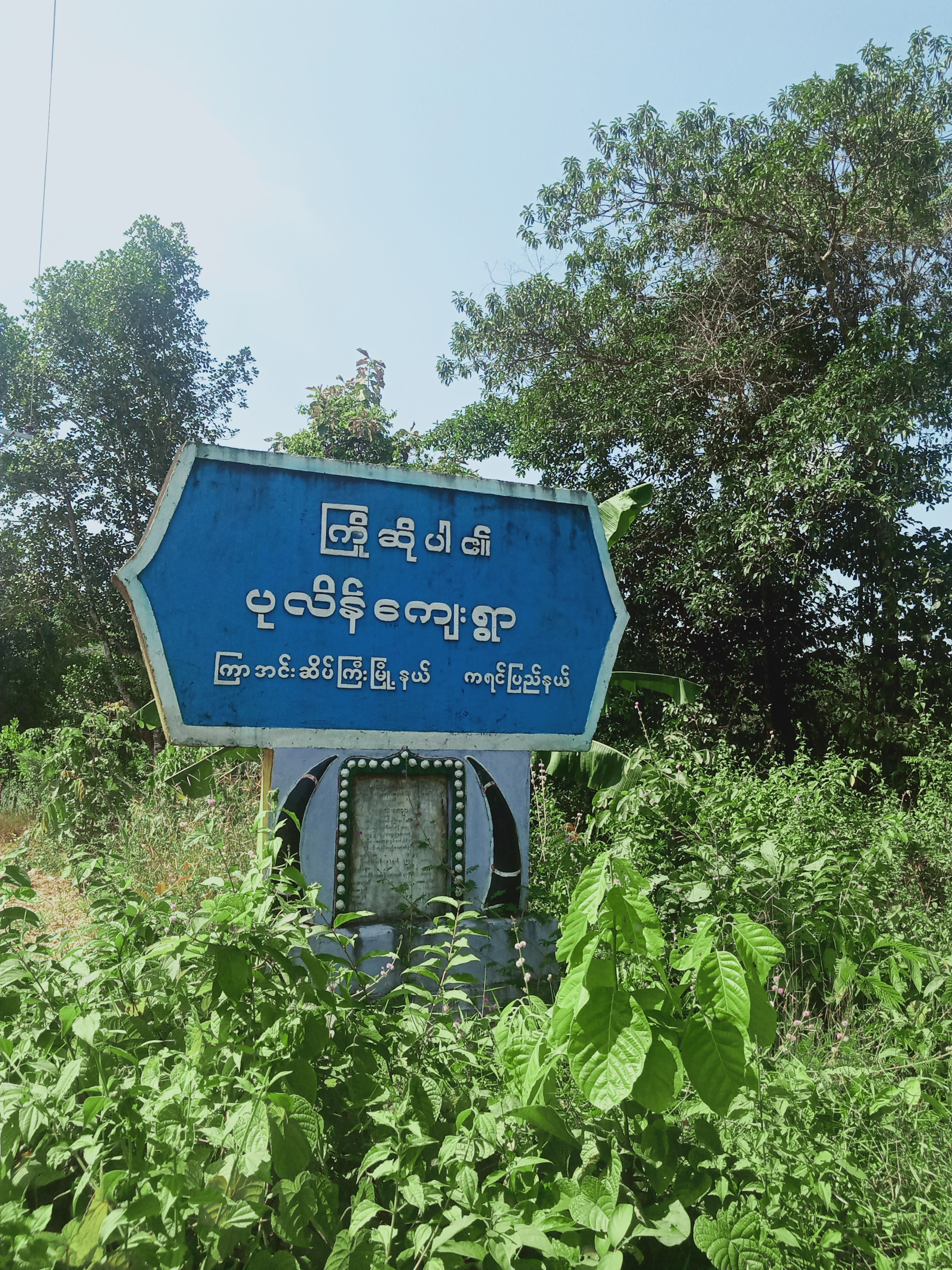

- Location in Burma
- Coordinates: 16°3′36″N 97°53′1″E
- Country: Burma
- State: Kayin State
- District: Kawkareik District
- Township: Kyain Seikgyi Township
- Time zone: UTC+6.30 (MST)
- Area code: 58

Pu Lein is a village in Kyain Seikgyi Township, Kawkareik District, in the Kayin State of Myanmar. It is located east side of the Tenasserim Range and west of Tagundaing in Kayin State along Ta Khun Taing - Abit Road.
