= Karesaw =

- Location in Myanmar
- Coordinates: 15°46′0″N 98°2′0″E
- Country: Myanmar
- Division: Kayin State
- District: Kawkareik District
- Township: Kyain Seikgyi Township

Population (2014)
  - Religions: Buddhism
- Time zone: UTC+6.30 (MST)

Karesaw is a village in the Kyain Seikgyi Township of the Kayin State, Myanmar.
