= Paingkyon =

- Town
- Location in Myanmar
- Coordinates: 17°01′27″N 97°59′04″E
- Country: Myanmar
- State: Kayin State
- District: Hpa-an District
- Township: Hlaingbwe Township

Population (2014)
  - Total: 88,604
  - Religions: Buddhism
- Time zone: UTC+6.30 (MST)
- Area code: 58

Paingkyon (Burmese: ပိုင်ကျုံမြို့) Eastern Pwo Karen:ဍုံပါင်ကၠ်ုis a town in Hlaingbwe Township, Hpa-an District, in the Kayin State of Myanmar.
