= Kyondoe =

Kyondoe ကျုံဒိုးမြို့ ဍုၚ်ကြုၚ်ဒဵု
- Town
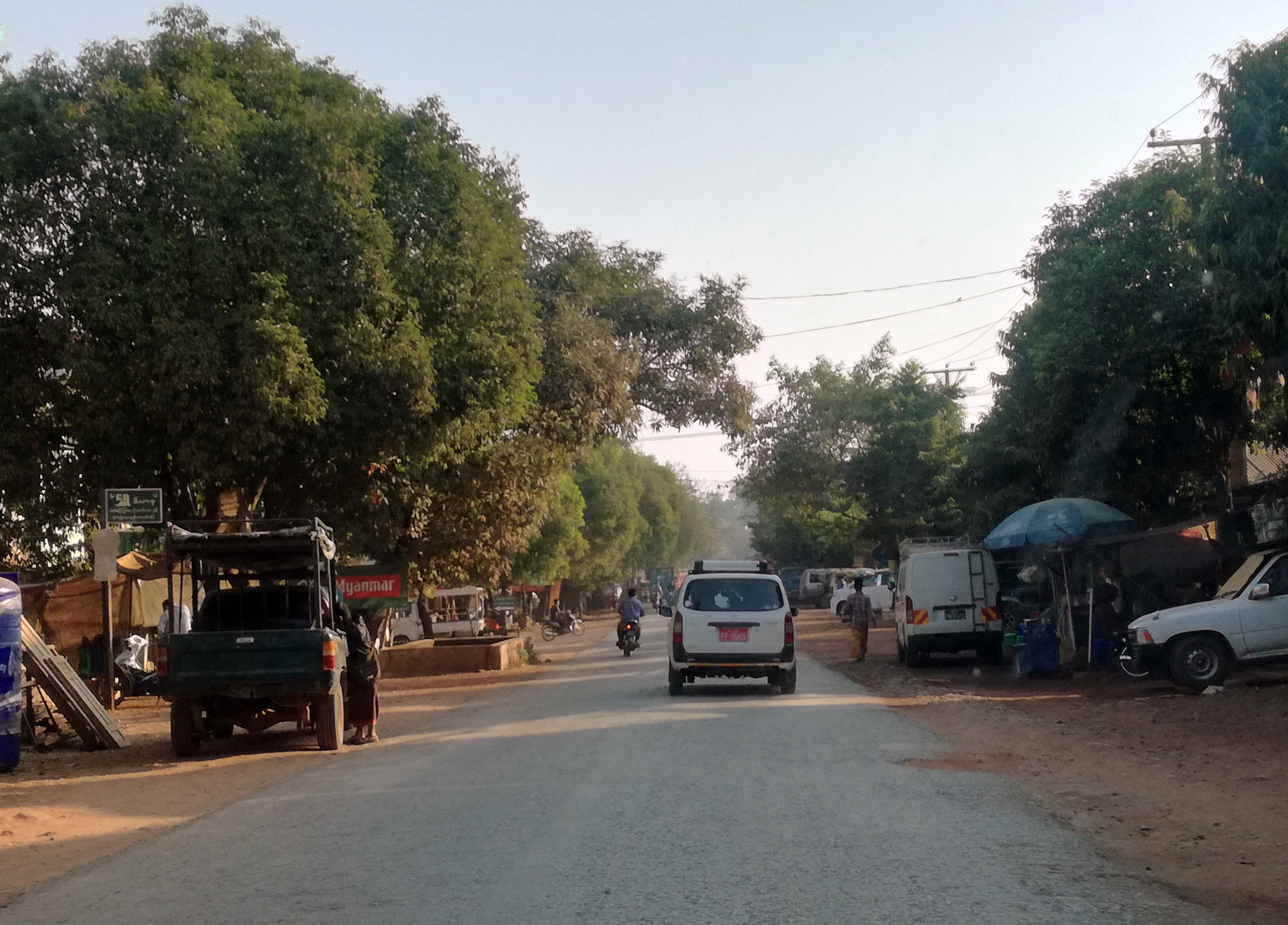

- Location within Myanmar (Burma)
- Coordinates: 16°35′40″N 98°02′37″E
- Country: Myanmar
- State: Kayin State
- District: Kawkareik District
- Township: Kawkareik Township
- Time zone: UTC+6:30 (MST)
- Area code: 58

Kyondoe (Burmese: ကျုံဒိုး ,Eastern Pwo Karen Phlone: ကၠ်ုတိုဒ်ႋ) is a town located within the Kawkareik District of Kayin State, Myanmar. It is located on the India–Myanmar–Thailand Trilateral Highway and eastern bank of Haungtharaw River.
