= Putaw =

- Location in Myanmar
- Coordinates: 15°42′0″N 98°1′0″E
- Country: Myanmar
- State: Kayin State
- District: Kawkareik District
- Township: Kyain Seikgyi Township

Population
  - Religions: Buddhism
- Time zone: UTC+6.30 (MST)
- Area code: 58

Putaw is a village in Kyain Seikgyi Township, Kawkareik District, in the Kayin State of Myanmar.
