= Peinnegon =

Peinnegon is the name of the following places in Kyain Seikgyi Township, Kawkareik District, in the Kayin State of Myanmar:

- Peinnegon (16°22'0"N 98°19'0"E)
- Peinnegon (16°15'0"N 98°21'0"E)

== See also ==
- Peinhnegon, village in Homalin Township, Hkamti District, Sagaing Region
