= Kanni II, Kyain Seikgyi =

Kanni ကအ်ဗိုတ် ကမ်းနီ
- Location in Burma
- Coordinates: 16°33′47″N 98°01′05″E
- Country: Burma
- Division: Kayin State
- District: Kawkareik District
- Township: Kawkareik Township

Population
  - Religions: Buddhism and Christianity
- Time zone: UTC+6.30 (MST)
- Area code: 58

Kanni is a large village in Kawkareik Township of northern Kyain Seikgyi Township, Kawkareik District, in the Kayin State of Myanmar. It lies on the left (western) bank of the Haungtharaw (Haungthayaw) River just upstream (south) of where it flows into the Gyaing River.
