= Peinhneseik =

Peinhneseik ပိန္နဲဆိပ်
- Location in Myanmar
- Coordinates: 16°15′0″N 98°21′0″E
- Country: Myanmar
- State: Kayin State
- District: Kawkareik District
- Township: Kyain Seikgyi Township
- Village tract: Kyawt Saing

Population
  - Religions: Buddhism
- Time zone: UTC+6.30 (MMT)
- Area code: 58

Pein Hne Seik (Burmese: ပိန္နဲဆိပ်) is a village in northeastern Kyain Seikgyi Township, Kawkareik District, in the Kayin State of Myanmar. It lies on the foothills of the Dawna Range in Kyawt Saing village tract.
