= Phabya =

- Village
- Location in Myanmar
- Coordinates: 15°50′12″N 097°57′00″E
- Country: Burma
- State: Kayin State
- District: Kawkareik District
- Township: Kyain Seikgyi Township
- Time zone: UTC+6.30 (MST)

Phabya (S'gaw Karen: ဖါ့ပၠ; Mon: ဖာဗြ; Burmese: ဖားပြ) is a large village in Kyain Seikgyi Township of Kawkareik District, Kayin State, south-eastern Myanmar. It lies on the Phabya Chaung.

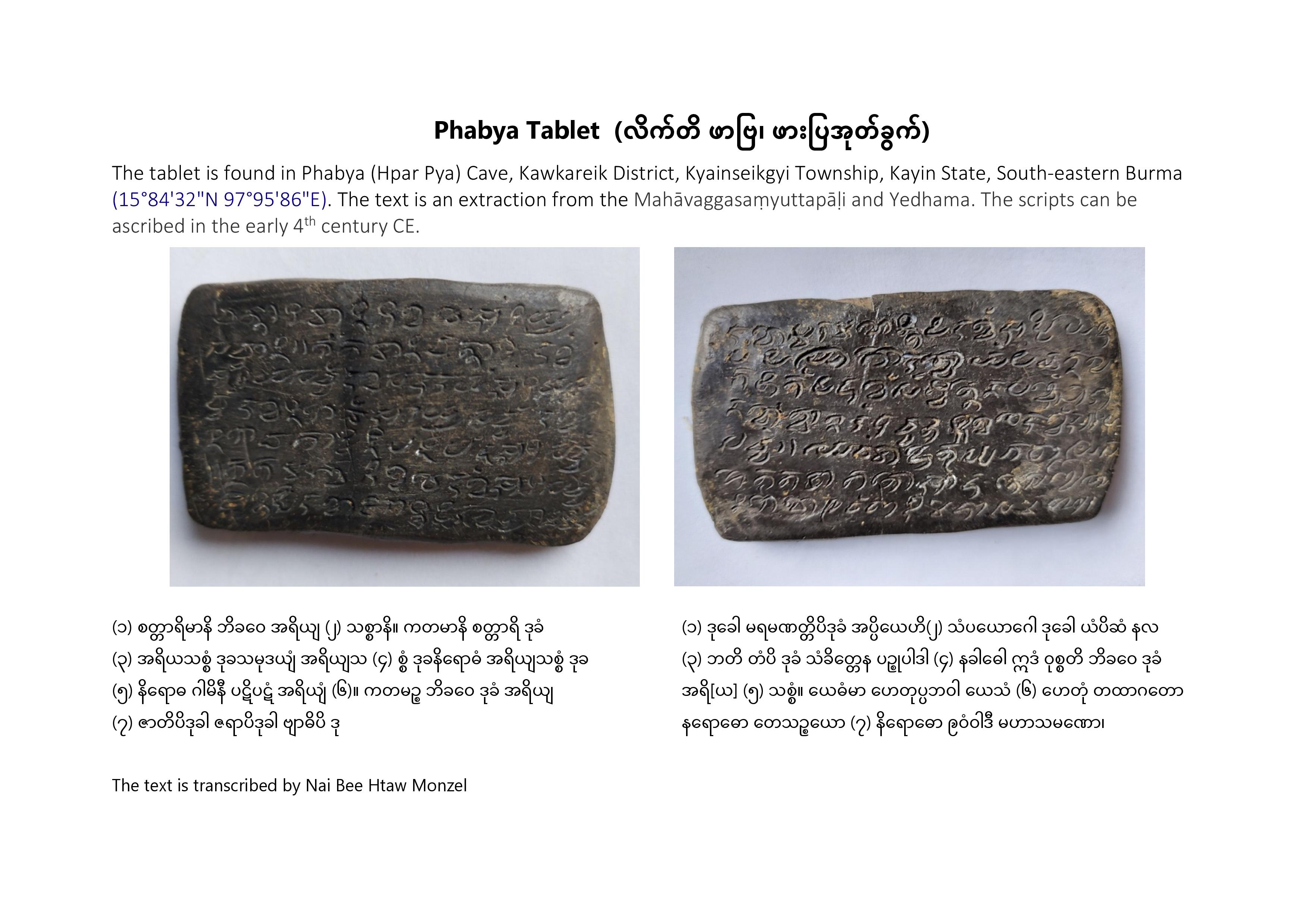
