= Kawankathaung =

Kawankathaung ကွမ်ကသောင်
- Location in Myanmar (Burma)
- Coordinates: 16°5′5″N 97°58′16″E
- Country: Burma
- Division: Kayin State
- District: Kawkareik District
- Township: Kyain Seikgyi Township

Population
  - Religions: Buddhism
- Time zone: UTC+6.30 (MST)

Kawankathaung is a village in the Kawkareik District of the Kayin State, Myanmar, located on the east bank of the Winyaw River.
