= Hlarkada =

Hlarkada Kata
- Location in Myanmar (Burma)
- Coordinates: 15°59′19.72″N 97°58′52.21″E
- Country: Myanmar
- Division: Kayin State
- District: Kyain Seikgyi District
- Township: Kyain Seikgyi Township
- Time zone: UTC+6.30 (MMT)
- Area code: 58

Hlarkada is a village in the Kayin State of southern Myanmar. It lies on the eastern bank of the Winyaw River about two kilometres.
