= Htimahto =

Htimahto ထိမံထို
- Village
- Location in Burma
- Coordinates: 16°1′51″N 97°57′18″E
- Country: Burma
- Division: Kayin State
- District: Kawkareik District
- Township: Kyain Seikgyi Township

Population (2014)
  - Religions: Buddhism
- Time zone: UTC+6.30 (MST)
- Area code: 58

Htimahto (Phlone: ထုဲးမင်ထောဝ်; Burmese: ထိမံထို) is a village in the Kayin State of the southernmost part of Myanmar.
