= Kanni I, Kyain Seikgyi =

Kanni ကမ်းနီ
- Location in Burma
- Coordinates: 15°42′N 98°11′E
- Country: Burma
- Division: Kayin State
- District: Kawkareik District
- Township: Kyain Seikgyi Township
- Elevation: 112 ft (34 m)

Population (2014)
  - Total: 1,460
  - Religions: Buddhism
- Time zone: UTC+6.30 (MST)
- Area code: 58

Kanni (Burmese: ကမ်းနီ) is a village in Kyain Seikgyi Township, Kawkareik District, in the Kayin State of Myanmar. It is located on the Zami River.
