= Sukali =

- Location in Myanmar
- Coordinates: 16°9′16″N 98°35′46″E
- Country: Myanmar
- State: Kayin State
- District: Myawaddy District
- Township: Myawaddy Township

Population (2014)
  - City: 5,703
  - Urban: 342
  - Rural: 5,361
  - Religions: Buddhism
- Time zone: UTC+6.30 (MST)
- Area code: 58

Sukali (Burmese: စုကလိမြို့) is a town in Myawaddy Township, Myawaddy District, in the Kayin State of Myanmar.
