= Phathalē =

Phathalē ဖားတလယ်
- Location of Phathalē in Myanmar
- Coordinates: 16°2′20″N 97°59′0″E
- Country: Burma
- Division: Kayin State
- District: Kawkareik District
- Township: Kyain Seikgyi Township

Population
  - Religions: Buddhism
- Time zone: UTC+6.30 (MST)

Phathalē (Burmese: ဖားတလယ် [pʰa̰dɛ̀lɛ̀]) is a village in the Kyain Seikgyi Township, Kawkareik District, Kayin State of south-eastern part of Myanmar.
