= Wawlay =

Wawlay ဝေါလေမြိုင်မြို့
- Location in Myanmar (Burma)
- Coordinates: 16°17′38″N 98°42′48″E
- Country: Myanmar
- State: Kayin State
- District: Myawaddy District
- Township: Myawaddy Township

Population (2014)
  - City: 9,213
  - Urban: 3,083
  - Rural: 6,130
  - Religions: Buddhism and Christianity
- Time zone: UTC+6.30 (MMT)
- Area code: 58

Wawlay (Burmese: ဝေါလေမြိုင်မြို့) is a town in Myawaddy Township, Myawaddy District, in Kayin State, Myanmar.
