= Kyauk Bi Lu =

Kyauk Bi Lu ကျောက်ဘီလူး
- Village
- Location within Myanmar
- Coordinates: 15°41′N 98°4′E
- Country: Myanmar
- State: Kayin State
- District: Kawkareik District
- Township: Kyain Seikgyi Township

Population (2014)
  - Total: 8,350
- Time zone: UTC+6:30 (MST)

Kyauk Bi Lu or Kyaukbilu(Burmese: ကျောက်ဘီလူး) is a village tract of Kyain Seikgyi Township, Kawkareik District, in Kayin State, Myanmar (Burma). In 2014 it had a total population of 8,350 people. The village tract contains four villages.

During World War II, the prisoner of war camps Ronsi (also Lonsi) and Mezali were located in Kyauk Bi Lu on the Burma Railway.

Camp Mezali was a work camp located 70 kilometres from Thanbyuzayat. There were two subcamps: Upper Mezali en Kami Mezali. The first prisoners arrived on 11 March 1943. The camp contained a large number of Dutch, British and some Australian prisoners of wars. It was abandoned by December 1943.
