= Lutshan =

- Location in Myanmar
- Coordinates: 15°48′N 97°54′E
- Country: Myanmar
- State: Kayin State
- District: Kawkareik District
- Township: Kyain Seikgyi Township

Population (2014)
  - Religions: Buddhism
- Time zone: UTC+6.30 (MST)
- Area code: 58

Lutshan (S'gaw Karen: လောတ်ယှင်ႋ; Burmese: လွှတ်ရှမ်း) is a village in Kyain Seikgyi Township (also called Win-Yay Township in Karen language), Kawkareik District, in the Kayin State of Myanmar.
