= Bawgali =

Bawgali ဘောဂလိ
- Town
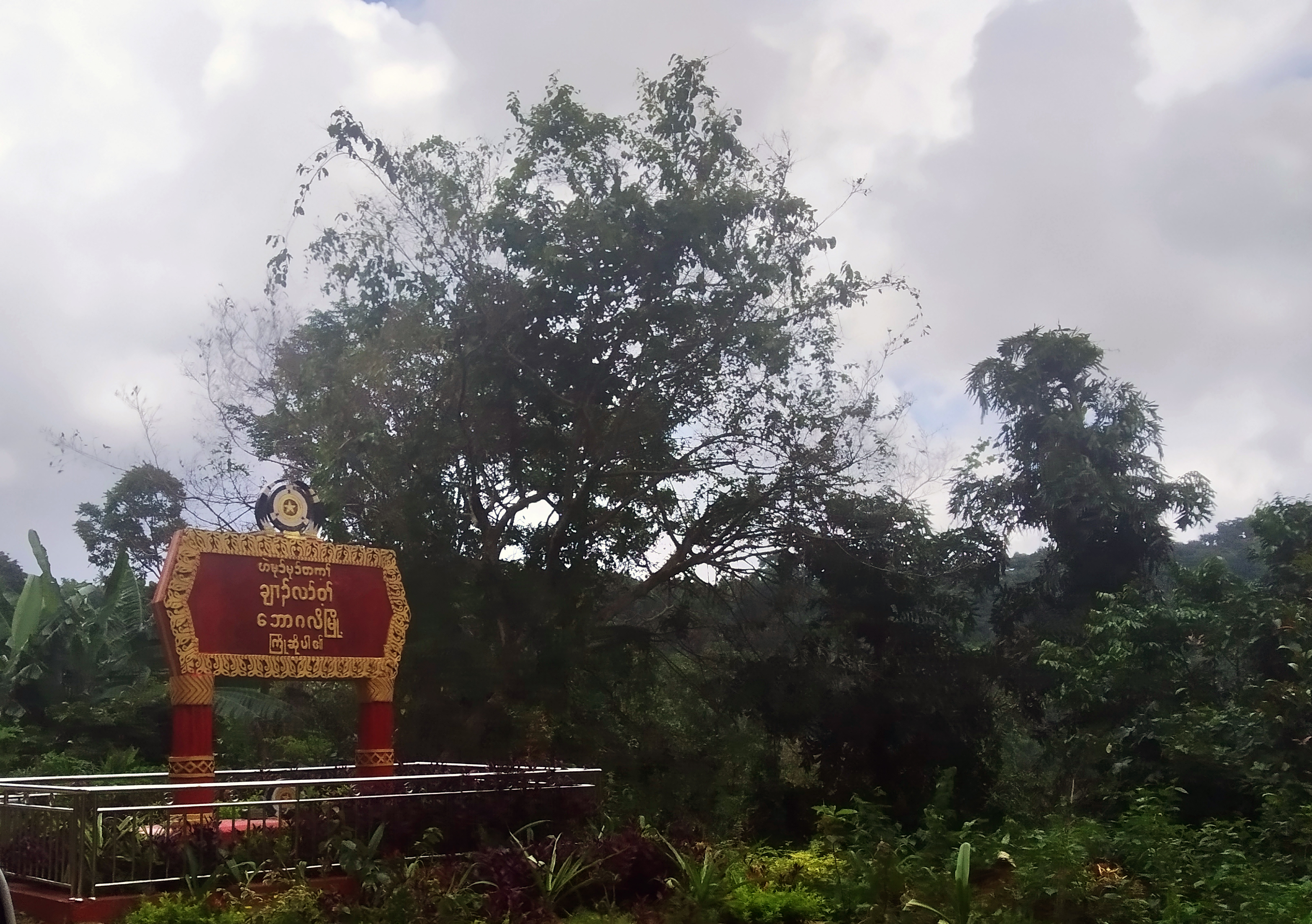

- Location within Myanmar (Burma)
- Coordinates: 18°54′52″N 96°47′08″E
- Country: Myanmar
- State: Kayin State
- District: Hpa-an District
- Township: Thandaunggyi Township

Population (2014)
  - Total: 17,237
- Time zone: UTC+6:30 (MMT)

Bawgali (Burmese: ဘောဂလိ) is a town in Hpa-an District, Kayin State of Myanmar. According to 2014 Myanmar Census, the total population in Bawgali is 17,237.
