= Kale-Tagundaing Station Hospital =

Kale - Tagondaing Station Hospital

Geography
- Location: Kale, Tagondaing, Kayin State, Myanmar
- Coordinates: 16.075°N 97.9028°E

Services
- Emergency department: Yes
- Beds: 16

History
- Opened: 1967

Kale - Tagondaing Station Puplic Hospital (Burmese: ခလယ် - တံခွန်တိုင်တိုက်နယ် ပြည်သူ့ဆေးရုံ [kʰa̰ lɛ dəɡʊ̀ɴ tàɴ daiqneh pjìðṵs’e´youn], also spelled as Khale - Tagundaing Station Hospital) is a public hospital in Kale, Tagondaing, Kyain Seikgyi Township, Kayin State, Myanmar.

== History ==
Kale-Tagundaing Station Hospital was formerly opened as Rural health Department. It had been transformed as Public hospital from 31 August 1967 and then it had been upgraded as Station Hospital on 1969.

In 2015, a new building with 20 beds were developed.
