= Kyeikdon =

Kyeikdon ကျာ်ဍုၚ်
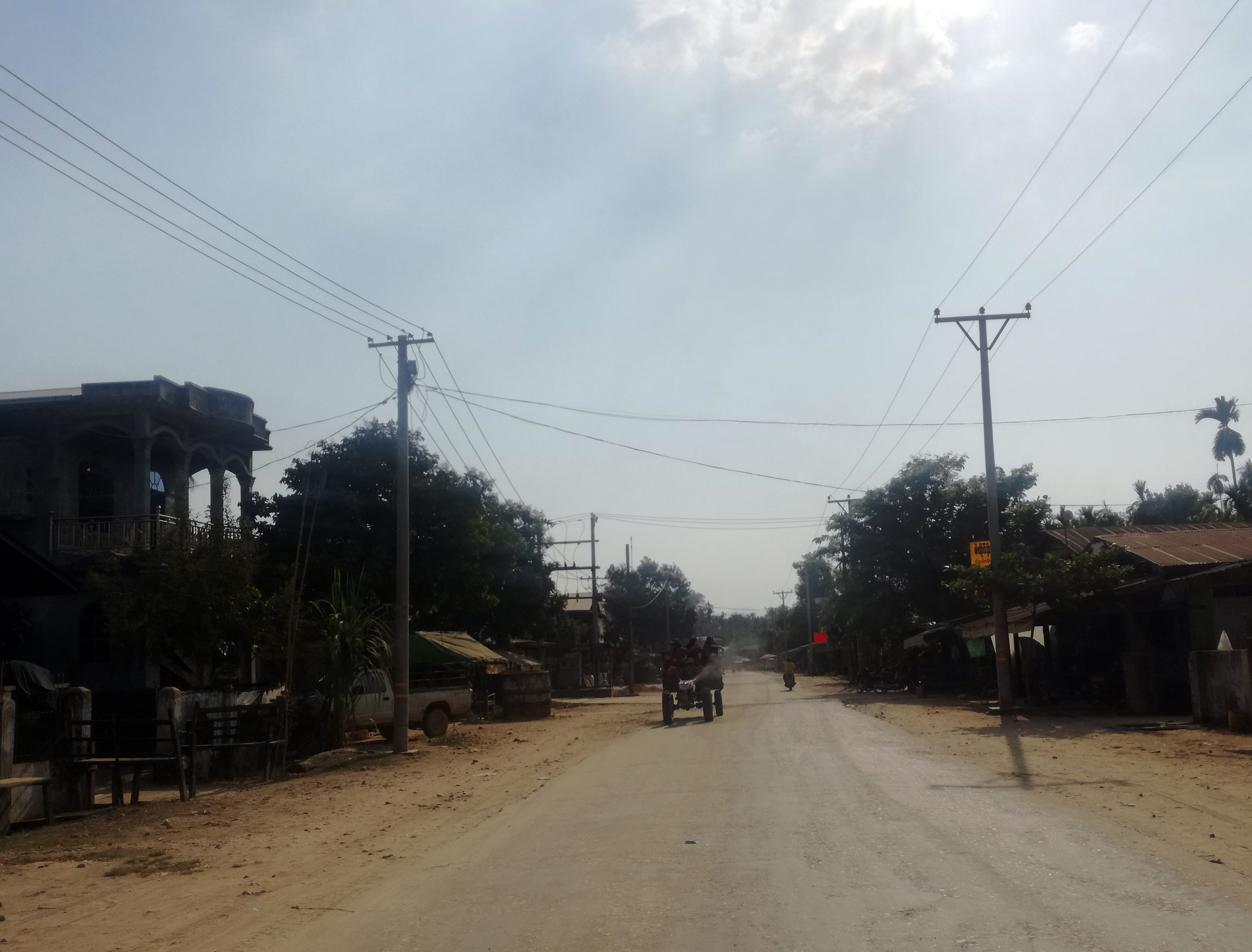

- Location in Myanmar (Burma)
- Coordinates: 16°00′09″N 98°24′09″E
- Country: Myanmar
- Division: Kayin State
- District: Kawkareik District
- Township: Kyain Seikgyi Township
- Subtownship: Kyaik done Subtownship
- Elevation: 82 ft (25 m)

Population (2014)
  - Urban: 3,515
- Time zone: UTC+6.30 (MMT)
- Area code: 58

Kyeikdon (Phlone: ကျာ်ဍုံ [tɕaiʔtòʊɰ̃] Mon : ဍုၚ်ကျာ်ဍုၚ် ) also spelled Kyaikdon, is a town in Kayin State, Myanmar. It is located on the eastern bank of Haungtharaw River. The government offices of Kyeikdon Subtownship are located in Kyeikdon. The majority of the town population is Karen. On 19 May 2024, the Karen National Union took control of the town.
