= Myoe Haung =

Myoe Haung မြို့ဟောင်း Doh -Li
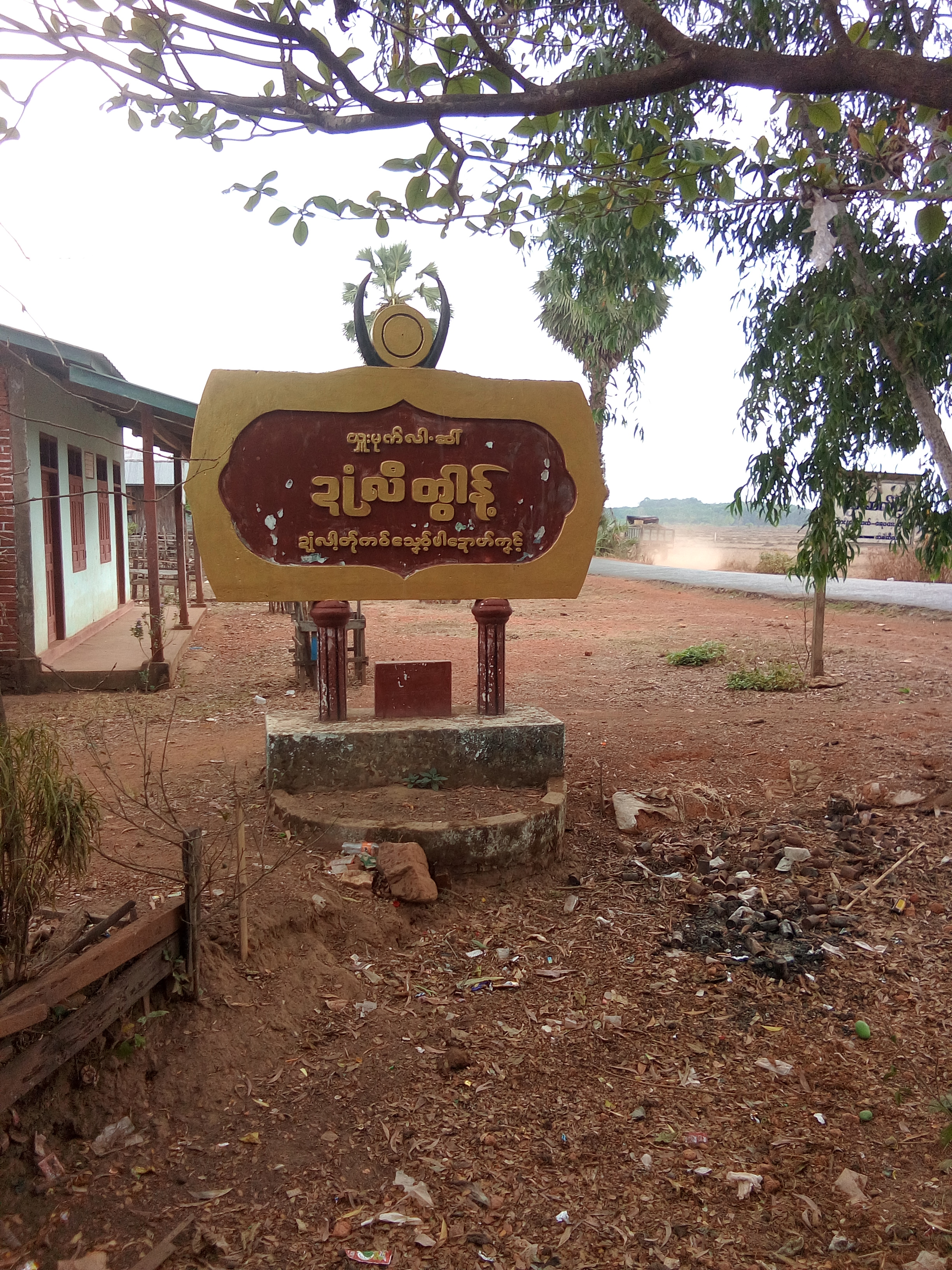
- Myohaung welcome signboard

- Location in Myanmar
- Coordinates: 16°06′59″N 97°53′50″E
- Country: Myanmar
- State: Kayin State
- District: Kawkareik District
- Township: Kyain Seikgyi Township

Population
  - Religions: Buddhism
- Time zone: UTC+6.30 (MST)
- Area code: 58

Myoe Haung or Myohaung (Pwo Eastern Karen: ဍုံလီ; Burmese: မြို့ဟောင်း [mjo̰ ha̰ʊN]) is a village in Kyain Seikgyi Township, Kawkareik District, in the Kayin State of Burma (Myanmar). It is on the Sadaw Marsh (Sadaw Chaung), eastern part of the foothills of the Tenasserim Range.
