= Kyongawon =

Kyongawon ကျုံခဝန်
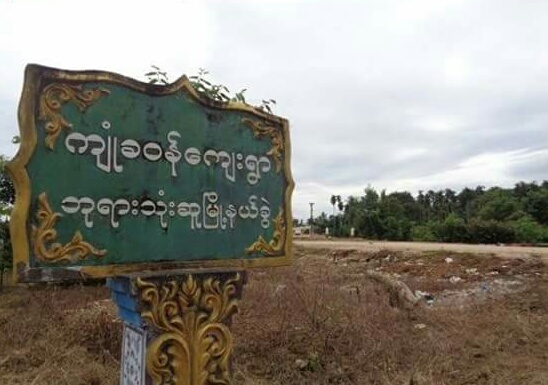
- Kyongawon welcome signboard

- Location in Myanmar
- Coordinates: 15°54′0″N 97°56′0″E
- Country: Myanmar
- State: Kayin State
- District: Kawkareik District
- Township: Kyain Seikgyi Township

Population
  - Religions: Buddhism
- Time zone: UTC+6.30 (MST)
- Area code: 58

Kyongawon (Burmese: ကျုံခဝန်) is a village in Kyain Seikgyi Township, Kawkareik District, in the Kayin State of Myanmar. It lies on the Kyungawon Chaung, which runs from west to east through the village.
