= Taungdi =

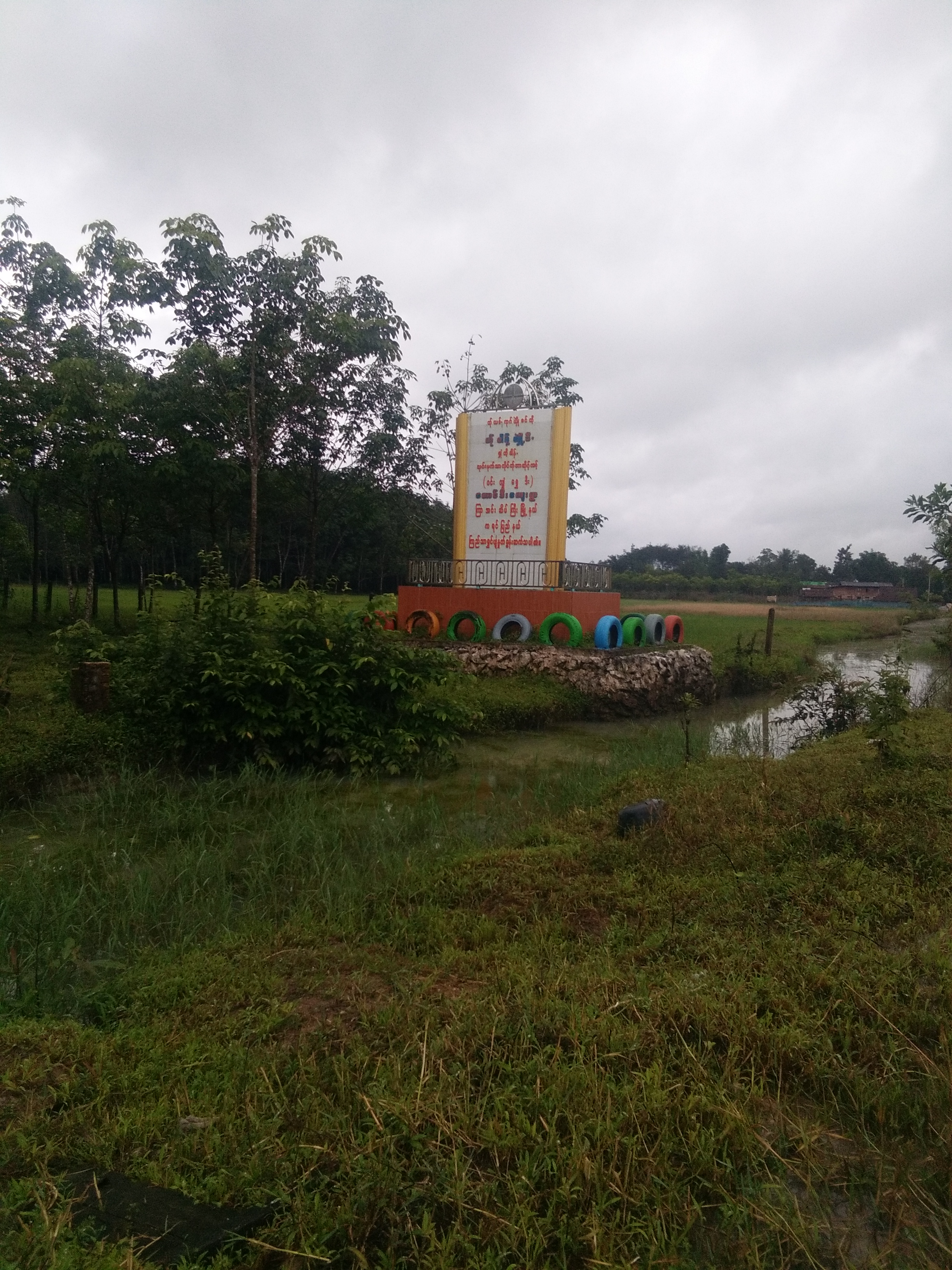

- Location in Myanmar
- Coordinates: 15°58′44″N 97°55′11″E
- Country: Myanmar
- State: Kayin State
- District: Kawkareik District
- Township: Kyain Seikgyi Township

Population (2014)
  - Religions: Buddhism
- Time zone: UTC+6.30 (MST)
- Area code: 58

Taungdi Pwo Eastern Karen: တံင့်တီႋ; Burmese: တောင်ဒီး [tàʊɴ Dí]) is a large village in Kyain Seikgyi Township, Kawkareik District, in the Kayin State of Myanmar.
