= Akalaw =

- Village
- Location in Myanmar
- Coordinates: 16°8′18″N 97°58′4″E
- Country: Myanmar
- State: (Kayin State) Karen State
- District: Kawkareik District
- Township: Kyain Seikgyi Township

Population
  - Religions: Buddhism
- Time zone: UTC+6.30 (MST)
- Area code: 58

Akalaw (Burmese: အကလော [ʔa̰ka lɔ]) is a village in Kyain Seikgyi Township, Kawkareik District, in the Kayin State of Myanmar. It is near the convergence of the Winyaw and Zami Rivers.
