= Basic Education High School Ta Khun Taing =

Coordinates: 16°4′31″N 97°54′16″E

Basic Education High School Tagondaing
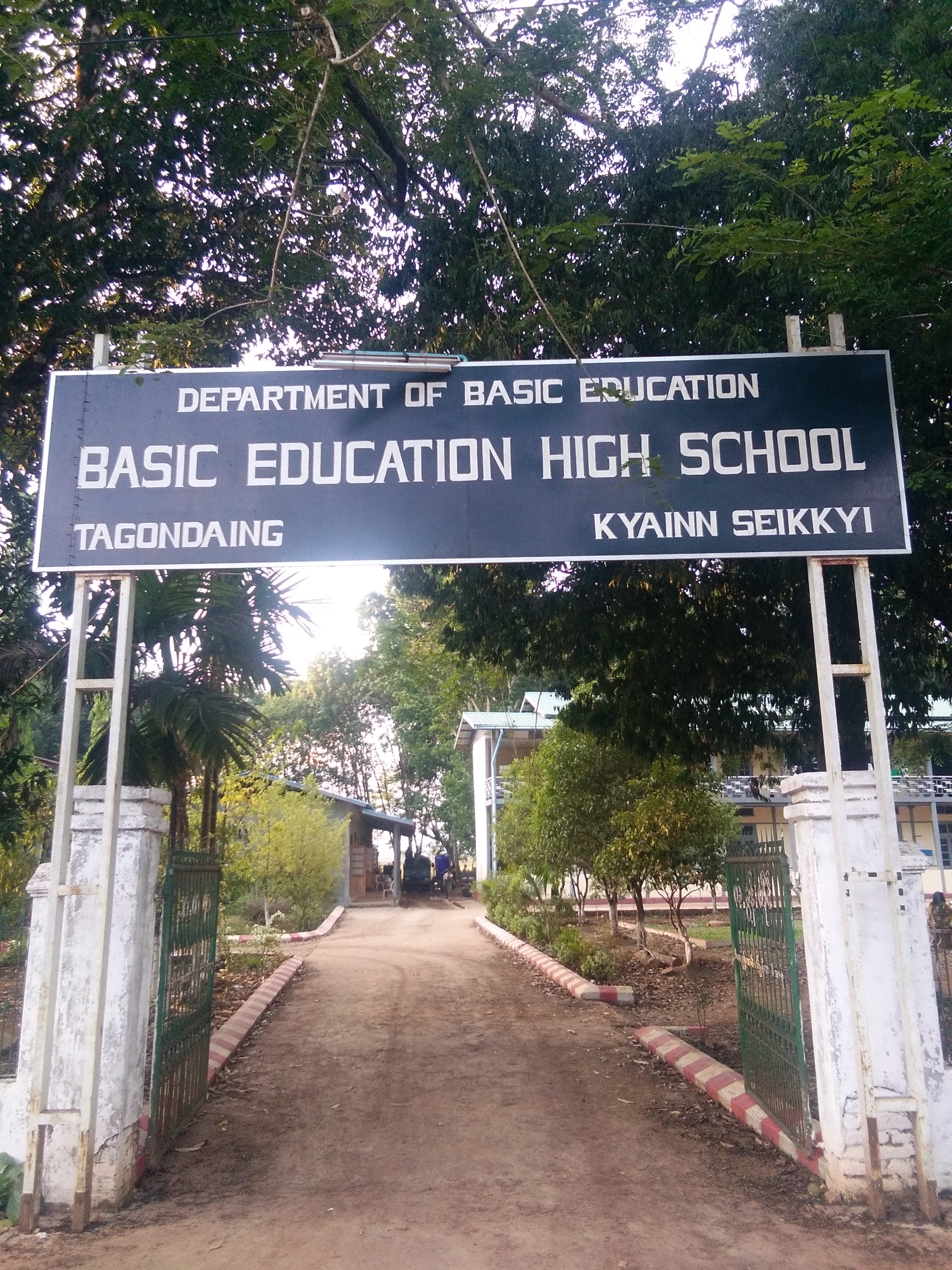
- B.E.H.S (Tagundaing)

Location
- Kale, Tagondaing; Kayin State; Myanmar

Information
- Type: Public
- Established: 1962
- Principal: Tin Myo
- Grades: Grades 6 to 12

Basic Education High School Tagondaing (Burmese: အခြေခံပညာအထက်တန်းကျောင်း တံခွန်တိုင်; pronounced [a˘c’igan pjìɲà a˘t’eq-ta´n cau´n dəɡʊ̀ɴ tàɴ]) is a public high school located in the Kale, Tagundaing, Kayin State, Myanmar. It offers classes from Grade 6 through Grade 12 in the new nomenclature.

== Uniform ==
Like all public schools in Myanmar, Kale, Tagondaing students wear school uniform. All uniforms are of the same colour - a white shirt or blouse, with a green garment for the bottom.

- School-boys wear a white shirt (with or without the collar), and a green longyi/Paso.
- School-girls must wear either a front opening (yin-zee) or side opening (yin-phone) traditional Burmese blouse, with the green longyi/Htamein as the lower garment.

== Buildings ==
BEHS Tagondaing consists of 6 buildings.

- Two-storey building (Main Building)
- Winyaw Building
- Sabal Building
- Thanlwin Building
- Pearl Building
- Myat Shwe Pyi Hall

== List of principals ==
| No. | Name | Year |
|---|---|---|
| 1 | Daw Hla Yee | 1962–1963 |
| 2 | Mahn Nyein Paye | 1963–1964 |
| 3 | Saw Nay Way Htoo | 1964–1967 |
| 4 | U Chit Han | 1967–1974 |
| 5 | Mahn Nyein Paye | 1975–1977 |
| 6 | Saw Khwe Htoo | 1977–1978 |
| 7 | Mahn Nyein Paye | 1978–1983 |
| 8 | U Khin Maung | 1984–1988 |
| 9 | U Aung San | 1989–1991 |
| 10 | Saw Khwe Htoo | 1991–1994 |
| 11 | U Ko Ko Zaw | 1994–1996 |
| 12 | Mahn Nyein Paye | 1996–2000 |
| 13 | Mahn Myat Khaing | 2000–2003 |
| 14 | Naw Parar K | 2003–2006 |
| 15 | Daw Ngwe Thein | 2006–2009 |
| 16 | Myint Myint Than | 2009–2010 |
| 17 | Daw Khin San Wai | 2010–2011 |
| 18 | U Tin Maung Ji | 2011–2014 |
| 19 | U Myint Tun | 2014–2018 |
| 20 | Naw Kho Ri Nar Shwe | 2018-2021 |
| 21 | U Tin Myo | 2021–present |

== Facilities ==
- Library room
- Multimedia classroom
- Science lab
- Computer classroom

== See also ==
- Basic Education High School in Myanmar
