= Technological University, Hpa-An =

University of technology in Kayin State, Myanmar

Technological University (Hpa-An)
- နည်းပညာ တက္ကသိုလ် (ဘားအံ)
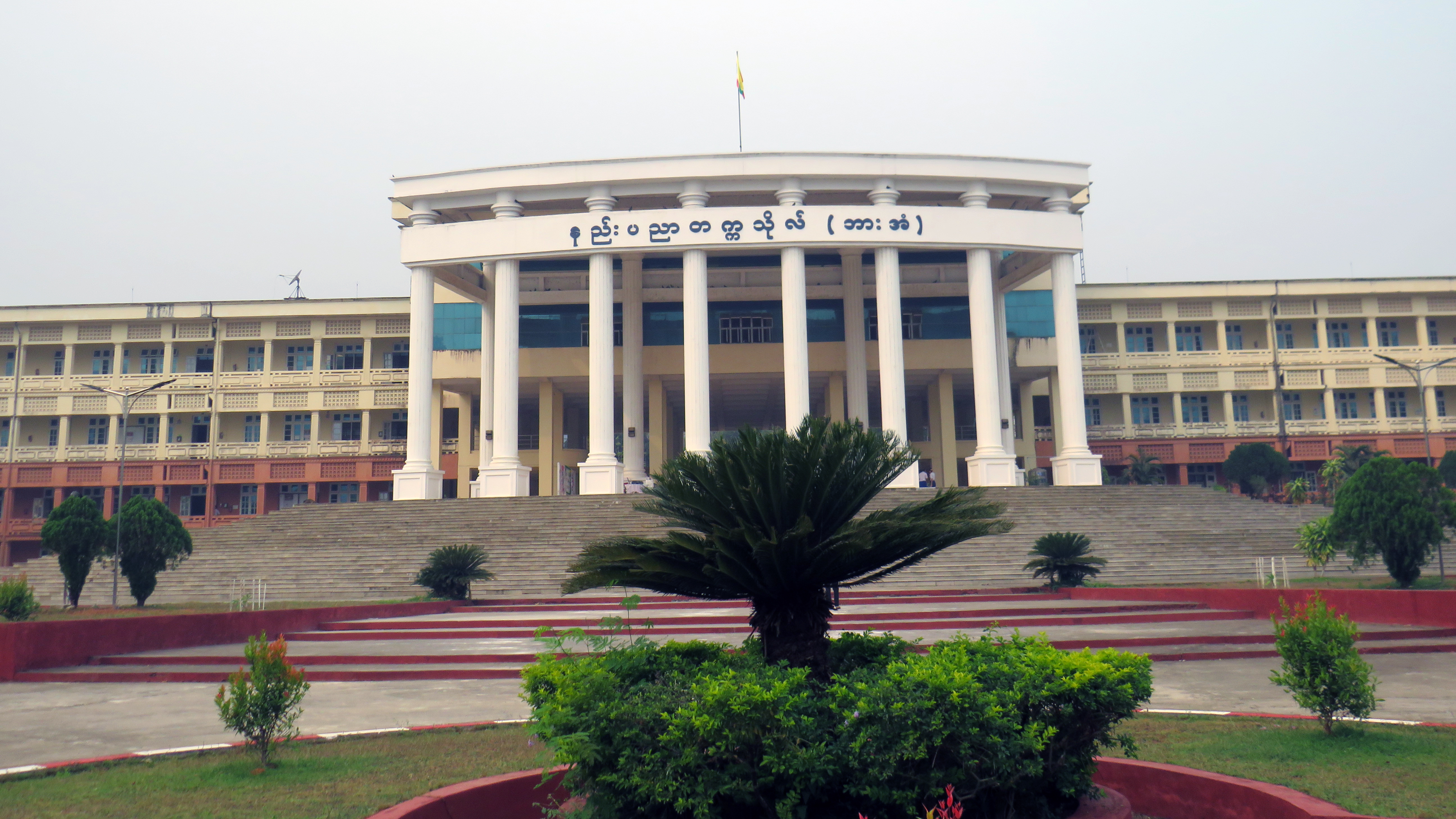
- Main building of the University
- Former names: Government Technical High School (Hpa-an) 1993; Government Technological Institute 1998
- Type: Public
- Established: 1993; 33 years ago
- Affiliations: Ministry of Education
- Acting Principal: Dr. Myo Min Zaw
- Location: Hpa-an Township, Kayin State, Myanmar; 16°51′05.4″N 97°38′39.1″E
- Campus: 35.19 acres (14.24 ha)
- Website: tuhpn.moe-st.gov.mm

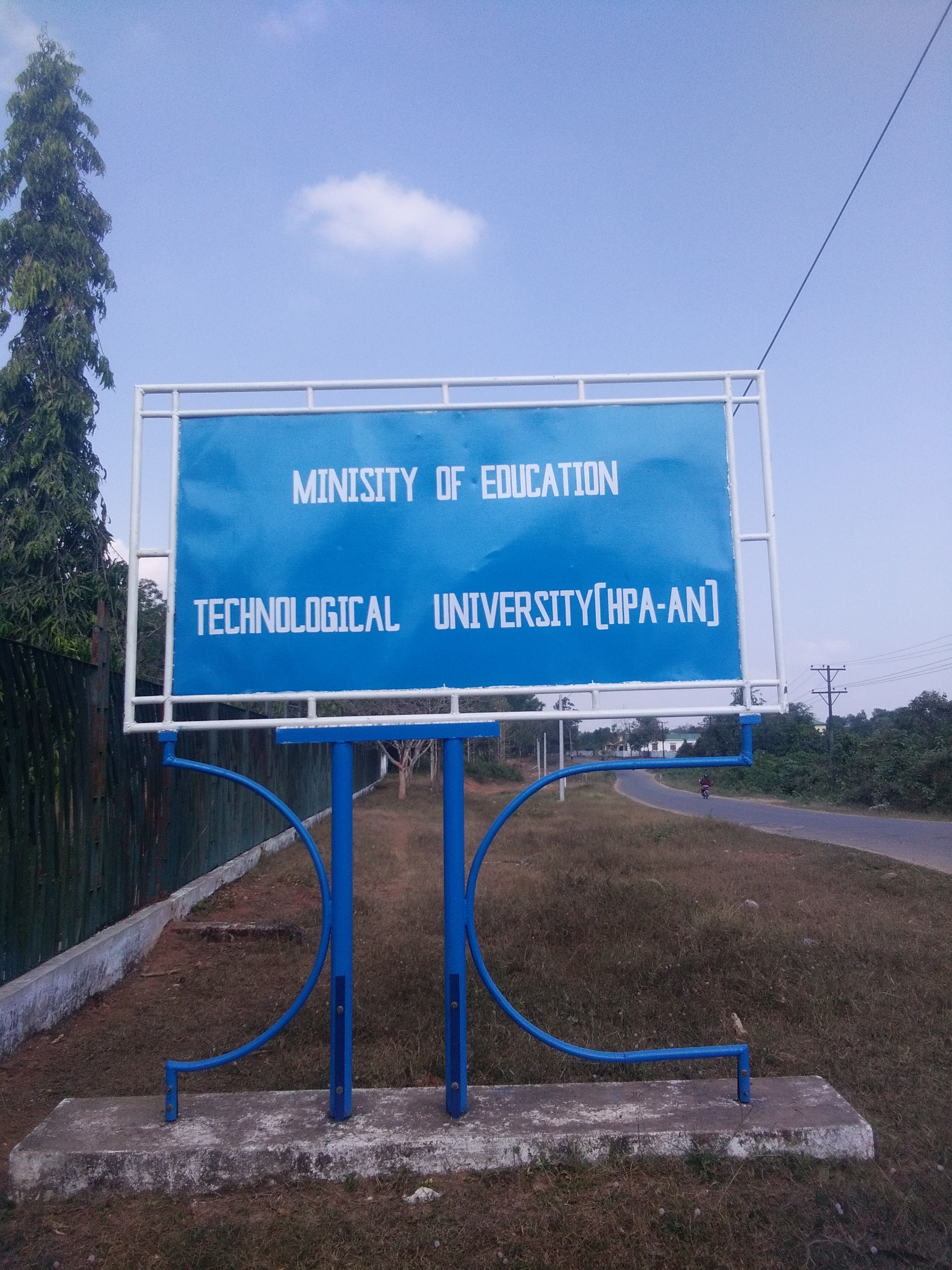
Technological University, Hpa-an

Technological University (Hpa-An) is a university under the Ministry of Science and Technology. It is located in Hpa-an Township, Kayin State, Myanmar.

== History ==
It was founded in 1993 as Government Technical High School (Hpa-an) along the (Hpa-an-Donyin) road in field No.(1185). It was upgraded as Government Technological Institute on 12 August 1998 and as Government Technological College on 28 December 2000. The board of Education Committee of Government of Union of Myanmar promoted the college to university level with effect from 20 January 2007.

== Department ==
- Civil Engineering Department
- Electronic and Communications Engineering Department
- Electrical Power Engineering Department
- Mechanical Engineering Department
- Academic Department

== Currently Running Engineering Courses ==
- Civil Engineering
- Electronic and Communication Engineering
- Electrical Power Engineering
- Mechanical Power Engineering

== Degree Programs ==
- Bachelor of Technology (B.Tech.)
- Bachelor of Engineering (B.E.)
- Master of Engineering (M.E.)
