= Burmese Tai peoples =

Grouping of ethnic peoples

Burmo-Tai, Tai-Burmans or Burmese Tai peoples is an ethnic designation of peoples living in Burma who are related to the Tai-Kadai ethnic group.

The following is a list of Tai ethnic groups within the political borders of Burma:

- Tai Yai (including the Khamti people)
- Dai (including the Lu people)
- Lao
- Tai Khun
- Tai Yong
- Tai Nuea (including the Tai Mao people)
- Tai Laeng
- Tai Phake
- Tai Piw
- Nara
- Tenasserim Thai
- Thai Yuan
- Thai people

== See also ==
- Austric languages
