= Hlaingbwe Township =

Coordinates: 17.1333°N 97.8333°E

Hlaingbwe Township လှိုင်းဘွဲ့မြို့နယ် လူၢ်ပျဲၢ်ကီၢ်ဆၣ် ပါ်စံင်ဍုံကၞင့်
- Township
- Location in Hpa-an district
- Country: Myanmar
- State: {{[flag|Kayin State}}
- District: Hpa-an District
- Capital: Hlaingbwe

Population (2014)
  - Total: 265,882
- Time zone: UTC+6:30 (MMT)

Hlaingbwe Township (Burmese: လှိုင်းဘွဲ့မြို့နယ်; Pwo Karen: ပါ်စံင်ကၞင့်; S'gaw Karen: လူၢ်ပျဲၢ်ကီၢ်ဆၣ်) is a township of Hpa-an District in the Kayin State of Myanmar. Hlaingbwe township is the third largest township in Karen State and its population was 265,883 in 2014. The principal town is Hlaingbwe.
