= Hpa-an District =

District of the Kayin State in Myanmar

Coordinates: 16°11′N 98°14′E

Hpa-An District (Phlone ထ်ုအင်ခြိုင့်; Burmese: ဘားအံခရိုင်, S'gaw Karen: ဖၣ်အၣ်ကီၢ်ရ့ၣ်) is a district of the Kayin State in Myanmar. It contains 5 towns and 1490 villages. 2014 population was 783,510.

Location in Kayin State highlighted in red. Hpa-An District consists of two non-contiguous sections.

== Townships ==
Prior to 2022, the district contained the following non-contiguous townships:

- Hpa-an Township
- Hlaingbwe Township
- Thandaunggyi Township

In 2022, the Ministry of Home Affairs split up Hpa-an District, turning Thandaunggyi Township into its own district.
