= Kayin State =

State of Myanmar

Kayin State ကရင်ပြည်နယ် (Burmese) ဖၠုံခါန်ႋကၞင့် (Pwo Eastern Karen) ကညီကီၢ်စဲၣ် (S'gaw Karen)
- State

Other transcription(s)
  - Karen: k'nyaw kawseh
  - Burmese: ka.rang pranynai
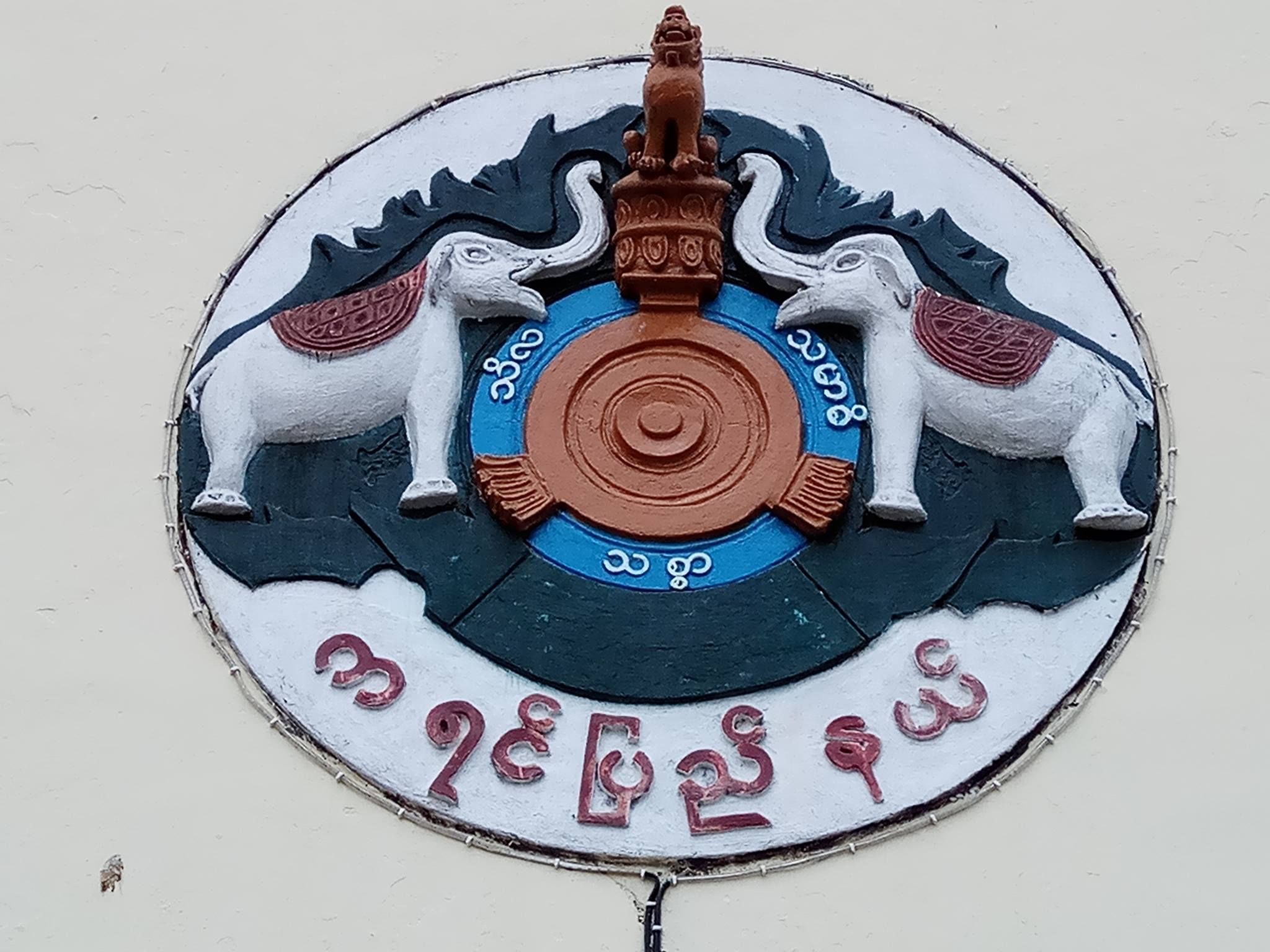
- Flag Seal

- Location of Kayin State in Myanmar
- Coordinates: 17°0′N 97°45′E
- Country: Myanmar
- Region: Lower
- Capital: Hpa-an
- Largest city: Hpa-an
- Before becoming State: Part of Tenasserim Division
- Establishment: 1948

Government
  - Chief Minister: Saw Myint Oo
  - Cabinet: Kayin State Government
  - Legislature: Kayin State Hluttaw
  - Judiciary: High Court of Kayin State

Area
  - Total: 30,382.8 km^{2} (11,730.9 sq mi)
  - Rank: 11th
- Highest elevation (Nattaung): 2,623 m (8,606 ft)

Population (2014 Census)
  - Total: 1,574,079
  - Rank: 11th
  - Density: 51.8082/km^{2} (134.183/sq mi)
- Demonym(s): Karen, Kayin

Demographics
  - Ethnicities: Karen (majority), Bamar, Shan, Pa-O, Mon, Rakhine, Kayan, Burmese-Thai
  - Religions: Buddhism 84.5% Christianity 9.5% Islam 4.6% Hinduism 0.6% Animism 0.1% Others 0.7%
- Time zone: UTC+06:30 (MMT)
- HDI (2017): 0.527 low · 12th
- Official language: Burmese (Official), Pwo Karen, S'gaw Karen (Recognized)
- Website: kayinstate.gov.mm

Kayin State, (Note: Burmese: ကရင်ပြည်နယ်, pronounced [kəjɪ̀ɴ pjìnɛ̀]; Pwo Eastern Karen: ဖၠုံခါန်ႋကၞင့်; S'gaw Karen: ကညီကီၢ်စဲၣ်, pronounced [kɲɔkɔshæ]) also known as Karen State, is a state and first-level administrative division of Myanmar. The capital city is Hpa-An, also spelled Pa-An.

The terrain of the state is mountainous, with the Dawna Range running along the state in a NNW–SSE direction, and the southern end of the Karen Hills in the northwest. It is bordered by the Mae Hong Son, Tak, and Kanchanaburi provinces of Thailand to the east; Mon State and Bago Region to the west and south; and Mandalay Region, Shan State and Kayah State to the north.

== History ==
The region that forms today's Kayin State was part of successive Burmese kingdoms since the formation of the Bagan Empire in the mid-11th century. During the 13th to 16th centuries, much of the region belonged to the Hanthawaddy kingdom, while the northern part of the region belonged to Taungoo (a vassal state of Ava Kingdom). The region became part of Taungoo Dynasty and Konbaung Dynasty, from 16th to the 19th centuries. The British seized the southern third of today's Kayin State (below the Salween River), after the First Anglo-Burmese War (1824-1826), and the rest after the Second Anglo-Burmese War of 1852.

Towards the end of the British colonial era (1945-1948), the Karen leadership insisted on a separate state covering today's Kayin State, much of Mon State and Taninthayi Region, within the British Empire. They refused to sign the Panglong Agreement of February 1947, which was the basis for the 1947 Constitution of Burma, and boycotted the pre-independence elections of April 1947. Nonetheless, the constitution granted the Karen a state, though with an area less than what the Karen leadership had asked for from the British. The constitution also guaranteed states the right to secede from the Union after a period of 10 years. (The Panglong Agreement gave only the Shan and the Kachin a state each; the Chin who actually signed the agreement did not receive a state.) The Karen National Union (KNU), which dominated the Karen leadership, was not satisfied and wanted outright independence. In 1949, the KNU raised a rebellion that continues up to today. The KNU celebrates January 31 as 'revolution day', marking the day they went underground at the battle of Insein.

Following the 1962 Burmese coup d'état, General Ne Win brokered a peace treaty with the Kawthoolei Revolutionary Council, a more nationalist group that split off from the KNU, on 12 March 1964. Within the treaty, Ne Win agreed to rename Kayin State into the more nationalist name, Kawthoolei State, and introduce ways within the new government to expand Kawthoolei to potentially include parts of Tanintharyi Division and Ayeyarwady Division. However, despite the KRC's call for the KNU to join them in this new future. The 1974 Constitution of Burma reverted the name of the state back to Kayin State.

Much of the state has been a battlefield since then. The civilians have taken the brunt of the war. The KNU today forms the world's longest-running resistance. The military government changed the English name of the state from Karen State to Kayin State in 1989.

Since 1976 the KNU has called for a federal system rather than an independent Karen State. In January 2012, Myanmar's military-backed civilian government signed a ceasefire deal with the KNU in Hpa-an, the capital of eastern Kayin State. Aung Min, the Railway Minister, and General Saw Chee Tik of the KNU led the peace talks.

== Geography ==
Located between latitudes 15° 45' north and 19° 25' north and longitudes 96° 10' east and 98° 28' east. It has a hot and humid climate because of the mountain ranges that lie in its backdrop and its location, which is near the sea, in the tropics. The temperature of the hottest month in eastern mountain regions never falls below 22.2 °C (71.9 °F). Lowlands in the west and south of the state are located in the tropical monsoon climate. The lowest annual rainfall in the region is 3,000 millimetres (120 in) and the highest is 4,800 millimetres (190 in). The regions get most of the rain in summer. Some of the rivers and creeks in Kayin State are flowing from south to north due to the location of the mountains. The main rivers in the state are Thanlwin (Salween River), Thaungyin (Moei River), Gyaing and Attaran.

== Government ==
The government of Kayin State is split into three branches: an executive (Kayin State Government), a legislative (Kayin State Hluttaw), and a judicial (Kayin State High Court).

The Kayin State Government is led by the Chief Minister of Kayin State, the Kayin State Hluttaw is led by the Speaker of the Kayin State Hluttaw, and the Kayin State High Court is led by the Chief Justice of the Kayin State High Court

== Administrative divisions ==
KayinState consists of one city and nine towns. It has four districts, seven townships and 4092 villages.

4 districts of Kayin

=== Districts ===
- Thandaunggyi District
- Hpapun District (ဖာပွန်ခရိုင်)
- Hpa-an District (ဘားအံခရိုင်)
- Myawaddy District (မြဝတီခရိုင်)
- Kawkareik District (ကော့ကရိတ်ခရိုင်)
- Kyain Seikgyi District

=== Townships ===
- Hpa-an Township (ဘားအံမြို့နယ်)
- Hlaingbwe Township (လှိုင်းဘွဲမြို့နယ်)
- Hpapun Township (ဖာပွန်မြို့နယ်)
- Thandaunggyi Township (သံတောင်ကြီးမြို့နယ်)
- Myawaddy Township (မြဝတီမြို့နယ်)
- Kawkareik Township (ကော့ကရိတ်မြို့နယ်)
- Kyainseikgyi Township (ကြာအင်းဆိပ်ကြီးမြို့နယ်)

=== Cities and towns ===
- Hpa-an (ဘားအံမြို့)
- Hlaingbwe (လှိုင်းဘွဲမြို့)
- Hpapun (ဖာပွန်မြို့)
- Thandaung (သံတောင်မြို့)
- Thandaunggyi (သံတောင်ကြီးမြို့)
- Myawaddy (မြဝတီမြို့)
- Kawkareik (ကော်ကရိတ်မြို့)
- Kyainseikgyi (ကြာအင်းဆိပ်ကြီးမြို့)
- Payathonsu (ဘုရားသုံးဆူမြို့)
- Kyaikdon (ကျိုက်ဒုံမြို့)
- Sukali (ဆူကာလီမြို့)
- Wawlay (ဝေါလေမြို့)
- Kamamaung (ကမမောင်းမြို့)
- Paingkyon (ပိုင်ကျုံမြို့)
- Shanywathit (ရှမ်းရွာသစ်မြို့)
- Bawgali (ဘောဂလီမြို့)

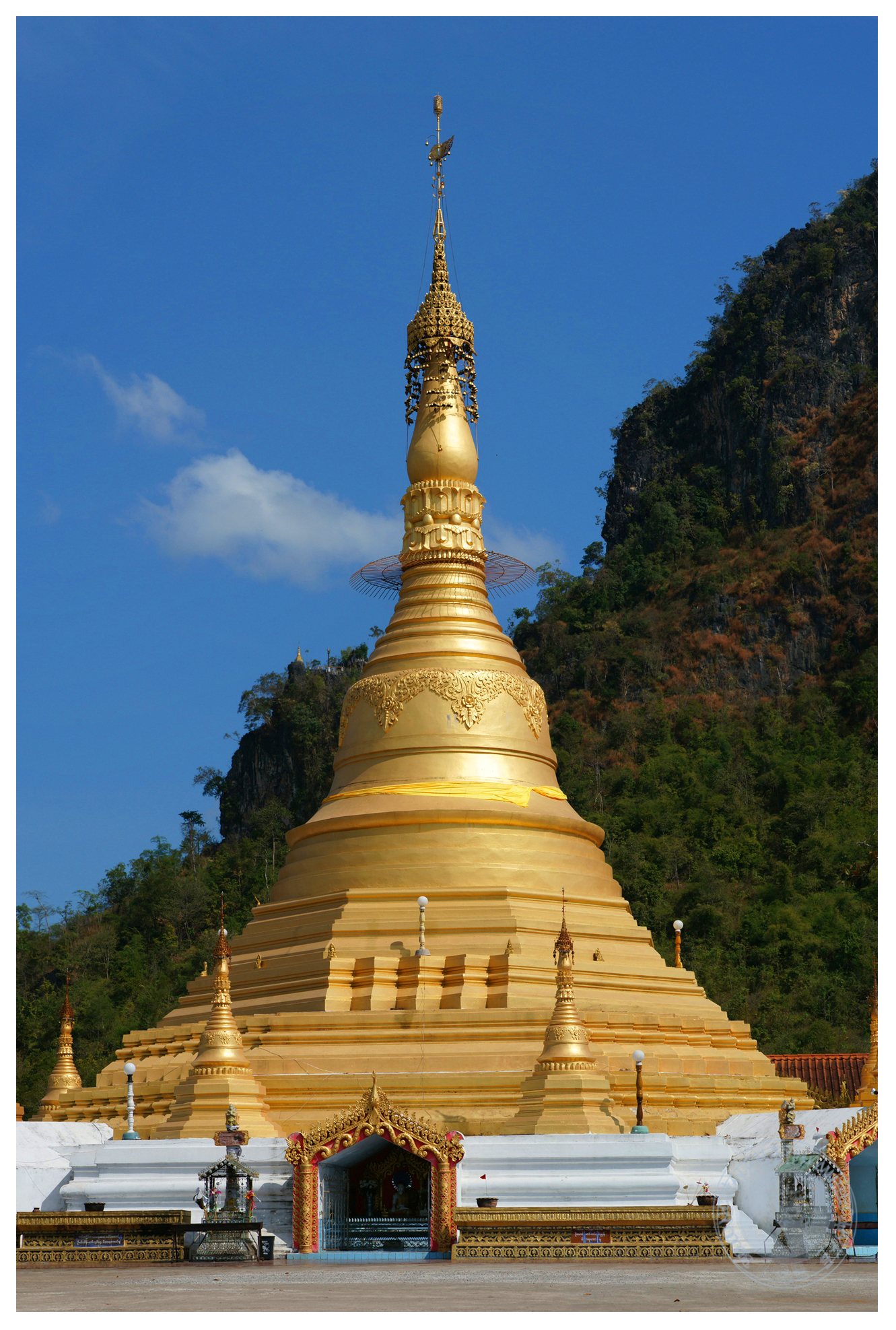
Payathonzu Pagoda

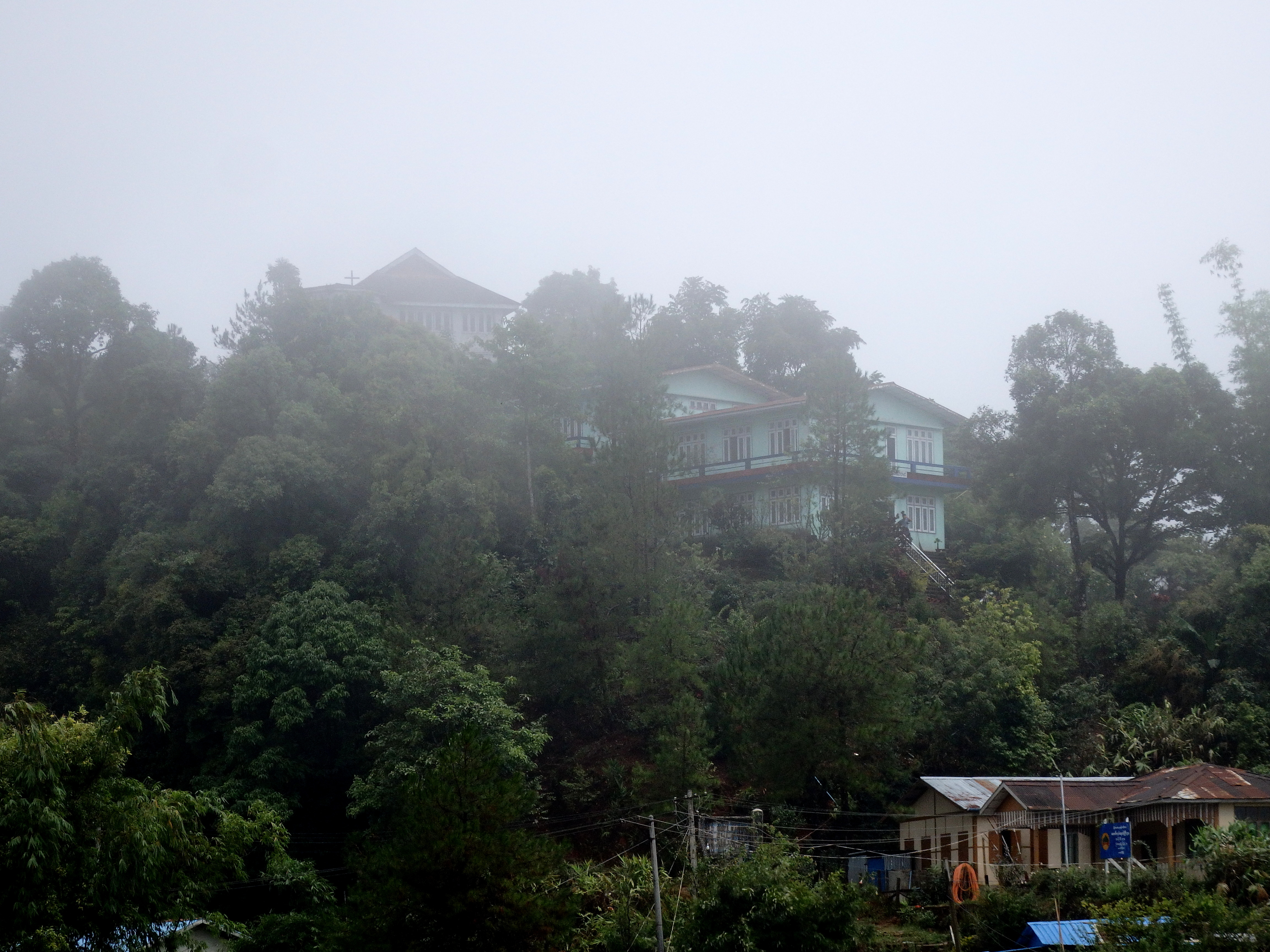
Mountainous area of Kayin State

=== Villages and hamlets ===
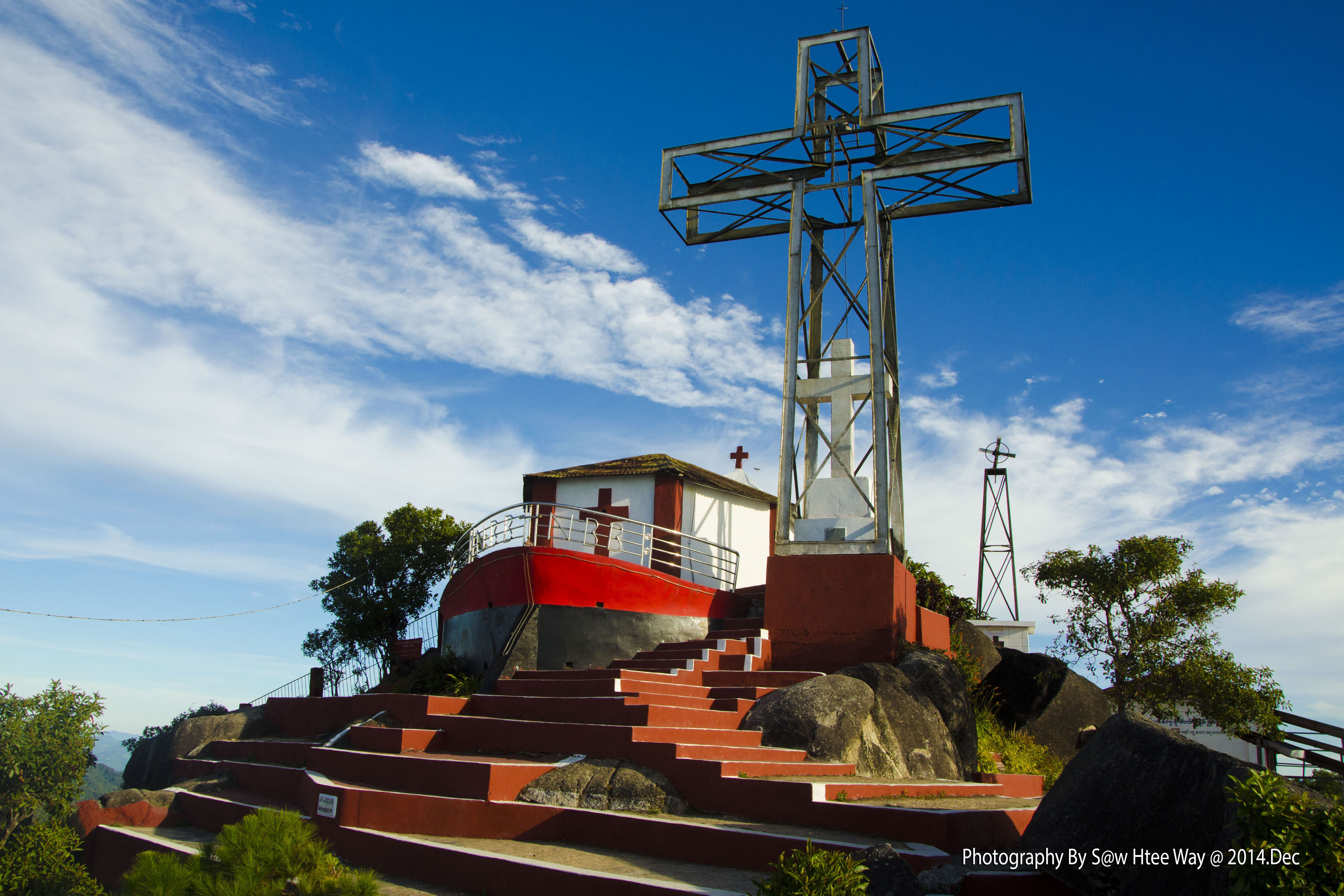
Cross on top of Naw Bu Baw Mountain, Kayin state

- Tagondaing
- Kale
- Htimahto
- Nan-Thaing-Tum
- Kyongawon
- Winpauk
- Taungdi
- Myohaung
- Anankwin
- Phabya
- Karesaw
- Kyaukbilu
- Pu Lein
- Kyeikywa
- Khonkhan
- Apalon
- Kanni I
- Htipalamaw
- Hlagazaing
- Kawankathaung
- Winhtaung
- Lutshan
- Paya-ngokto
- Katokkra
- Kaingdaw
- Peinnegon (16°15'0"N 98°21'0"E)
- Peinnegon (16°22'0"N 98°19'0"E)
- Kanni II
- Thabyegon
- Myaingkon
- Naungkwe
- Naungpalein
- Thanbaya
- Thabyu
- Retphaw
- Phadaw
- Winkana
- Nyeinchanmyine
- Htilonhpaung
- Doh-Li
- Duk Daw Nain
- Tamoowoug
- Akalaw
- Ywathit
- Kronwa
- Kyungyaung
- Tanyin
- Shitpyit (15°35'0"N 98°6'0"E)
- Shitpyit (15°36'0"N 98°6'0"E)
- Lonsi
- Missakit
- Na-awn
- Pyinmahtein
- Yapru
- Putaw
- Kalonhte
- Kyauk Bi Lu
- Phathalē
- Taungbauk
- Than Pu Yar (Thanbaya)
- War Sue
- Htee Huu Than
- Maw Khe Khee
- Mainmahlakyun
- Hlarkada

Due to the mountainous terrain in Kayin State, most villages are small and contain less than 40 households so a large amount of Karen's population is dotted across the countryside over hundreds, if not thousands of villages.

== Demographics ==
=== Population ===
Historical population
| Year | Pop. | ±% |
|---|---|---|
| 1973 | 858,429 | — |
| 1983 | 1,055,359 | +22.9% |
| 2014 | 1,574,079 | +49.2% |
Source: 2014 Myanmar Census

Since the 1973 Census, the population of Kayin State has increased from 858,429 to 1,055,359 in the 1983 census and 1,574,079 in the census of 2014. This means the population of Kayin State has increased by about 49 percent between the 1983 and the 2014 census. The population of Kayin State ranks eleventh in size when compared with other States and Regions in the country, only higher than Tanintharyi Region, Nay Pyi Taw Union Territory and Chin State. In terms of the proportion of the total population, the population of Kayin State has marginally increased from 3.0 percent in 1983 to 3.1 percent in 2014.

=== Ethnic makeup ===
Ethnic composition of Kayin State
| Ethnic group | Percentage |
| Karen | 62.8% |
| Bamar | 13.6% |
| Mon | 11.2% |
| Pa-O | 4.8% |
| Other | 4.7% |
| Shan | 2.9% |
| Karenni | 0.01% |
Source: 2019 GAD township reports

The Karen make up the majority of Kayin State's population.

After the 2014 Census in Myanmar, the Burmese government indefinitely withheld release of detailed ethnicity data, citing concerns around political and social concerns surrounding the issue of ethnicity in Myanmar. In 2022, researchers published an analysis of the General Administration Department's nationwide 2018-2019 township reports to tabulate the ethnic makeup of Kayin State.

=== Religion ===
Religion in Kayin (2015)
1. Buddhism (84.5%)
2. Christianity (9.50%)
3. Islam (4.60%)
4. Other religion (0.70%)
5. Hinduism (0.60%)
6. Tribal religion (0.10%)

According to the 2014 Myanmar Census, Buddhists, who make up 84.5% of Kayin State's population, form the largest religious community there. Minority religious communities include Christians (9.5%), Muslims (4.6%), Hindus (0.6%), and animists (0.1%) who collectively comprise the remainder of Kayin State's population. 0.7% of the population listed no religion, other religions, or were otherwise not enumerated.

According to the State Sangha Maha Nayaka Committee's 2016 statistics, 14,080 Buddhist monks were registered in Kayin State, comprising 2.6% of Myanmar's total Sangha membership, which includes both novice samanera and fully-ordained bhikkhu. The majority of monks belong to the Thudhamma Nikaya (89%), followed by Shwegyin Nikaya (9.7%), with the remainder of monks belonging to other small monastic orders. 1,000 thilashin were registered in Kayin State, comprising 1.7% of Myanmar's total thilashin community.

== Economy ==
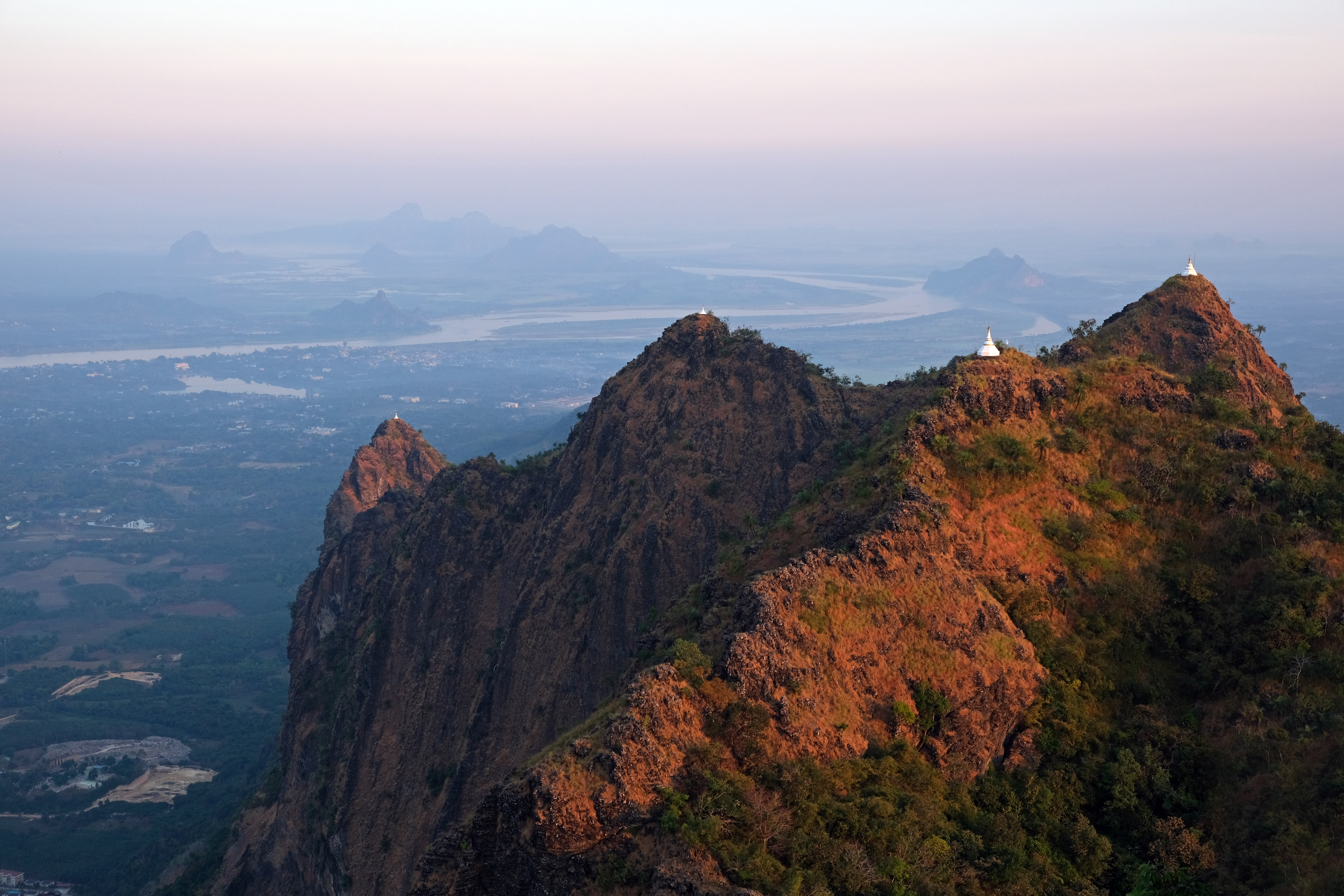
View from Mount Zwegabin towards Hpa-An.

=== Tourism ===
Tourism is one of the main economy of Kayin State. After the signing of the preliminary ceasefire between the KNU and the Myanmar government in 2012, the number of visitors to Kayin State increased significantly. Kayin State received over 40,000 tourists in 2013, while in 2016, the number of tourists reached a record 150,000.

=== Border trade ===
Myawaddy border trading post of Kayin State is the second biggest among Myanmar's 15 border trading posts. It is the main border crossing trade route between Thailand and Myanmar. According to Thailand's Chamber of Commerce, the monthly trade between the two countries in 2015 through the Mae Sot to Myawaddy crossing was worth over 3 billion baht (about 90 million US dollars).

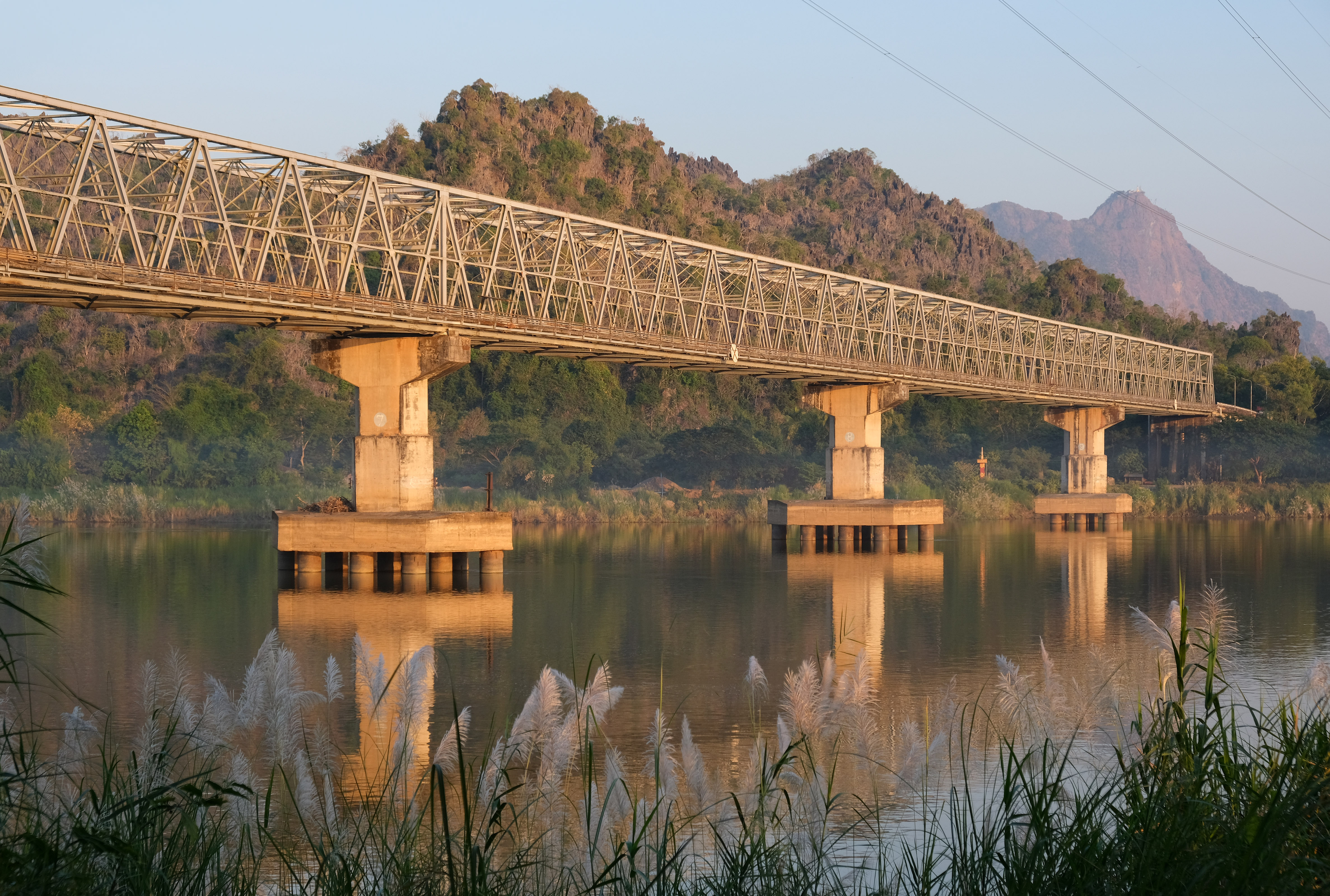
Thanlwin Bridge over the river Salween.

=== Agriculture ===
Kayin State is a farming state. As of 2017, there are over 460,000 acres of paddy fields and 260,000 acres of rubber tree plantations in Kayin State. There are over 9000 acres of coffee planted in Thandaung area. The Kayin State government is trying to implement new farming technology to improve its agriculture sector.

=== Industry ===
In 2016, the government announced a strategy to attract domestic and foreign investors to the Hpa-An industrial zone. However, the shortage of electricity supply hinders the development of Hpa-An industrial zone. The Kayin State government, in conjunction with a Japanese company, has been trying to carry out a feasibility survey for a 1800-megawatt coal-fired power plant to fulfil the need for electricity supply. On the other hand, community members and local environmental groups have raised concerns about the potential impacts of coal plant emissions.

== Transport ==
Kayin State is served by Hpapun Airport and Hpa-An Airport however they are closed to civilian aircraft.

In 2015, the Asian Development Bank (ADB) approved a $100 million loan to improve a 66.4 km section of road connecting the towns of Eindu and Kawkareik in Kayin state, the missing link of the Greater Mekong Subregion (GMS) East-West Corridor.

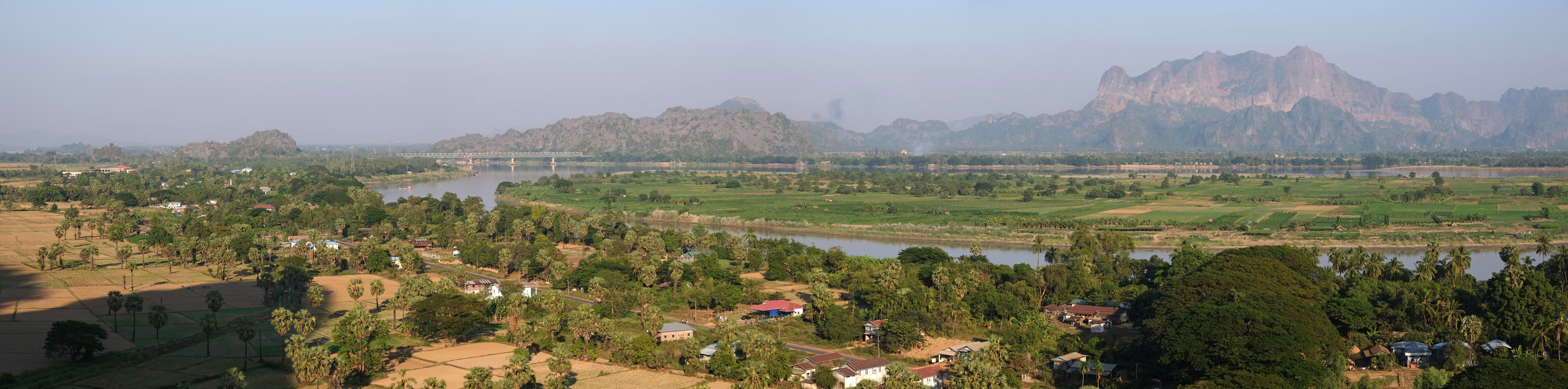
Salween River in Hpa-An. The mountain on the background is Mount Zwegabin.

== Education ==
Major universities in Kayin state include Hpa-An University, Computer University, Hpa-An and Technological University, Hpa-An, Hpa-an Education Degree College, Government Technical Institute, Hpa-an, Karen Medical College, Government Technical High School, Hpa-an, Nursing Training School, Hpa-an, State Agricultural Institute Zwekabin, Hpa-an, Basic Education And Technical, Agricultural and Livestock High School, Don Yin, Hpa-an and Technical Training School Hpa-an.

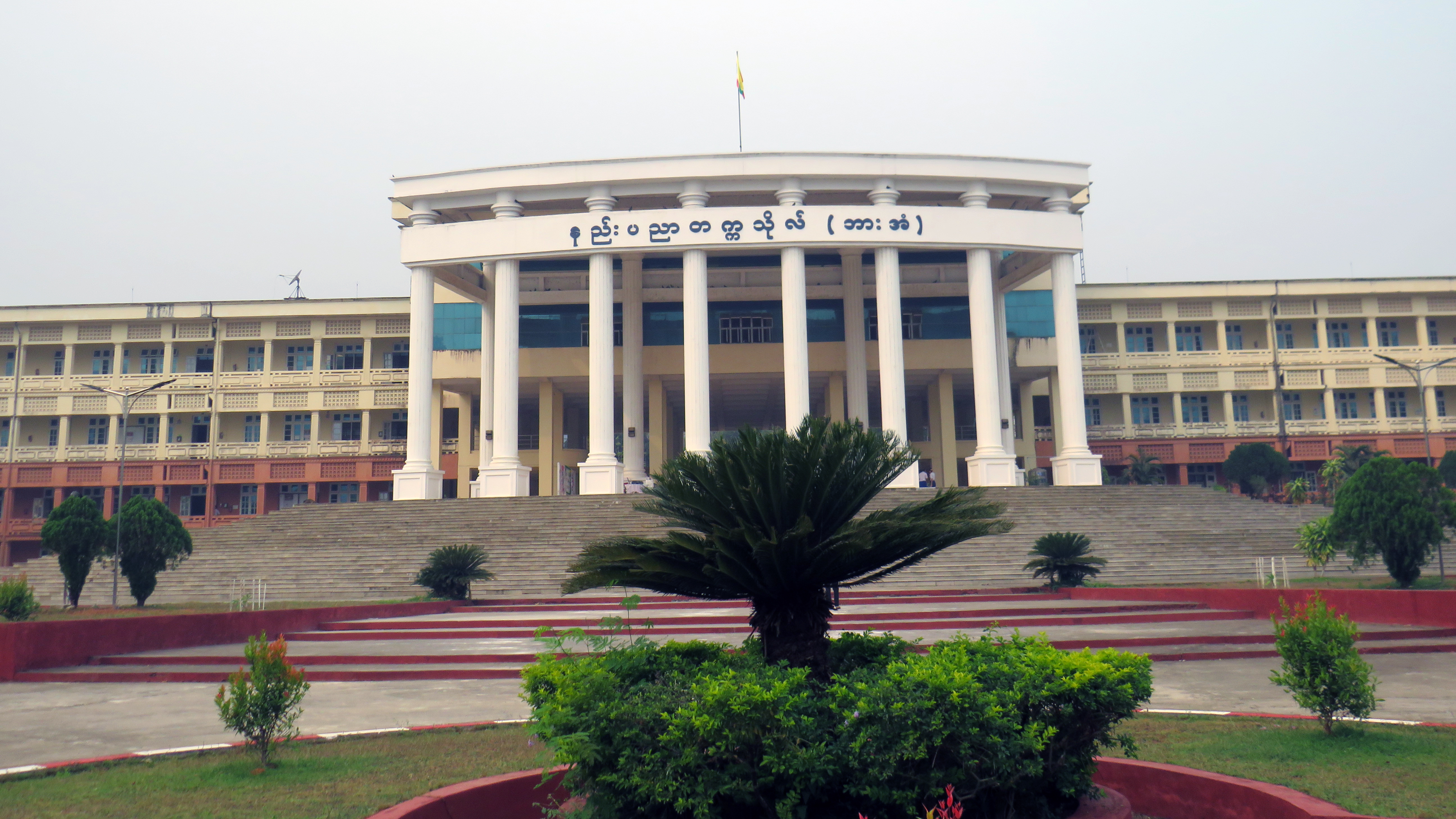
Technological University in Hpa-an

Educational opportunities in Myanmar are limited outside the main cities of Yangon and Mandalay. It is especially a problem in Kayin State where constant fighting between the government and insurgents for over 60 years has produced thousands of refugees and internally displaced people. According to official statistics, less than 10% of primary school students in Kayin State reach high school. All higher education institutions are located in Hpa-An City.

| AY 2002-2003 | Primary | Middle | High |
|---|---|---|---|
| Schools | 1139 | 78 | 31 |
| Teachers | 3400 | 1200 | 400 |
| Students | 148,000 | 47,000 | 12,000 |

== Health care ==
The general state of health care in Myanmar is poor. Although health care is nominally free, in reality, patients have to pay for medicine and treatment, even in public clinics and hospitals. Public hospitals lack some basic facilities and equipment.

In general, the health care infrastructure outside of Yangon and Mandalay is poor but is especially worse in conflict ridden areas like Kayin State. The public health care system in the state is very poor. The following is a summary of the public health care system in the state.

| 2002–2003 | # Hospitals | # Beds |
|---|---|---|
| Specialist hospitals | 0 | 0 |
| General hospitals with specialist services | 1 | 200 |
| General hospitals | 7 | 275 |
| Health clinics | 17 | 272 |
| Total | 25 | 747 |

== See also ==
- Democratic Karen Buddhist Army
- Karen conflict
- Karen Human Rights Group
- Karen National Liberation Army
- Karen National Union
- Kawthoolei
