= Haungtharaw River =

River in Myanmar

Coordinates: 16°36′12″N 98°00′25″E

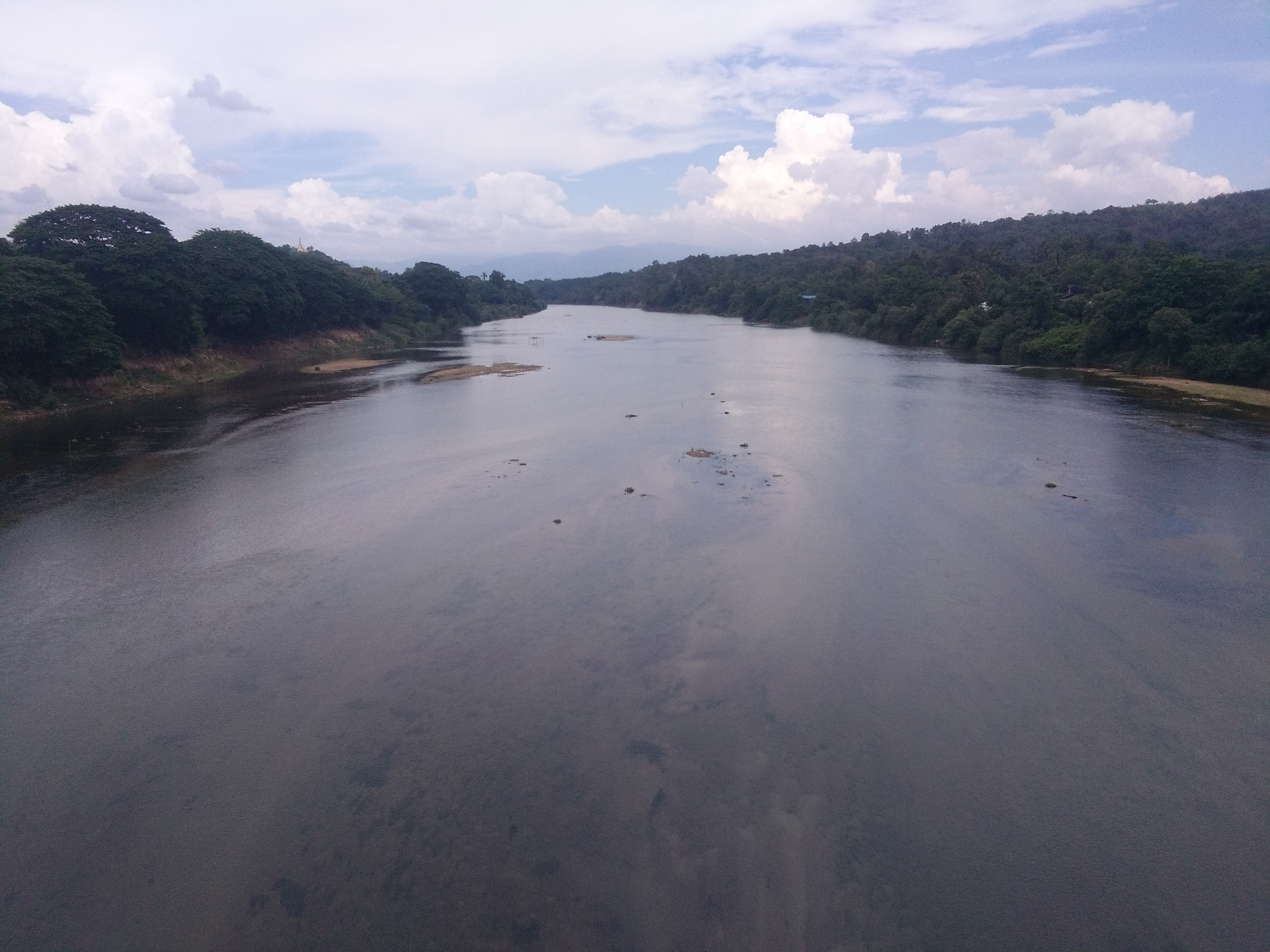
Haungtharaw (Haungthayaw River, view from Kya-in bridge

The Haungtharaw River, also known as the Haungthayaw River, is a river of Kayin State, in southeastern Burma (Myanmar). It has its source in the Dawna Range and flows into the Gyaing River.

== See also ==
- List of rivers of Burma
