= Kawkareik District =

Coordinates: 16°01′N 98°16′E

Kawkareik District (Phlone တိုဒ်ပ်ုလာယာ/ ကေါဝ်တြာ်ခြိုင့်; S'gaw Karen: ဒူဖျၢ်ယၢ်ကီၢ်ရ့ၣ်; also called Dooplaya in Karen language) is a district of the Karen State in Myanmar (Burma). It consists of 4 towns; Kawkareik, the capital, Kyainseikgyi, Kyondoe, Payathonzu and Kyaikdon; and 552 villages. The population as of 2014 was 475,191.

location in Kayin State

== Townships ==
In 2022, the Ministry of Home Affairs split up Kawkareik District, leaving it one and the same as Kawkareik Township. Prior to 2022, the District also contained Kyain Seikgyi Township. The district contains the following townships:
