= Kyain Seikgyi District =

Kyar Inn Seik Gyi Township Kyar Inn Seik Gyi District ကြာအင်းဆိပ်ကြီးမြို့နယ် ကြာအင်းဆိပ်ကြီးခရိုင် Kyar Inn Seik Gyi Township, Three Pagodas Pass Township
- Township and District
- Location in Karen State (in red)
- Coordinates: 15°54′N 98°11′E
- Country: Myanmar
- State: Kayin State
- District: Kyain Seikkyi District
- Capital: Kyainseikgyi

Population (2014)
  - Total: 106,427
- Time zone: UTC+6:30 (MMT)

Kyainseikgyi Township (Phlone: လာ့တ်ုကဝ်သၞေဝ်ဖါဍောဟ်ဍုံကၞင့်; Burmese: ကြာအင်းဆိပ်ကြီးမြို့နယ်, pronounced [tɕàʔɪ́ɰ̃sʰeɪʔtɕí mjo̰nɛ̀]) is the only township of Kyain Seikkyi District (Burmese: ကြာအင်းဆိပ်ကြီးခရိုင်) in southern Kayin State of Myanmar. It is the fourth-biggest township in Kayin State. The two main sub-towns are Kyeikdon and Payathonsu. It is drained by the Zami, Winyaw and the Haungtharaw rivers.

The basic education high schools located within Kyain Seikgyi Township are BEHS Kyainnseikyi, B.E.H.S-Tagondaing, BEHS Kale, BEHS Hparpya, BEHS Anankwin, BEHS Kyaikdon, BEHS Azin, BEHS Kyakhatchaung, BEHS Thanpayar, BEHS Taungpauk and BEHS Payathonzu. The main hospitals are Kya Inn Seikyi township public hospital, Kale-Tagundaing Station Hospital, Kyaikdon Station hospital, Payathonzu Station Hospital.

== Subtownships ==
The township contains the following subtownships:

- Hpayarthonesu Sub-township
- Kyaik done Sub-township
