= List of airports by IATA code: A =

The DST column shows the months in which Daylight Saving Time, a.k.a. Summer Time, begins and ends. A blank DST box usually indicates that the location stays on Standard Time all year, although in some cases the location stays on Summer Time all year. If a location is currently on DST, add one hour to the time in the Time column.

IATA	ICAO	Airport name	Location served	Time	DST
-AA-
AAA	NTGA	Anaa Airport	Anaa, Tuamotus, French Polynesia	UTC−10:00	
AAB	YARY	Arrabury Airport	Arrabury, Queensland, Australia	UTC+10:00	
AAC	HEAR	El Arish International Airport	El Arish, Egypt	UTC+02:00	
AAD	HCAD	Adado Airport	Adado (Cadaado), Galguduud, Somalia	UTC+03:00	
AAE	DABB	Rabah Bitat Airport (Les Salines Airport)	Annaba, Algeria	UTC+01:00	
AAF	KAAF	Apalachicola Regional Airport	Apalachicola, Florida, United States	UTC−05:00	Mar-Nov
AAG	SSYA	Arapoti Airport	Arapoti, Paraná, Brazil	UTC−03:00	
AAH	EDKA	Merzbrück Airport	Aachen, North Rhine-Westphalia, Germany	UTC+01:00	Mar-Oct
AAI	SWRA	Arraias Airport	Arraias, Tocantins, Brazil	UTC−03:00	
AAJ	SMCA	Cayana Airstrip	Awaradam, Suriname	UTC−03:00	
AAK	NGUK	Aranuka Airport	Aranuka, Kiribati	UTC+12:00	
AAL	EKYT	Aalborg Airport	Aalborg, Denmark	UTC+01:00	Mar-Oct
AAM	FAMD	Mala Mala Airport	Mala Mala, South Africa	UTC+02:00	
AAN	OMAL	Al Ain International Airport	Al Ain, United Arab Emirates	UTC+04:00	
AAO	SVAN	Anaco Airport	Anaco, Venezuela	UTC−04:00	
AAP	WALS	Aji Pangeran Tumenggung Pranoto International Airport	Samarinda, East Kalimantan, Indonesia	UTC+08:00	
AAQ	URKA	Anapa Airport	Anapa, Krasnodar Krai, Russia	UTC+03:00	
AAR	EKAH	Aarhus Airport	Aarhus, Denmark	UTC+01:00	Mar-Oct
AAS		Apalapsili Airport	Apalapsili, Indonesia	UTC+09:00	
AAT	ZWAT	Altay Airport	Altay, Xinjiang, China	UTC+08:00	
AAU	NSAU	Asau Airport	Asau, Savai'i Island, Samoa	UTC+13:00	Sep-Apr
AAV	RPMA	Allah Valley Airport	Surallah, Philippines	UTC+08:00	
AAX	SBAX	Araxá Airport	Araxá, Minas Gerais, Brazil	UTC−03:00	
AAY	OYGD	Al Ghaydah Airport	Al Ghaydah, Yemen	UTC+03:00	
AAZ	MGQZ	Quetzaltenango Airport	Quetzaltenango, Guatemala	UTC−06:00	
-AB-
ABA	UNAA	Abakan International Airport	Abakan, Republic of Khakassia, Russia	UTC+07:00	
ABB	DNAS	Asaba International Airport	Asaba, Nigeria	UTC+01:00	
ABC	LEAB	Albacete Airport	Albacete, Castilla-La Mancha, Spain	UTC+01:00	Mar-Oct
ABD	OIAA	Abadan International Airport	Abadan, Iran	UTC+03:30	Mar-Sep
ABE	KABE	Lehigh Valley International Airport	Allentown, Pennsylvania, United States	UTC−05:00	Mar-Nov
ABF	NGAB	Abaiang Atoll Airport	Abaiang, Kiribati	UTC+12:00	
ABG	YABI	Abingdon Airport	Abingdon Downs, Queensland, Australia	UTC+10:00	
ABH	YAPH	Alpha Airport	Alpha, Queensland, Australia	UTC+10:00	
ABI	KABI	Abilene Regional Airport	Abilene, Texas, United States	UTC−06:00	Mar-Nov
ABJ	DIAP	Port Bouet Airport (Felix Houphouet Boigny Int'l)	Abidjan, Côte d'Ivoire	UTC+00:00	
ABK	HAKD	Kabri Dar Airport	Kebri Dahar, Ethiopia	UTC+03:00	
ABL	PAFM	Ambler Airport (FAA: AFM)	Ambler, Alaska, United States	UTC−09:00	Mar-Nov
ABM	YNPE	Northern Peninsula Airport	Bamaga, Queensland, Australia	UTC+10:00	
ABN	SMBN	Albina Airstrip	Albina, Suriname	UTC−03:00	
ABO	DIAO	Aboisso Airport	Aboisso, Côte d'Ivoire	UTC+00:00	
ABP		Atkamba Airport	Atkamba, Papua New Guinea	UTC+10:00	
ABQ	KABQ	Albuquerque International Sunport	Albuquerque, New Mexico, United States	UTC−07:00	Mar-Nov
ABR	KABR	Aberdeen Regional Airport	Aberdeen, South Dakota, United States	UTC−06:00	Mar-Nov
ABS	HEBL	Abu Simbel Airport	Abu Simbel, Egypt	UTC+02:00	
ABT	OEBA	Al-Baha Domestic Airport	Al Bahah, Saudi Arabia	UTC+03:00	
ABU	WATA	Haliwen Airport	Atambua, Indonesia	UTC+08:00	
ABV	DNAA	Nnamdi Azikiwe International Airport	Abuja, Nigeria	UTC+01:00	
ABW		Abau Airport	Abau, Papua New Guinea	UTC+10:00	
ABX	YMAY	Albury Airport	Albury, New South Wales, Australia	UTC+10:00	Oct-Apr
ABY	KABY	Southwest Georgia Regional Airport	Albany, Georgia, United States	UTC−05:00	Mar-Nov
ABZ	EGPD	Aberdeen Airport	Aberdeen, Scotland, United Kingdom	UTC+00:00	Mar-Oct
-AC-
ACA	MMAA	Acapulco International Airport	Acapulco, Guerrero, Mexico	UTC−06:00	Apr-Oct
ACB	KACB	Antrim County Airport	Bellaire, Michigan, United States	UTC−05:00	Mar-Nov
ACC	DGAA	Accra International Airport	Accra, Ghana	UTC+00:00	
ACD	SKAD	Alcides Fernández Airport	Acandí, Colombia	UTC−05:00	
ACE	GCRR	Lanzarote Airport	Lanzarote, Canary Islands, Spain	UTC+00:00	Mar-Oct
ACF	ZWAL	Aral Talim Airport	Aral, Xinjiang, China	UTC+08:00	
ACH	LSZR	St. Gallen–Altenrhein Airport	Altenrhein, Switzerland	UTC+01:00	Mar-Oct
ACI	EGJA	Alderney Airport	Alderney, Channel Islands, United Kingdom	UTC+00:00	Mar-Oct
ACJ	VCCA	Anuradhapura Airport	Anuradhapura, Sri Lanka	UTC+05:30	
ACK	KACK	Nantucket Memorial Airport	Nantucket, Massachusetts, United States	UTC−05:00	Mar-Nov
ACL		Aguaclara Airport	Aguaclara, Colombia	UTC−05:00	
ACM		Arica Airport	Arica, Colombia	UTC−05:00	
ACN	MMCC	Ciudad Acuña International Airport	Ciudad Acuña, Coahuila, Mexico	UTC−06:00	Mar-Nov
ACO	MRAF	Cobano Airport	Cóbano, Costa Rica	UTC−06:00	
ACP	OITM	Sahand Airport	Maragheh, Iran	UTC+03:30	Mar-Sep
ACR	SKAC	Araracuara Airport	Araracuara, Colombia	UTC−05:00	
ACS	UNKS	Achinsk Airport	Achinsk, Krasnoyarsk Krai, Russia	UTC+07:00	
ACT	KACT	Waco Regional Airport	Waco, Texas, United States	UTC−06:00	Mar-Nov
ACU		Achutupo Airport	Achutupo, Panama	UTC−05:00	
ACV	KACV	Arcata-Eureka Airport	Eureka / Arcata, California, United States	UTC−08:00	Mar-Nov
ACX	ZUYI	Xingyi Wanfenglin Airport	Xingyi, Guizhou, China	UTC+08:00	
ACY	KACY	Atlantic City International Airport	Atlantic City, New Jersey, United States	UTC−05:00	Mar-Nov
ACZ	OIZB	Zabol Airport	Zabol, Iran	UTC+03:30	Mar-Sep
-AD-
ADA	LTAF	Adana Şakirpaşa Airport	Adana, Turkey	UTC+03:00	
ADB	LTBJ	Adnan Menderes Airport	İzmir, Turkey	UTC+03:00	
ADC	AYAN	Andakombe Airport	Andakombe, Papua New Guinea	UTC+10:00	
ADD	HAAB	Bole International Airport	Addis Ababa, Ethiopia	UTC+03:00	
ADE	OYAA	Aden International Airport	Aden, Yemen	UTC+03:00	
ADF	LTCP	Adıyaman Airport	Adıyaman, Turkey	UTC+03:00	
ADG	KADG	Lenawee County Airport	Adrian, Michigan, United States	UTC−05:00	Mar-Nov
ADH	UEEA	Aldan Airport	Aldan, Yakutia, Russia	UTC+09:00	
ADI	FYAR	Arandis Airport	Arandis, Namibia	UTC+01:00	Sep-Apr
ADJ	OJAM	Amman Civil Airport (Marka International Airport)	Amman, Jordan	UTC+02:00	Mar-Oct
ADK	PADK	Adak Airport	Adak Island, Alaska, United States	UTC−10:00	Mar-Nov
ADL	YPAD	Adelaide Airport	Adelaide, South Australia, Australia	UTC+09:30	Oct-Apr
ADM	KADM	Ardmore Municipal Airport	Ardmore, Oklahoma, United States	UTC−06:00	Mar-Nov
ADN	SKAN	Andes Airport	Andes, Colombia	UTC−05:00	
ADO	YAMK	Andamooka Airport	Andamooka, South Australia, Australia	UTC+09:30	Oct-Apr
ADP	VCCG	Ampara Airport	Ampara, Sri Lanka	UTC+05:30	
ADQ	PADQ	Kodiak Airport	Kodiak, Alaska, United States	UTC−09:00	Mar-Nov
ADR	KPHH	Robert F. Swinnie Airport (FAA: PHH)	Andrews, South Carolina, United States	UTC−05:00	Mar-Nov
ADS	KADS	Addison Airport	Dallas, Texas, United States	UTC−06:00	Mar-Nov
ADT	KADH	Ada Municipal Airport (FAA: ADH)	Ada, Oklahoma, United States	UTC−06:00	Mar-Nov
ADU	OITL	Ardabil Airport	Ardabil, Iran	UTC+03:30	Mar-Sep
ADV		Ed Daein Airport	Ed Daein, Sudan	UTC+03:00	
ADW	KADW	Andrews Field (Andrews Air Force Base)	Camp Springs, Maryland, United States	UTC−05:00	Mar-Nov
ADX	EGQL	Leuchars Station (formerly RAF Leuchars)	St Andrews, Scotland, United Kingdom	UTC+00:00	Mar-Oct
ADY	FAAL	Alldays Airport	Alldays, South Africa	UTC+02:00	
ADZ	SKSP	Gustavo Rojas Pinilla International Airport	San Andres Island, Colombia	UTC−05:00	
-AE-
AEA	NGTB	Abemama Atoll Airport	Abemama Atoll, Kiribati	UTC+12:00	
AEB	ZGBS	Baise Bama Airport	Baise, Guangxi, China	UTC+08:00	
AEE		Adareil Airport	Adareil, South Sudan	UTC+03:00	
AEG	WIME	Aek Godang Airport	Padang Sidempuan, Indonesia	UTC+07:00	
AEH	FTTC	Abéché Airport	Abéché, Chad	UTC+01:00	
AEK	AYAX	Aseki Airport	Aseki, Papua New Guinea	UTC+10:00	
AEL	KAEL	Albert Lea Municipal Airport	Albert Lea, Minnesota, United States	UTC−06:00	Mar-Nov
AEM	UHTG	Amgu Airport	Amgu, Primorsky Krai, Russia	UTC+10:00	
AEO	GQNA	Aioun el Atrouss Airport	Aioun el Atrouss, Mauritania	UTC+00:00	
AEP	SABE	Jorge Newbery Airpark	Buenos Aires, Argentina	UTC−03:00	
AEQ		Ar Horqin Airport	Ar Horqin Banner, China	UTC+08:00	
AER	URSS	Sochi International Airport	Sochi, Krasnodar Krai, Russia	UTC+03:00	
AES	ENAL	Ålesund Airport, Vigra	Ålesund, Norway	UTC+01:00	Mar-Oct
AET	PFAL	Allakaket Airport (FAA: 6A8)	Allakaket, Alaska, United States	UTC−09:00	Mar-Nov
AEU	OIBA	Abu Musa Airport	Abu Musa Island, Iran	UTC+03:30	Mar-Sep
AEX	KAEX	Alexandria International Airport	Alexandria, Louisiana, United States	UTC−06:00	Mar-Nov
AEY	BIAR	Akureyri Airport	Akureyri, Iceland	UTC+00:00	
-AF-
AFA	SAMR	San Rafael Airport	San Rafael, Mendoza, Argentina	UTC−03:00	
AFD	FAPA	Port Alfred Airport	Port Alfred, South Africa	UTC+02:00	
AFF	KAFF	United States Air Force Academy Airfield	Colorado Springs, Colorado, United States	UTC−07:00	Mar-Nov
AFI	SKAM	Amalfi Airport	Amalfi, Colombia	UTC−05:00	
AFK		Kondavattavan Tank Seaplane Base	Ampara, Sri Lanka	UTC+05:30	
AFL	SBAT	Alta Floresta Airport	Alta Floresta, Mato Grosso, Brazil	UTC−04:00	
AFN	KAFN	Jaffrey Airport–Silver Ranch	Jaffrey, New Hampshire, United States	UTC−05:00	Mar-Nov
AFO	KAFO	Afton Municipal Airport	Afton, Wyoming, United States	UTC−07:00	Mar-Nov
AFR	AYAF	Afore Airstrip	Afore, Papua New Guinea	UTC+10:00	
AFS	UTSN	Zarafshan Airport	Zarafshan, Uzbekistan	UTC+05:00	
AFT	AGAF	Afutara Airport	Afutara, Malaita, Solomon Islands	UTC+11:00	
AFW	KAFW	Fort Worth Alliance Airport	Fort Worth, Texas, United States	UTC−06:00	Mar-Nov
AFY	LTAH	Afyon Airport	Afyon, Turkey	UTC+03:00	
AFZ	OIMS	Sabzevar Airport	Sabzevar, Iran	UTC+03:30	Mar-Sep
-AG-
AGA	GMAD	Agadir–Al Massira Airport	Agadir, Morocco	UTC+00:00	Mar-Oct^{1}
AGB	EDMA	Augsburg Airport	Augsburg, Bavaria, Germany	UTC+01:00	Mar-Oct
AGC	KAGC	Allegheny County Airport	Pittsburgh, Pennsylvania, United States	UTC−05:00	Mar-Nov
AGD	WASG	Anggi Airport	Anggi, Indonesia	UTC+09:00	
AGE	EDWG	Wangerooge Airfield	Wangerooge, Lower Saxony, Germany	UTC+01:00	Mar-Oct
AGF	LFBA	Agen La Garenne Airport	Agen, Aquitaine, France	UTC+01:00	Mar-Oct
AGG		Angoram Airport	Angoram, Papua New Guinea	UTC+10:00	
AGH	ESTA	Ängelholm–Helsingborg Airport (former ICAO: ESDB)	Ängelholm, Sweden	UTC+01:00	Mar-Oct
AGI	SMWA	Wageningen Airstrip	Wageningen, Suriname	UTC−03:00	
AGJ	RORA	Aguni Airport	Aguni, Okinawa, Japan	UTC+09:00	
AGK		Kagua Airport	Kagua, Papua New Guinea	UTC+10:00	
AGL	AYWG	Wanigela Airport	Wanigela, Papua New Guinea	UTC+10:00	
AGN	PAGN	Angoon Seaplane Base	Angoon, Alaska, United States	UTC−09:00	Mar-Nov
AGO	KAGO	Magnolia Municipal Airport	Magnolia, Arkansas, United States	UTC−06:00	Mar-Nov
AGP	LEMG	Málaga Airport	Málaga, Andalusia, Spain	UTC+01:00	Mar-Oct
AGQ	LGAG	Agrinion Airport	Agrinion, Greece	UTC+02:00	Mar-Oct
AGR	VIAG	Agra Airport	Agra, Uttar Pradesh, India	UTC+05:30	
AGS	KAGS	Augusta Regional Airport at Bush Field	Augusta, Georgia, United States	UTC−05:00	Mar-Nov
AGT	SGES	Guaraní International Airport	Ciudad del Este, Paraguay	UTC−04:00	Oct-Mar
AGU	MMAS	Lic. Jesús Terán Peredo International Airport	Aguascalientes, Aguascalientes, Mexico	UTC−06:00	Apr-Oct
AGV	SVAC	Oswaldo Guevara Mujica Airport	Acarigua, Venezuela	UTC−04:00	
AGW		Agnew Airport	Agnew, Queensland, Australia	UTC+10:00	
AGX	VOAT	Agatti Aerodrome	Agatti Island, Lakshadweep, India	UTC+05:30	
AGZ	FAAG	Aggeneys Airport	Aggeneys, South Africa	UTC+02:00	
-AH-
AHB	OEAB	Abha Regional Airport	Abha, Saudi Arabia	UTC+03:00	
AHC	KAHC	Amedee Army Airfield	Herlong, California, United States	UTC−08:00	Mar-Nov
AHD		Ardmore Downtown Executive Airport (FAA: 1F0)	Ardmore, Oklahoma, United States	UTC−06:00	Mar-Nov
AHE	NTHE	Ahe Airport	Ahe, Tuamotus, French Polynesia	UTC−10:00	
AHF		Arapahoe Municipal Airport (FAA: 37V)	Arapahoe, Nebraska, United States	UTC−06:00	Mar-Nov
AHH	KAHH	Amery Municipal Airport	Amery, Wisconsin, United States	UTC−06:00	Mar-Nov
AHI	WAPA	Amahai Airport	Amahai, Indonesia	UTC+09:00	
AHJ	ZUHY	Hongyuan Airport	Hongyuan, Sichuan, China	UTC+08:00	
AHL	SYAH	Aishalton Airport	Aishalton, Guyana	UTC−04:00	
AHM		Ashland Municipal Airport (FAA: S03)	Ashland, Oregon, United States	UTC−08:00	Mar-Nov
AHN	KAHN	Athens Ben Epps Airport	Athens, Georgia, United States	UTC−05:00	Mar-Nov
AHO	LIEA	Alghero-Fertilia Airport	Alghero, Sardinia, Italy	UTC+01:00	Mar-Oct
AHS	MHAH	Ahuas Airport	Ahuas, Honduras	UTC−06:00	
AHU	GMTA	Cherif Al Idrissi Airport	Al Hoceima, Morocco	UTC+00:00	Mar-Oct^{1}
AHW		Saih Rawl Airport	Saih Rawl, Oman	UTC+04:00	
AHY		Ambatolahy Airport	Ambatolahy, Madagascar	UTC+03:00	
AHZ	LFHU	Alpe d'Huez Airport	Alpe d'Huez, Rhône-Alpes, France	UTC+01:00	Mar-Oct
-AI-
AIA	KAIA	Alliance Municipal Airport	Alliance, Nebraska, United States	UTC−07:00	Mar-Nov
AIC		Ailinglaplap Airok Airport	Airok, Ailinglaplap Atoll, Marshall Islands	UTC+12:00	
AID	KAID	Anderson Municipal Airport (Darlington Field)	Anderson, Indiana, United States	UTC−05:00	Mar-Nov
AIE	AYAO	Aiome Airport	Aiome, Papua New Guinea	UTC+10:00	
AIF	SNAX	Assis Airport (former ICAO: SBAS)	Assis, São Paulo, Brazil	UTC−03:00	
AIG	FEFY	Yalinga Airport	Yalinga, Central African Republic	UTC+01:00	
AIH	AYAK	Aiambak Airport	Aiambak, Papua New Guinea	UTC+10:00	
AII	HDAS	Ali-Sabieh Airport	Ali Sabieh, Djibouti	UTC+03:00	
AIK	KAIK	Aiken Municipal Airport	Aiken, South Carolina, United States	UTC−05:00	Mar-Nov
AIL		Ailigandí Airport	Ailigandí, Panama	UTC−05:00	
AIM		Ailuk Airport	Ailuk Atoll, Marshall Islands	UTC+12:00	
AIN	PAWI	Wainwright Airport (FAA: AWI)	Wainwright, Alaska, United States	UTC−09:00	Mar-Nov
AIO	KAIO	Atlantic Municipal Airport	Atlantic, Iowa, United States	UTC−06:00	Mar-Nov
AIP	VIAX	Adampur Airport	Jalandhar, Punjab, India	UTC+05:30	
AIR	SSOU	Aripuanã Airport	Aripuanã, Mato Grosso, Brazil	UTC−04:00	
AIS	NGTR	Arorae Island Airport	Arorae Island, Kiribati	UTC+12:00	
AIT	NCAI	Aitutaki Airport	Aitutaki, Cook Islands	UTC−10:00	
AIU	NCAT	Enua Airport	Atiu Island, Cook Islands	UTC−10:00	
AIV	KAIV	George Downer Airport	Aliceville, Alabama, United States	UTC−06:00	Mar-Nov
AIW		Ai-Ais Airport	Ai-Ais, Namibia	UTC+02:00	Sep-Apr
AIY	SNUI	Araçuai Airport	Araçuai, Minas Gerais, Brazil	UTC−03:00	
AIZ	KAIZ	Lee C. Fine Memorial Airport	Lake Ozark, Missouri, United States	UTC−06:00	Mar-Nov
-AJ-
AJA	LFKJ	Ajaccio Napoleon Bonaparte Airport	Ajaccio, Corsica, France	UTC+01:00	Mar-Oct
AJF	OESK	Al-Jawf Domestic Airport	Sakakah, Al Jawf, Saudi Arabia	UTC+03:00	
AJI	LTCO	Ağrı Airport	Ağrı, Turkey	UTC+03:00	
AJJ	GQNJ	Akjoujt Airport	Akjoujt, Mauritania	UTC+00:00	
AJK	OIHR	Arak Airport	Arak, Iran	UTC+03:30	Mar-Sep
AJL	VELP	Lengpui Airport	Aizawl, Mizoram, India	UTC+05:30	
AJN	FMCV	Ouani Airport	Anjouan, Comoros	UTC+03:00	
AJR	ESNX	Arvidsjaur Airport	Arvidsjaur, Sweden	UTC+01:00	Mar-Oct
AJS	MX86	Punta Abreojos Airstrip	Punta Abreojos, Baja California Sur, Mexico	UTC−07:00	Apr-Oct
AJU	SBAR	Santa Maria Airport	Aracaju, Sergipe, Brazil	UTC−03:00	
AJY	DRZA	Mano Dayak International Airport	Agadez, Niger	UTC+01:00	
-AK-
AKA	ZLAK	Ankang Wulipu Airport	Ankang, Shaanxi, China	UTC+08:00	
AKB	PAAK	Atka Airport (FAA: AKA)	Atka, Alaska, United States	UTC−10:00	Mar-Nov
AKC	KAKR	Akron Fulton International Airport (FAA: AKR)	Akron, Ohio, United States	UTC−05:00	Mar-Nov
AKD	VAAK	Akola Airport	Akola, Maharashtra, India	UTC+05:30	
AKE	FOGA	Akieni Airport	Akiéni, Gabon	UTC+01:00	
AKF	HLKF	Kufra Airport	Kufra, Libya	UTC+02:00	
AKG	AYGU	Anguganak Airport	Anguganak, Papua New Guinea	UTC+10:00	
AKH	OEPS	Prince Sultan Air Base	Al-Kharj, Saudi Arabia	UTC+03:00	
AKI	PFAK	Akiak Airport	Akiak, Alaska, United States	UTC−09:00	Mar-Nov
AKJ	RJEC	Asahikawa Airport	Asahikawa, Hokkaido, Japan	UTC+09:00	
AKK	PAKH	Akhiok Airport	Akhiok, Alaska, United States	UTC−09:00	Mar-Nov
AKL	NZAA	Auckland Airport	Auckland, New Zealand	UTC+12:00	Sep-Apr
AKM		Zakouma Airport	Zakouma National Park, Chad	UTC+01:00	
AKN	PAKN	King Salmon Airport	King Salmon, Alaska, United States	UTC−09:00	Mar-Nov
AKO	KAKO	Colorado Plains Regional Airport	Akron, Colorado, United States	UTC−07:00	Mar-Nov
AKP	PAKP	Anaktuvuk Pass Airport	Anaktuvuk Pass, Alaska, United States	UTC−09:00	Mar-Nov
AKQ	WIAG	Gunung Batin Airport	Astraksetra, Indonesia	UTC+07:00	
AKR	DNAK	Akure Airport	Akure, Nigeria	UTC+01:00	
AKS	AGGA	Auki Gwaunaru'u Airport	Auki, Malaita, Solomon Islands	UTC+11:00	
AKT	LCRA	RAF Akrotiri	Akrotiri, United Kingdom	UTC+02:00	Mar-Oct
AKU	ZWAK	Aksu Airport	Aksu, Xinjiang, China	UTC+08:00	
AKV	CYKO	Akulivik Airport	Akulivik, Quebec, Canada	UTC−05:00	Mar-Nov
AKW	OIAG	Aghajari Airport	Aghajari, Iran	UTC+03:30	Mar-Sep
AKX	UATT	Aktobe Airport	Aktobe, Kazakhstan	UTC+05:00	
AKY	VYSW	Sittwe Airport	Sittwe, Myanmar	UTC+06:30	
-AL-
ALA	UAAA	Almaty International Airport	Almaty, Kazakhstan	UTC+06:00	
ALB	KALB	Albany International Airport	Albany, New York, United States	UTC−05:00	Mar-Nov
ALC	LEAL	Alicante–Elche Airport	Alicante, Valencia, Spain	UTC+01:00	Mar-Oct
ALD	SPAR	Alerta Airport	Alerta, Peru	UTC−05:00	
ALE		Alpine–Casparis Municipal Airport (FAA: E38)	Alpine, Texas, United States	UTC−06:00	Mar-Nov
ALF	ENAT	Alta Airport	Alta, Norway	UTC+01:00	Mar-Oct
ALG	DAAG	Houari Boumediene Airport	Algiers, Algeria	UTC+01:00	
ALH	YABA	Albany Airport	Albany, Western Australia, Australia	UTC+08:00	
ALI	KALI	Alice International Airport	Alice, Texas, United States	UTC−06:00	Mar-Nov
ALJ	FAAB	Alexander Bay Airport	Alexander Bay, South Africa	UTC+02:00	
ALK		Asella Airport	Asella, Ethiopia	UTC+03:00	
ALL	LIMG	Albenga Airport	Albenga, Liguria, Italy	UTC+01:00	Mar-Oct
ALM	KALM	Alamogordo–White Sands Regional Airport	Alamogordo, New Mexico, United States	UTC−07:00	Mar-Nov
ALN	KALN	St. Louis Regional Airport	Alton, Illinois, United States	UTC−06:00	Mar-Nov
ALO	KALO	Waterloo Regional Airport	Waterloo, Iowa, United States	UTC−06:00	Mar-Nov
ALP	OSAP	Aleppo International Airport	Aleppo, Syria	UTC+02:00	Mar-Oct
ALQ	SSLT	Alegrete Airport	Alegrete, Rio Grande do Sul, Brazil	UTC−03:00	
ALR	NZLX	Alexandra Aerodrome	Alexandra, New Zealand	UTC+12:00	Sep-Apr
ALS	KALS	San Luis Valley Regional Airport	Alamosa, Colorado, United States	UTC−07:00	Mar-Nov
ALT		Alenquer Airport	Alenquer, Pará, Brazil	UTC−03:00	
ALU	HCMA	Alula Airport	Alula, Somalia	UTC+03:00	
ALW	KALW	Walla Walla Regional Airport	Walla Walla, Washington, United States	UTC−08:00	Mar-Nov
ALX	KALX	Thomas C. Russell Field	Alexander City, Alabama, United States	UTC−06:00	Mar-Nov
ALY	HEAX	El Nouzha Airport	Alexandria, Egypt	UTC+02:00	
ALZ		Alitak Seaplane Base	Lazy Bay, Alaska, United States	UTC−09:00	Mar-Nov
-AM-
AMA	KAMA	Rick Husband Amarillo International Airport	Amarillo, Texas, United States	UTC−06:00	Mar-Nov
AMB	FMNE	Ambilobe Airport	Ambilobe, Madagascar	UTC+03:00	
AMC	FTTN	Am Timan Airport	Am Timan, Chad	UTC+01:00	
AMD	VAAH	Sardar Vallabhbhai Patel International Airport	Ahmedabad, Gujarat, India	UTC+05:30	
AME		Alto Molocue Airport	Alto Molocue, Mozambique	UTC+02:00	
AMF	AYAA	Ama Airport	Ama, Papua New Guinea	UTC+10:00	
AMG		Amboin Airport	Amboin, Papua New Guinea	UTC+10:00	
AMH	HAAM	Arba Minch Airport	Arba Minch, Ethiopia	UTC+03:00	
AMI	VIAM	Ambala Airport	Ambala, Haryana, India	UTC+05:30	
AMJ	SNAR	Almenara Airport	Almenara, Minas Gerais, Brazil	UTC−03:00	
AMK		Animas Air Park (FAA: 00C)	Durango, Colorado, United States	UTC−07:00	Mar-Nov
AML		Puerto Armuelles Airport	Puerto Armuelles, Panama	UTC−05:00	
AMM	OJAI	Queen Alia International Airport	Amman, Jordan	UTC+02:00	Mar-Oct
AMN	KAMN	Gratiot Community Airport	Alma, Michigan, United States	UTC−05:00	Mar-Nov
AMO	FTTU	Mao Airport	Mao, Chad	UTC+01:00	
AMP	FMSY	Ampanihy Airport	Ampanihy, Madagascar	UTC+03:00	
AMQ	WAPP	Pattimura Airport	Ambon, Indonesia	UTC+09:00	
AMS	EHAM	Amsterdam Airport Schiphol	Amsterdam, Netherlands	UTC+01:00	Mar-Oct
AMT	YAMT	Amata Airport	Amata, South Australia, Australia	UTC+09:30	
AMU	AYAM	Amanab Airport	Amanab, Papua New Guinea	UTC+10:00	
AMV	ULDD	Amderma Airport	Amderma, Nenets Autonomous Okrug, Russia	UTC+03:00	
AMW	KAMW	Ames Municipal Airport	Ames, Iowa, United States	UTC−06:00	Mar-Nov
AMX		Ammaroo Airport	Ammaroo, Northern Territory, Australia	UTC+09:30	
AMY		Ambatomainty Airport	Ambatomainty, Madagascar	UTC+03:00	
AMZ	NZAR	Ardmore Airport	Ardmore, New Zealand	UTC+12:00	Sep-Apr
-AN-
ANA		Angama Mara Airport	Angama Mara, Narok County, Kenya	UTC+03:00	
ANB	KANB	Anniston Regional Airport	Anniston, Alabama, United States	UTC−06:00	Mar-Nov
ANC	PANC	Ted Stevens Anchorage International Airport	Anchorage, Alaska, United States	UTC−09:00	Mar-Nov
AND	KAND	Anderson Regional Airport	Anderson, South Carolina, United States	UTC−05:00	Mar-Nov
ANE	LFJR	Angers – Loire Airport	Angers, Pays de la Loire, France	UTC+01:00	Mar-Oct
ANF	SCFA	Cerro Moreno International Airport	Antofagasta, Chile	UTC−04:00	Aug-May
ANG	LFBU	Angoulême – Cognac International Airport	Angoulême, Poitou-Charentes, France	UTC+01:00	Mar-Oct
ANI	PANI	Aniak Airport	Aniak, Alaska, United States	UTC−09:00	Mar-Nov
ANJ	FCBZ	Zanaga Airport	Zanaga, Republic of the Congo	UTC+01:00	
ANK	LTAD	Etimesgut Air Base	Ankara, Turkey	UTC+03:00	
ANL		Andulo Airport	Andulo, Angola	UTC+01:00	
ANM	FMNH	Antsirabato Airport	Antalaha, Madagascar	UTC+03:00	
ANN	PANT	Annette Island Airport	Annette Island, Alaska, United States	UTC−08:00	
ANO	FQAG	Angoche Airport	Angoche, Mozambique	UTC+02:00	
ANP	KANP	Lee Airport	Annapolis, Maryland, United States	UTC−05:00	Mar-Nov
ANQ	KANQ	Tri-State Steuben County Airport	Angola, Indiana, United States	UTC−05:00	Mar-Nov
ANR	EBAW	Antwerp International Airport	Antwerp, Belgium	UTC+01:00	Mar-Oct
ANS	SPHY	Andahuaylas Airport	Andahuaylas, Peru	UTC−05:00	
ANU	TAPA	V. C. Bird International Airport	Antigua, Antigua and Barbuda	UTC−04:00	
ANV	PANV	Anvik Airport	Anvik, Alaska, United States	UTC−09:00	Mar-Nov
ANW	KANW	Ainsworth Regional Airport	Ainsworth, Nebraska, United States	UTC−06:00	Mar-Nov
ANX	ENAN	Andøya Airport, Andenes	Andenes, Norway	UTC+01:00	Mar-Oct
ANY	KANY	Anthony Municipal Airport	Anthony, Kansas, United States	UTC−06:00	Mar-Nov
ANZ		Angus Downs Airport	Angus Downs, Northern Territory, Australia	UTC+09:30	
-AO-
AOA		Aroa Airport	Aroa, Papua New Guinea	UTC+10:00	
AOB		Annanberg Airport	Annanberg, Papua New Guinea	UTC+10:00	
AOC	EDAC	Leipzig–Altenburg Airport	Altenburg, Thuringia, Germany	UTC+01:00	Mar-Oct
AOD		Abou-Deïa Airport	Abou-Deïa, Chad	UTC+01:00	
AOE	LTBY	Anadolu Airport	Eskişehir, Turkey	UTC+03:00	
AOG	ZYAS	Anshan Teng'ao Airport	Anshan, Liaoning, China	UTC+08:00	
AOH	KAOH	Lima Allen County Airport	Lima, Ohio, United States	UTC−05:00	Mar-Nov
AOI	LIPY	Ancona Falconara Airport	Ancona, Marche, Italy	UTC+01:00	Mar-Oct
AOJ	RJSA	Aomori Airport	Aomori, Honshu, Japan	UTC+09:00	
AOK	LGKP	Karpathos Island National Airport	Karpathos, Greece	UTC+02:00	Mar-Oct
AOL	SARL	Paso de los Libres Airport	Paso de los Libres, Corrientes, Argentina	UTC−03:00	
AOM		Adam Airport	Adam, Oman	UTC+04:00	
AON		Arona Airport	Arona, Papua New Guinea	UTC+10:00	
AOO	KAOO	Altoona–Blair County Airport	Altoona, Pennsylvania, United States	UTC−05:00	Mar-Nov
AOP		Alférez FAP Alfredo Vladimir Sara Bauer Airport	Andoas, Peru	UTC−05:00	
AOR	WMKA	Sultan Abdul Halim Airport	Alor Setar, Kedah, Malaysia	UTC+08:00	
AOS		Amook Bay Seaplane Base (FAA: AK81)	Amook Bay, Alaska, United States	UTC−09:00	Mar-Nov
AOT	LIMW	Aosta Valley Airport	Aosta, Aosta Valley, Italy	UTC+01:00	Mar-Oct
AOU	VLAP	Attapeu International Airport	Attapeu, Laos	UTC+07:00	
-AP-
APA	KAPA	Centennial Airport	Denver, Colorado, United States	UTC−07:00	Mar-Nov
APB	SLAP	Apolo Airport	Apolo, Bolivia	UTC−04:00	
APC	KAPC	Napa County Airport	Napa, California, United States	UTC−08:00	Mar-Nov
APF	KAPF	Naples Municipal Airport	Naples, Florida, United States	UTC−05:00	Mar-Nov
APG	KAPG	Phillips Army Airfield	Aberdeen Proving Ground, Maryland, United States	UTC−05:00	Mar-Nov
APH	KAPH	A.P. Hill Army Airfield	Fort Walker, Virginia, United States	UTC−05:00	Mar-Nov
API	SKAP	Captain Luis F. Gómez Niño Air Base	Apiay, Colombia	UTC−05:00	
APJ	ZUPL	Ngari Burang Airport	Burang County, Tibet Autonomous Region, China	UTC+08:00	
APK	NTGD	Apataki Airport	Apataki, Tuamotus, French Polynesia	UTC−10:00	
APL	FQNP	Nampula Airport	Nampula, Mozambique	UTC+02:00	
APN	KAPN	Alpena County Regional Airport	Alpena, Michigan, United States	UTC−05:00	Mar-Nov
APO	SKLC	Antonio Roldán Betancourt Airport	Apartadó, Colombia	UTC−05:00	
APP		Asapa Airport	Asapa, Papua New Guinea	UTC+10:00	
APQ	SNAL	Arapiraca Airport	Arapiraca, Alagoas, Brazil	UTC−03:00	
APR	AYPE	April River Airport	April River, Papua New Guinea	UTC+10:00	
APS	SWNS	Anápolis Airport	Anápolis, Goiás, Brazil	UTC−03:00	
APT	KAPT	Marion County Airport (Brown Field)	Jasper, Tennessee, United States	UTC−06:00	Mar-Nov
APU	SSAP	Apucarana Airport	Apucarana, Paraná, Brazil	UTC−03:00	
APV	KAPV	Apple Valley Airport	Apple Valley, California, United States	UTC−08:00	Mar-Nov
APW	NSFA	Faleolo International Airport	Apia, Upolu Island, Samoa	UTC+13:00	Sep-Apr
APX	SSOG	Arapongas Airport	Arapongas, Paraná, Brazil	UTC−03:00	
APY	SNAI	Alto Parnaíba Airport	Alto Parnaíba, Maranhão, Brazil	UTC−03:00	
APZ	SAHZ	Zapala Airport	Zapala, Neuquén, Argentina	UTC−03:00	
-AQ-
AQA	SBAQ	Araraquara Airport	Araraquara, São Paulo, Brazil	UTC−03:00	
AQB	MGQC	Quiché Airport	Quiché, Guatemala	UTC−06:00	
AQG	ZSAQ	Anqing Tianzhushan Airport	Anqing, Anhui, China	UTC+08:00	
AQI	OEPA	Al Qaisumah/Hafr Al Batin Airport	Qaisumah / Hafar al-Batin, Saudi Arabia	UTC+03:00	
AQJ	OJAQ	King Hussein International Airport	Aqaba, Jordan	UTC+02:00	Mar-Oct
AQM		Ariquemes Airport	Ariquemes, Rondônia, Brazil	UTC−04:00	
AQP	SPQU	Rodríguez Ballón International Airport	Arequipa, Peru	UTC−05:00	
AQS		Saqani Airport	Saqani, Fiji	UTC+12:00	Nov-Jan
AQY		Girdwood Airport	Girdwood, Alaska, United States	UTC−09:00	Mar-Nov
-AR-
ARA	KARA	Acadiana Regional Airport	New Iberia, Louisiana, United States	UTC−06:00	Mar-Nov
ARB	KARB	Ann Arbor Municipal Airport	Ann Arbor, Michigan, United States	UTC−05:00	Mar-Nov
ARC	PARC	Arctic Village Airport	Arctic Village, Alaska, United States	UTC−09:00	Mar-Nov
ARD	WATM	Alor Island Airport	Alor Island, Indonesia	UTC+08:00	
ARE	TJAB	Antonio (Nery) Juarbe Pol Airport (FAA: ABO)	Arecibo, Puerto Rico, United States	UTC−04:00	
ARF		Acaricuara Airport	Acaricuara, Colombia	UTC−05:00	
ARG	KARG	Walnut Ridge Regional Airport	Walnut Ridge, Arkansas, United States	UTC−06:00	Mar-Nov
ARH	ULAA	Talagi Airport	Arkhangelsk, Arkhangelsk Oblast, Russia	UTC+03:00	
ARI	SCAR	Chacalluta International Airport	Arica, Chile	UTC−04:00	Aug-May
ARJ	WAJA	Arso Airport	Arso, Indonesia	UTC+09:00	
ARK	HTAR	Arusha Airport	Arusha, Tanzania	UTC+03:00	
ARL	DFER	Arly Airport	Arly, Burkina Faso	UTC+00:00	
ARM	YARM	Armidale Airport	Armidale, New South Wales, Australia	UTC+10:00	Oct-Apr
ARN	ESSA	Stockholm Arlanda Airport	Stockholm, Sweden	UTC+01:00	Mar-Oct
ARO		Arboletes Airport	Arboletes, Colombia	UTC−05:00	
ARP		Aragip Airport	Aragip, Papua New Guinea	UTC+10:00	
ARQ	SKAT	El Troncal Airport	Arauquita, Colombia	UTC−05:00	
ARR	SAVR	Alto Río Senguer Airport	Alto Río Senguer, Chubut, Argentina	UTC−03:00	
ARS	SWEC	Aragarças Airport	Aragarças, Goiás, Brazil	UTC−03:00	
ART	KART	Watertown International Airport	Watertown, New York, United States	UTC−05:00	Mar-Nov
ARU	SBAU	Araçatuba Airport	Araçatuba, São Paulo, Brazil	UTC−03:00	
ARV	KARV	Lakeland Airport (Noble F. Lee Memorial Field)	Minocqua / Woodruff, Wisconsin, United States	UTC−06:00	Mar-Nov
ARW	LRAR	Arad International Airport	Arad, Romania	UTC+02:00	Mar-Oct
ARX	SBAC	Aracati Airport	Aracati, Canoa Quebrada, Brazil	UTC−03:00	
ARY	YARA	Ararat Airport	Ararat, Victoria, Australia	UTC+10:00	Oct-Apr
ARZ	FNZE	N'zeto Airport	N'zeto, Angola	UTC+01:00	
-AS-
ASA	HHSB	Assab International Airport	Assab, Eritrea	UTC+03:00	
ASB	UTAA	Ashgabat International Airport	Ashgabat, Turkmenistan	UTC+05:00	
ASC	SLAS	Ascención de Guarayos Airport	Ascención de Guarayos, Bolivia	UTC−04:00	
ASD	MYAF	Andros Town International Airport	Andros Town, Andros Island, Bahamas	UTC−05:00	Mar-Nov
ASE	KASE	Aspen–Pitkin County Airport (Sardy Field)	Aspen, Colorado, United States	UTC−07:00	Mar-Nov
ASF	URWA	Narimanovo Airport	Astrakhan, Astrakhan Oblast, Russia	UTC+04:00	
ASG	NZAS	Ashburton Aerodrome	Ashburton, New Zealand	UTC+12:00	Sep-Apr
ASH	KASH	Nashua Airport (Boire Field)	Nashua, New Hampshire, United States	UTC−05:00	Mar-Nov
ASI	FHAW	RAF Ascension Island (Wideawake Field)	Ascension Island, British Overseas Territory of Saint Helena, Ascension and Tristan da Cunha	UTC+00:00	
ASJ	RJKA	Amami Airport	Amami, Satsunan Islands, Japan	UTC+09:00	
ASK	DIYO	Yamoussoukro Airport	Yamoussoukro, Côte d'Ivoire	UTC+00:00	
ASL	KASL	Harrison County Airport	Marshall, Texas, United States	UTC−06:00	Mar-Nov
ASM	HHAS	Asmara International Airport	Asmara, Eritrea	UTC+03:00	
ASN	KASN	Talladega Municipal Airport	Talladega, Alabama, United States	UTC−06:00	Mar-Nov
ASO	HASO	Asosa Airport	Asosa, Ethiopia	UTC+03:00	
ASP	YBAS	Alice Springs Airport	Alice Springs, Northern Territory, Australia	UTC+09:30	
ASQ		Austin Airport (FAA: 9U3)	Austin, Nevada, United States	UTC−08:00	Mar-Nov
ASR	LTAU	Erkilet International Airport	Kayseri, Turkey	UTC+03:00	
AST	KAST	Astoria Regional Airport	Astoria, Oregon, United States	UTC−08:00	Mar-Nov
ASU	SGAS	Silvio Pettirossi International Airport	Asunción, Paraguay	UTC−04:00	Oct-Mar
ASV	HKAM	Amboseli Airport	Amboseli, Kenya	UTC+03:00	
ASW	HESN	Aswan International Airport	Aswan, Egypt	UTC+02:00	
ASX	KASX	John F. Kennedy Memorial Airport	Ashland, Wisconsin, United States	UTC−06:00	Mar-Nov
ASY	KASY	Ashley Municipal Airport	Ashley, North Dakota, United States	UTC−06:00	Mar-Nov
ASZ		Asirim Airport	Asirim, Papua New Guinea	UTC+10:00	
-AT-
ATA	SPHZ	Comandante FAP Germán Arias Graziani Airport	Huaraz, Peru	UTC−05:00	
ATB	HSAT	Atbara Airport	Atbara, Sudan	UTC+03:00	
ATC	MYCA	Arthur's Town Airport	Arthur's Town, Cat Island, Bahamas	UTC−05:00	Mar-Nov
ATD	AGAT	Uru Harbour Airport	Atoifi, Malaita, Solomon Islands	UTC+11:00	
ATE		Antlers Municipal Airport (FAA: 80F)	Antlers, Oklahoma, United States	UTC−06:00	Mar-Nov
ATF	SEAM	Chachoan Airport	Ambato, Ecuador	UTC−05:00	
ATG		PAF Base Minhas	Attock, Pakistan	UTC+05:00	
ATH	LGAV	Athens International Airport (Eleftherios Venizelos Airport)	Athens, Greece	UTC+02:00	Mar-Oct
ATI	SUAG	Artigas International Airport	Artigas, Uruguay	UTC−03:00	
ATJ	FMME	Antsirabe Airport	Antsirabe, Madagascar	UTC+03:00	
ATK	PATQ	Atqasuk Edward Burnell Sr. Memorial Airport	Atqasuk, Alaska, United States	UTC−09:00	Mar-Nov
ATL	KATL	Hartsfield–Jackson Atlanta International Airport	Atlanta, Georgia, United States	UTC−05:00	Mar-Nov
ATM	SBHT	Altamira Airport	Altamira, Pará, Brazil	UTC−03:00	
ATN	AYNX	Namatanai Airport	Namatanai, Papua New Guinea	UTC+10:00	
ATO	KUNI	Ohio University Airport (Snyder Field) (FAA: UNI)	Athens / Albany, Ohio, United States	UTC−05:00	Mar-Nov
ATP	AYAI	Aitape Airstrip	Aitape, Papua New Guinea	UTC+10:00	
ATQ	VIAR	Sri Guru Ram Dass Jee International Airport	Amritsar, Punjab, India	UTC+05:30	
ATR	GQPA	Atar International Airport	Atar, Mauritania	UTC+00:00	
ATS	KATS	Artesia Municipal Airport	Artesia, New Mexico, United States	UTC−07:00	Mar-Nov
ATT		Atmautluak Airport (FAA: 4A2)	Atmautluak, Alaska, United States	UTC−09:00	Mar-Nov
ATU	PAAT	Casco Cove Coast Guard Station	Attu Island, Alaska, United States	UTC−10:00	Mar-Nov
ATV	FTTI	Ati Airport	Ati, Chad	UTC+01:00	
ATW	KATW	Appleton International Airport	Appleton, Wisconsin, United States	UTC−06:00	Mar-Nov
ATX		Atbasar Airport	Atbasar, Kazakhstan	UTC+06:00	
ATY	KATY	Watertown Regional Airport	Watertown, South Dakota, United States	UTC−06:00	Mar-Nov
ATZ	HEAT	Assiut Airport	Assiut, Egypt	UTC+02:00	
-AU-
AUA	TNCA	Queen Beatrix International Airport	Aruba, Kingdom of the Netherlands	UTC−04:00	
AUC	SKUC	Santiago Pérez Quiroz Airport	Arauca, Colombia	UTC−05:00	
AUD	YAGD	Augustus Downs Airport	Augustus Downs Station, Queensland, Australia	UTC+10:00	
AUE		Abu Rudeis Airport	Abou Redis, Egypt	UTC+02:00	
AUF	LFLA	Auxerre – Branches Aerodrome	Auxerre, Burgundy, France	UTC+01:00	Mar-Oct
AUG	KAUG	Augusta State Airport	Augusta, Maine, United States	UTC−05:00	Mar-Nov
AUH	OMAA	Abu Dhabi International Airport	Abu Dhabi, United Arab Emirates	UTC+04:00	
AUI	AYND	Aua Island Airport	Aua Island, Papua New Guinea	UTC+10:00	
AUJ	AYAT	Ambunti Airport	Ambunti, Papua New Guinea	UTC+10:00	
AUK		Alakanuk Airport	Alakanuk, Alaska, United States	UTC−09:00	Mar-Nov
AUL		Aur Airport	Aur Atoll, Marshall Islands	UTC+12:00	
AUM	KAUM	Austin Municipal Airport	Austin, Minnesota, United States	UTC−06:00	Mar-Nov
AUN	KAUN	Auburn Municipal Airport	Auburn, California, United States	UTC−08:00	Mar-Nov
AUO	KAUO	Auburn University Regional Airport	Auburn, Alabama, United States	UTC−06:00	Mar-Nov
AUP	AYAG	Agaun Airport	Agaun, Papua New Guinea	UTC+10:00	
AUQ	NTMN	Atuona Airport	Atuona, Marquesas Islands, French Polynesia	UTC−09:30	
AUR	LFLW	Aurillac – Tronquières Airport	Aurillac, Auvergne, France	UTC+01:00	Mar-Oct
AUS	KAUS	Austin–Bergstrom International Airport	Austin, Texas, United States	UTC−06:00	Mar-Nov
AUT	WPAT	Atauro Airport	Atauro Island, East Timor	UTC+09:00	
AUU	YAUR	Aurukun Airport	Aurukun, Queensland, Australia	UTC+10:00	
AUV	AYUM	Aumo Airport	Aumo, Papua New Guinea	UTC+10:00	
AUW	KAUW	Wausau Downtown Airport	Wausau, Wisconsin, United States	UTC−06:00	Mar-Nov
AUX	SWGN	Araguaína Airport	Araguaína, Tocantins, Brazil	UTC−03:00	
AUY	NVVA	Anatom Airport	Anatom Island, Tafea, Vanuatu	UTC+11:00	
AUZ	KARR	Aurora Municipal Airport (FAA: ARR)	Aurora, Illinois, United States	UTC−06:00	Mar-Nov
-AV-
AVA	ZUAS	Anshun Huangguoshu Airport	Anshun, Guizhou, China	UTC+08:00	
AVB	LIPA	Aviano Air Base	Aviano, Pordenone, Italy	UTC+01:00	Mar-Oct
AVG	YAUV	Auvergne Airport	Auvergne Station, Northern Territory, Australia	UTC+09:30	
AVI	MUCA	Máximo Gómez Airport	Ciego de Ávila, Cuba	UTC−05:00	Mar-Nov
AVK	ZMAH	Arvaikheer Airport	Arvaikheer, Mongolia	UTC+08:00	
AVL	KAVL	Asheville Regional Airport	Asheville, North Carolina, United States	UTC−05:00	Mar-Nov
AVN	LFMV	Avignon – Provence Airport	Avignon, Provence-Alpes-Côte d'Azur, France	UTC+01:00	Mar-Oct
AVO	KAVO	Avon Park Executive Airport	Avon Park, Florida, United States	UTC−05:00	Mar-Nov
AVP	KAVP	Wilkes-Barre/Scranton International Airport	Wilkes-Barre / Scranton, Pennsylvania, United States	UTC−05:00	Mar-Nov
AVR	VAAM	Amravati Airport	Amravati, Maharashtra, India	UTC+05:30	
AVU	AGGJ	Avu Avu Airport	Avu Avu, Guadalcanal, Solomon Islands	UTC+11:00	
AVV	YMAV	Avalon Airport	Avalon, Victoria, Australia	UTC+10:00	Oct-Apr
AVW	KAVQ	Marana Regional Airport (FAA: AVQ)	Tucson, Arizona, United States	UTC−07:00	
AVX	KAVX	Catalina Airport	Avalon, California, United States	UTC−08:00	Mar-Nov
-AW-
AWA	HALA	Awasa Airport	Awasa, Ethiopia	UTC+03:00	
AWB	AYAW	Awaba Airport	Awaba, Papua New Guinea	UTC+10:00	
AWD	NVVB	Aniwa Airport	Aniwa Island, Tafea, Vanuatu	UTC+11:00	
AWE		Alowe Airport	Alowe, Gabon	UTC+01:00	
AWK	PWAK	Wake Island Airfield	Wake Island, United States Minor Outlying Islands	UTC+12:00	
AWM	KAWM	West Memphis Municipal Airport	West Memphis, Arkansas, United States	UTC−06:00	Mar-Nov
AWN		Alton Downs Airport	Alton Downs, South Australia, Australia	UTC+09:30	Oct-Apr
AWP		Austral Downs Airport	Austral Downs, Northern Territory, Australia	UTC+09:30	
AWR		Awar Airport	Awar, Papua New Guinea	UTC+10:00	
AWZ	OIAW	Ahvaz International Airport	Ahvaz, Iran	UTC+03:30	Mar-Sep
-AX-
AXA	TQPF	Clayton J. Lloyd International Airport	The Valley, British Overseas Territory of Anguilla	UTC−04:00	
AXB		Maxson Airfield (FAA: 89N)	Alexandria Bay, New York, United States	UTC−05:00	Mar-Nov
AXC	YAMC	Aramac Airport	Aramac, Queensland, Australia	UTC+10:00	
AXD	LGAL	Alexandroupoli Airport (Dimokritos Airport)	Alexandroupoli, Greece	UTC+02:00	Mar-Oct
AXE		Xanxere Airport	Xanxerê, Santa Catarina, Brazil	UTC−03:00	
AXF		Alxa Left Banner Bayanhot Airport	Alxa Left Banner, Inner Mongolia, China	UTC+08:00	
AXG	KAXA	Algona Municipal Airport (FAA: AXA)	Algona, Iowa, United States	UTC−06:00	Mar-Nov
AXJ	RJDA	Amakusa Airfield	Amakusa, Amakusa Islands, Japan	UTC+09:00	
AXK	OYAT	Ataq Airport	Ataq, Yemen	UTC+03:00	
AXL		Alexandria Airport	Alexandria Station, Northern Territory, Australia	UTC+09:30	
AXM	SKAR	El Edén International Airport	Armenia, Colombia	UTC−05:00	
AXN	KAXN	Alexandria Municipal Airport (Chandler Field)	Alexandria, Minnesota, United States	UTC−06:00	Mar-Nov
AXP	MYAP	Spring Point Airport	Spring Point, Acklins Island, Bahamas	UTC−05:00	Mar-Nov
AXR	NTGU	Arutua Airport	Arutua, Tuamotus, French Polynesia	UTC−10:00	
AXS	KAXS	Altus/Quartz Mountain Regional Airport	Altus, Oklahoma, United States	UTC−06:00	Mar-Nov
AXT	RJSK	Akita Airport	Akita, Honshu, Japan	UTC+09:00	
AXU	HAAX	Axum Airport	Axum, Ethiopia	UTC+03:00	
AXV	KAXV	Neil Armstrong Airport	Wapakoneta, Ohio, United States	UTC−05:00	Mar-Nov
AXX	KAXX	Angel Fire Airport	Angel Fire, New Mexico, United States	UTC−07:00	Mar-Nov
-AY-
AYA		Ayapel Airport	Ayapel, Colombia	UTC−05:00	
AYC		Ayacucho Airport	Ayacucho, Colombia	UTC−05:00	
AYD		Alroy Downs Airport	Alroy Downs, Northern Territory, Australia	UTC+09:30	
AYG	SKYA	Yaguara Airport	Yaguara, Colombia	UTC−05:00	
AYI		Yari Airport	Yari, Colombia	UTC−05:00	
AYJ	VEAY	Ayodhya Airport	Ayodhya, Uttar Pradesh, India	UTC+05:30	
AYK	UAUR	Arkalyk Airport	Arkalyk, Kazakhstan	UTC+06:00	
AYL		Anthony Lagoon Airport	Anthony Lagoon, Northern Territory, Australia	UTC+09:30	
AYM		Yas Island Seaplane Base	Yas Island, Abu Dhabi, United Arab Emirates	UTC+04:00	
AYN	ZHAY	Anyang Airport	Anyang, Henan, China	UTC+08:00	
AYO	SGAY	Juan de Ayolas Airport	Ayolas, Paraguay	UTC−04:00	Oct-Mar
AYP	SPHO	Coronel FAP Alfredo Mendívil Duarte Airport	Ayacucho, Peru	UTC−05:00	
AYQ	YAYE	Ayers Rock Airport	Yulara, Northern Territory, Australia	UTC+09:30	
AYR	YAYR	Ayr Airport	Ayr, Queensland, Australia	UTC+10:00	
AYS	KAYS	Waycross–Ware County Airport	Waycross, Georgia, United States	UTC−05:00	Mar-Nov
AYT	LTAI	Antalya Airport	Antalya, Turkey	UTC+03:00	
AYU	AYAY	Aiyura Airport	Aiyura, Papua New Guinea	UTC+10:00	
AYW	WASA	Ayawasi Airport	Ayawasi, West Papua, Indonesia	UTC+08:00	
AYX	SPAY	Tnte. Gral. Gerardo Pérez Pinedo Airport	Atalaya Province, Department of Ucayali, Peru	UTC−05:00	
AYY		Arugam Bay Seaplane Base	Pottuvil, Sri Lanka	UTC+05:30	
-AZ-
AZA	KIWA	Phoenix–Mesa Gateway Airport (FAA: IWA)	Phoenix, Arizona, United States	UTC−07:00	
AZB		Amazon Bay Airport	Amazon Bay, Papua New Guinea	UTC+10:00	
AZD	OIYY	Shahid Sadooghi Airport	Yazd, Iran	UTC+03:30	Mar-Sep
AZG		Pablo L. Sidar Airport	Apatzingán, Michoacán, Mexico	UTC−06:00	Apr-Oct
AZI	OMAD	Al Bateen Executive Airport	Abu Dhabi, United Arab Emirates	UTC+04:00	
AZL	SWTU	Fazenda Tucunaré Airport	Sapezal, Mato Grosso, Brazil	UTC−04:00	
AZN	UTFA	Andizhan Airport	Andizhan, Uzbekistan	UTC+05:00	
AZO	KAZO	Kalamazoo/Battle Creek International Airport	Kalamazoo, Michigan, United States	UTC−05:00	Mar-Nov
AZP	MMJC	Jorge Jiménez Cantú National Airport	Ciudad López Mateos, State of Mexico, Mexico	UTC−06:00	Apr-Oct
AZR	DAUA	Touat-Cheikh Sidi Mohamed Belkebir Airport	Adrar, Algeria	UTC+01:00	
AZS	MDCY	Samaná El Catey International Airport	El Catey, Dominican Republic	UTC−04:00	
AZT		Zapatoca Airport	Zapatoca, Colombia	UTC−05:00	
AZZ	FNAM	Ambriz Airport	Ambriz, Angola	UTC+01:00	

== Notes ==
- ^1 Morocco temporarily suspends DST for the month of Ramadan.
