= ADC =

ADC may refer to:

== Aviation ==
- ADC Aircraft, a British firm established in 1920
- ADC Airlines, based in Ikeja, Nigeria
- Aerospace Defense Command, of the U.S. Air Force
- Air data computer, an essential avionics component found in modern glass cockpits
- Andakombe Airport in Eastern Highlands Province, Papua New Guinea (IATA airport code ADC)

== Organisations ==
=== Arts ===
- ADC Theatre, venue of the University of Cambridge Amateur Dramatic Club
- Art Directors Club of New York, a professional association
- Australian Dance Council, a national dance advocacy organisation
- Hong Kong Arts Development Council, a statutory body in Hong Kong

=== Government and politics ===
- Aboriginal Development Commission, an Australian statutory body that existed from 1980 to 1990
- African Democratic Congress, a political party in Nigeria
- Alliance for Democratic Change, a political party in Tanzania
- American-Arab Anti-Discrimination Committee, a civil rights organization
- American Deserters Committee, an anti-Vietnam War group
- Arizona Department of Corrections, US
- Arkansas Department of Correction, US
- Ashfield District Council, Nottinghamshire, England
- Asociación Democrática de Colima, a political party from the State of Colima, Mexico

=== Others ===
- Acadia Divinity College, a seminary on the campus of Acadia University, Canada
- ADC Map, an American map publisher
- ADC Telecommunications, in Eden Prairie, Minnesota
- Australian Defence College, Weston Creek, Canberra
- Advanced Digital Corporation, a defunct computer company of Southern California

== Science and medicine ==
- ADC (gene), a human gene
- AIDS dementia complex, neurological disorder associated with HIV and AIDS
- Allyl diglycol carbonate or CR-39, a polymer
- Antibody-drug conjugate, a type of anticancer treatment
- Apparent diffusion coefficient, a derived value from a diffusion MRI
- Automated dispensing cabinet, a computerized drug storage device for hospitals
- Azodicarbonamide, a blowing agent
- Accretion disk corona, an area of hot plasma around an accretion disk

== Technology ==
- Advanced Direct Connect, a peer-to-peer file sharing and chat protocol
- Analog-to-digital converter, a type of electronic circuit
- Android Developer Challenge, a competition
- Apple Developer Connection, Apple Computer's developer network
- Apple Display Connector, similar to the DVI connector
- Application delivery controller, for accelerating website performance
- Automatic Data Capture, for automatic identification, data collection and storage into computer systems

== Other uses ==
- Alphonse Pyramus de Candolle (1806–1893), French-Swiss botanist (taxonomic author abbreviation "A.DC.")
- Adlington (Cheshire) railway station, UK (National Rail code)
- Aide-de-camp, assistant to a senior military or government person
- Aid to Dependent Children, an American government social program from 1935 to 1960
- Alternative Daily cover, material other than soil for containment in a landfill
- Andrew Dice Clay (born 1957), American comedian
- Axiom of dependent choice
- New Zealand ADC class diesel multiple unit, a type of diesel railway vehicle used on Auckland's suburban network
