= AEQ =

Aeq or AEQ may refer to:

== Aviation ==
- Air Express Sweden (ICAO airline designator AEQ)
- Ar Horqin Airport in Inner Mongolia Region, China (IATA airport code AEQ)

== Language ==
- Aequian language, abbreviated Aeq.
- Aer language, ISO 639 code aeq

== Publications ==
- Adult Education Quarterly
- Air Enthusiast Quarterly
- Anthropology & Education Quarterly
- Applied Economics Quarterly, published by the German Institute for Economic Research
