= AYY =

AYY may refer to:

- 'Ayy, a district in Karak Governorate, Jordan
- Aalto University Student Union (Finnish: Aalto-yliopiston ylioppilaskunta), Espoo, Finland
- Arugam Bay Seaplane Base (IATA: AYY), Pottuvil, Sri Lanka
- The code for Ayeyarwady Region in vehicle registration plates of Myanmar
- A common prefix for a demi unit load device
- ISO 639:ayy, a spurious ISO 639-3 code for the purported Tayabas Ayta language
