= ADN =

ADN may refer to:

== Education ==
- Associate Degree in Nursing, similar to Associate of Science in Nursing
- A common term for the student section of Athens Drive High School

== Media ==
=== Television and radio ===
- XHTVM-TDT, branded as adn Noticias, a Mexican television channel
- ADN Radio, a Chilean radio station

=== Newspapers ===
- ADN (newspaper), a Spanish free daily newspaper
- Allgemeiner Deutscher Nachrichtendienst, the state news agency of East Germany
- Anchorage Daily News, an Alaskan newspaper

=== Other media ===
- ADN, the original French title of DNA, a 2020 drama film

== Politics ==
- National Democratic Alliance (Italy) (Italian: Alleanza Democratica Nazionale), a former political party of Italy
- National Democratic Alternative (Portugal) (Portuguese: Aliança Democrática Nacional), a political party of Portugal
- Nationalist Democratic Action (Spanish: Acción Democrática Nacionalista), a political party of Bolivia
- National Democratic Action (Acción Democrática Nacional, ADN), a political party of Ecuador

== Science and technology ==
- Abbreviated Dialing Numbers, two or three digits sequence to reach specific telephone numbers, such as those of public services
- Adiponitrile
- Aircraft Data Network, a proposed network standard for commercial aircraft installations
- Ammonium dinitramide, a rocket propellant
- Application Delivery Network, a suite of technologies for improved delivery of applications across the Internet
- Auditory Disability with Normal hearing, a term for King-Kopetzky syndrome
- Digital Negative (file format), a raw image format designed by Adobe Systems
- DNA, as abbreviated in various languages (particularly Romance languages such as Spanish and French)

== Transport infrastructure ==
- Andes Airport in Antioquia Department, Colombia (IATA airport code ADN)
- Ardrossan Town railway station, UK
- Ashley, Drew and Northern Railway, a defunct railroad in Arkansas

== Other uses ==
- Abbreviated dialing number
- Adang language, a Trans-New Guinea language of Indonesia
- Aberdeen Asset Management (stock symbol "ADN")
- App.net, an online social networking service
- European Agreement concerning the International Carriage of Dangerous Goods by Inland Waterways, part of the UN Recommendations on the Transport of Dangerous Goods
