= AFRS =

AFRS may refer to:

- Armed Forces Radio Service, a predecessor of the American Forces Network
- Avon Fire and Rescue Service, England

== See also ==
- AFR (disambiguation)
