= TKE =

TKE may refer to:

- Tau Kappa Epsilon, a college fraternity.
- Tenakee Seaplane Base, Tenakee Springs, Alaska, IATA code TKE
- TK Elevator
- Turbulence kinetic energy, a property of turbulent flows.
