= AGK =

AGK may refer to:

- Aggreko, UK temporary power generation company LSE code
- AGK (gene), human gene that encodes the enzyme Acylglycerol kinase
- Alpha Gamma Kappa, a fraternal organization for students and practitioners of podiatric medicine in the US and Canada
- Angry German Kid, a 2006 video about a teenager named Leopold Slikk
- AppGameKit, a computer program development system
- Astronomische Gesellschaft Katalog, an astrometric star catalogue
- Inagta Partido language, by ISO 639-3 language code
- AG København, Danish former handball club
- Kagua Airport in Southern Highlands Province, Papua New Guinea (IATA airport code AGK)
