= ABPS =

ABPS may refer to:

- Advanced Bio Prosthetic Surfaces
- Akhil Bharatiya Pratinidhi Sabha
- American Baptist Publication Society
- American Board of Physician Specialties
- American Board of Plastic Surgery
- American Board of Podiatric Surgery
- Associated Fellow of the British Psychological Society
- Associate Member of the Bangladesh Photographic Society
- Association of British Philatelic Societies

== See also ==
- ABP (disambiguation)
