= AEK (disambiguation) =

AEK may refer to:

== Sports organizations ==
- A.E.K. (sports club), from Athens, Greece, the best known club by this name
  - AEK Athens F.C., an association football team
  - AEK B.C., an association basketball team
  - AEK Futsal, a futsal team
  - AEK H.C., a handball team
  - AEK V.C., a men's volleyball team
  - AEK Women's V.C., a women's volleyball team
- AEK Kouklia, an association football club in Kouklia, Cyprus, dissolved in 2014
- AEK Larnaca FC, an association football club in Larnaca, Cyprus

== Other uses ==
- AEK-999, a Russian machine gun
- AEK-971, a Russian assault rifle
- Agricultural and Labour Party or AEK, a political party in Greece
- Alfabetatze Euskalduntze Koordinakundea
- Apple Extended Keyboard, a computer keyboard
- Aseki Airport in Momase Region, Papua New Guinea (IATA airport code AEK)
- Haeke language
