= AFR =

AFR may refer to:

== Media ==
- AFR (film), 2007
- After Further Review, sports program on BYU TV
- American Family Radio, a network of radio stations in US
- Armed Forces Radio, original name of American Forces Network
- Australian Financial Review, a business newspaper
- Les Assassins des Fauteils Rollents, fictional terrorist organization in the 1996 novel Infinite Jest by David Foster Wallace

== Companies and organizations ==
- Air France, ICAO code
- American Film Renaissance, a US film institute
- Americans for Financial Reform, an organisation in US
- Arbel Fauvet Rail, a French rolling stock manufacturer

== Other uses ==
- Afrikaans language, ISO-639 code
- Afore Airstrip in Oro Province, Papua New Guinea (IATA airport code AFR)
- Air–fuel ratio, an engineering term
- Alternate frame rendering, a computer term
- American flag rugby, a variant of Rugby Union
- Annual Financial report
- Annualized failure rate, a measure of reliability
- As Friends Rust, an American melodic hardcore band
- Automatic facial recognition, also known as live facial recognition
- A short form for the continent of Africa
