= ABP =

ABP may refer to:

== Arts and media ==
- Alaskan Bush People, a Discovery Channel show with three seasons
- Amagi Brilliant Park, an anime series

== Businesses and organizations ==
=== Companies ===
- Associated British Ports, port operator in the UK
- Au Bon Pain, a fast-casual bakery/cafe chain
- Stichting Pensioenfonds ABP, a European pension fund for government workers in the Netherlands
- ABP Group, Indian media conglomerate
  - Anandabazar Patrika, newspaper owned by the group, origin of the company's name
  - ABP News, Indian Hindi-language free-to-air television news channel owned by the company

=== Other organizations ===
- AB Pacense, a Spanish basketball team based in Badajoz
- Afghan Border Police
- American Board of Pediatrics, US certifying board for pediatrics and several of its sub-specialties
- American Board of Periodontology, US certifying board for periodontology
- Associated Baptist Press, a religious news agency
- An Bord Pleanála, Ireland, now An Coimisiún Pleanála, rules on planning appeals

== Science and technology ==
=== Biology and medicine ===
- Ambulatory blood pressure, a method to monitor blood pressure
- Arterial blood pressure, the blood pressure in the arteries
- Androgen-binding protein, a glycoprotein
- Actin-binding protein, proteins which attach to the protein actin
- Animal by-products

=== Computing ===
- Adblock Plus, blocks ads, trackers etc.
- Alternating bit protocol, a data link layer network protocol

== Other uses ==
- Alton B. Parker, American judge and Democratic nominee for president in 1904
- Abellen language, a Sambalic language of the Philippines
- Apostolic Bible Polyglot
- The title of Archbishop (as a written abbreviation)
- Assumption-based planning, a post-planning method in project management
- Athlete biological passport, an electronic record used to detect anti-doping rule violations in athletes
- Atkamba Airport in Western Province, Papua New Guinea (IATA airport code ABP)
