= AZIN2 =

Protein-coding gene in humans

Identifiers
- Aliases: AZIN2, ADC, AZI2, ODC-p, ODC1L, ODCp, AZIB1, antizyme inhibitor 2
- External IDs: OMIM: 608353; MGI: 2442093; GeneCards: AZIN2

Gene location (Human)
Chr.	Chromosome 1 (human)
Band	1p35.1	Start	33,081,104 bp
Band	1p35.1	End	33,123,492 bp

Gene location (Mouse)
Chr.	Chromosome 4 (mouse)
Band	4|4 D2.2	Start	128,824,026 bp
Band	4|4 D2.2	End	128,856,235 bp
RNA expression pattern
Bgee	Human / Mouse (ortholog); Top expressed in: right testis; left testis; C1 segment; prefrontal cortex; corpus callosum; Brodmann area 9; right frontal lobe; substantia nigra; cingulate gyrus; anterior cingulate cortex / Top expressed in: seminiferous tubule; spermatid; lumbar spinal ganglion; dentate gyrus of hippocampal formation granule cell; lens; spermatocyte; primary visual cortex; superior frontal gyrus; Rostral migratory stream; neural layer of retina; More reference expression data
BioGPS	n/a
Gene ontology
Molecular function	putrescine transmembrane transporter activity; catalytic activity; protein binding; ornithine decarboxylase activator activity; arginine decarboxylase activity; ornithine decarboxylase activity
Cellular component	transport vesicle; cytoplasm; mitochondrion; trans-Golgi network; cell projection; Golgi apparatus; nucleus; axon; granular vesicle; membrane; dendrite; perinuclear region of cytoplasm; cis-Golgi network; cytoplasmic vesicle; perikaryon; endoplasmic reticulum-Golgi intermediate compartment membrane; endoplasmic reticulum-Golgi intermediate compartment; cytosol
Biological process	positive regulation of polyamine transmembrane transport; spermatogenesis; putrescine transport; ornithine metabolic process; putrescine biosynthetic process from ornithine; trans-Golgi network membrane organization; agmatine biosynthetic process; positive regulation of catalytic activity; polyamine biosynthetic process; negative regulation of protein catabolic process
Sources:Amigo / QuickGO
Orthologs
Databases	NCBI: entry; OMA: entry
Species	Human	Mouse
Entrez	113451	242669
Ensembl	ENSG00000142920	ENSMUSG00000028789
UniProt	Q96A70	Q8BVM4
RefSeq (mRNA)	NM_001293562; NM_001301823; NM_001301824; NM_001301825; NM_001301826 NM_052998; NM_001350398; NM_001350399; NM_001350400; NM_001350401; NM_001350402; NM_001376722; NM_001376724; NM_001376725; NM_001376727; NM_001376729; NM_001376730; NM_001376732	NM_001301841; NM_172875
RefSeq (protein)	NP_001280491; NP_001288752; NP_001288753; NP_001288754; NP_001288755 NP_443724; NP_001337327; NP_001337328; NP_001337329; NP_001337330; NP_001337331; NP_001363651; NP_001363653; NP_001363654; NP_001363656; NP_001363658; NP_001363659; NP_001363661	NP_001288770; NP_766463
Location (UCSC)	Chr 1: 33.08 – 33.12 Mb	Chr 4: 128.82 – 128.86 Mb
PubMed search
- Wikidata
View/Edit Human	View/Edit Mouse

Antizyme inhibitor 2 (AzI2) also erroneously known as arginine decarboxylase (ADC) is a protein that in humans is encoded by the AZIN2 gene. In contrast to initial suggestions, Antizyme inhibitor 2 does not act as arginine decarboxylase (ADC) in mammalian cells
