= Tenakee Seaplane Base =

Airport in Alaska, United States

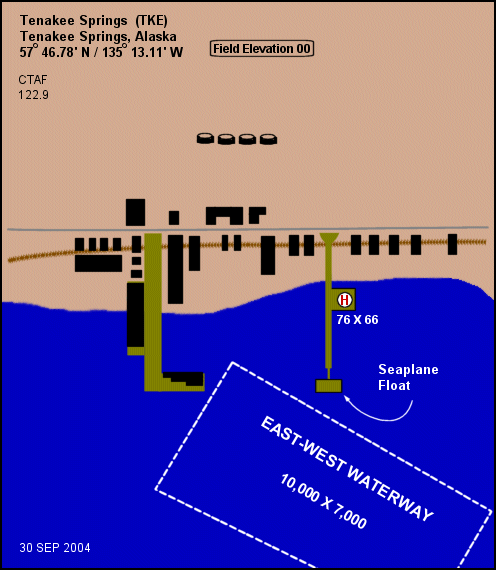
- IATA: TKE; ICAO: none; FAA LID: TKE

Summary
- Airport type: Public
- Owner: State of Alaska DOT&PF - Southeast Region
- Serves: Tenakee Springs, Alaska
- Elevation AMSL: 0 ft (0 m)
- Coordinates: 57°46′47″N 135°13′06″W

Map
- Location of airport in Alaska TKE (the United States)

Runways
Direction	Length		Surface
Direction	ft	m	Surface
E/W	10,000	3,048	Water

Helipads
Number	Length		Surface
Number	ft	m	Surface
H1	76	23	Wood

Statistics (2006)
- Aircraft operations: 650
- Source: Federal Aviation Administration

Tenakee Seaplane Base (IATA: TKE, FAA LID: TKE) is a state-owned public-use seaplane base located in Tenakee Springs, a city on Chichagof Island in the Hoonah-Angoon Census Area of the U.S. state of Alaska. Scheduled airline service is subsidized by the Essential Air Service program.

The National Plan of Integrated Airport Systems for 2015-2019 categorized it as a general aviation airport based on 657 enplanements (passenger boardings) in 2012 (the commercial service category requires at least 2,500 enplanements per year). As per the Federal Aviation Administration, this airport had 639 enplanements in calendar year 2008, 617 enplanements in 2009, and 645 in 2010.

== Facilities and aircraft ==
Tenakee Seaplane Base has a seaplane landing area designated E/W which measures 10,000 by 7,000 feet (3,048 x 2,134 m). It also has a helipad designated H1 with a wood surface measuring 76 by 66 feet (23 x 20 m).

For the 12-month period ending December 31, 2006, it had 650 aircraft operations, an average of 54 per month: 77% air taxi and 23% general aviation.

== Airlines and destinations ==
The following airline offers scheduled passenger service:

Airlines	Destinations
Alaska Seaplanes	Juneau

=== Statistics ===
Carrier shares: January – December 2013
Carrier	Passengers (arriving and departing)
Alaska	1,380(100%)

Top domestic destinations: Jan. – Dec. 2013
Rank	City	Airport name & IATA code	Passengers	
Rank	City	Airport name & IATA code	2013	2012
1	Juneau, AK	Juneau International (JNU)	70	60
2	Angoon, AK	Angoon Seaplane Base (AGN)	60	10

== See also ==
- Angoon Seaplane Base (57°30′13″N 134°35′06″W)
- List of airports in Alaska
