= Adult Education Quarterly =

- Discipline: Education
- Language: English
- Edited by: Ellen Boeren, Kevin M. Roessger, and Elizabeth A. Roumell

Publication details
- Former name: Adult Education
- History: 1950-present
- Publisher: SAGE Publications on behalf of the American Association of Adult and Continuing Education (United States)
- Frequency: Quarterly
- Impact factor: 1.968 (2020)

Standard abbreviations
- ISO 4: Adult Educ. Q.

Indexing
- ISSN: 0741-7136 (print); 1552-3047 (web)
- LCCN: 84642128
- OCLC no.: 9406042

Links
- Journal homepage; Online access; Online archive

Adult Education Quarterly is a quarterly peer-reviewed academic journal covering the field of education. It was established in 1950 and is published by SAGE Publications on behalf of the American Association of Adult and Continuing Education. As of 2019, the editors-in-chief have been Ellen Boeren (University of Glasgow), Kevin M. Roessger (University of Arkansas), and Elizabeth A. Roumell (Texas A&M University).

== Abstracting and indexing ==
The journal is abstracted and indexed in Scopus, ERIC, EBSCO databases, ProQuest databases, and the Social Sciences Citation Index. According to the Journal Citation Reports, its 2020 impact factor is 1.968, ranking it 96th out of 238 journals in the category "Education & Educational Research".
