= Agaun Airport =

Airport in Papua New Guinea

- IATA: AUP; ICAO: AYAG

Summary
- Location: Agaun, Papua New Guinea
- Elevation AMSL: 3,200 ft / 975 m
- Coordinates: 9°55.85′S 149°23.14′E

Map
- Location of airport in Papua New Guinea

Runways
Direction	Length		Surface
Direction	m	ft	Surface
06/24	885	2,903
- Source: PNG Airstrip Guide

Agaun Airport (IATA: AUP, ICAO: AYAG) is an airfield in Agaun, in the Milne Bay Province of Papua New Guinea. Located at an altitude of 975 m, the airport has a single runway.
