= Vehicle registration plates of Myanmar =

Republic of the Union of Myanmar
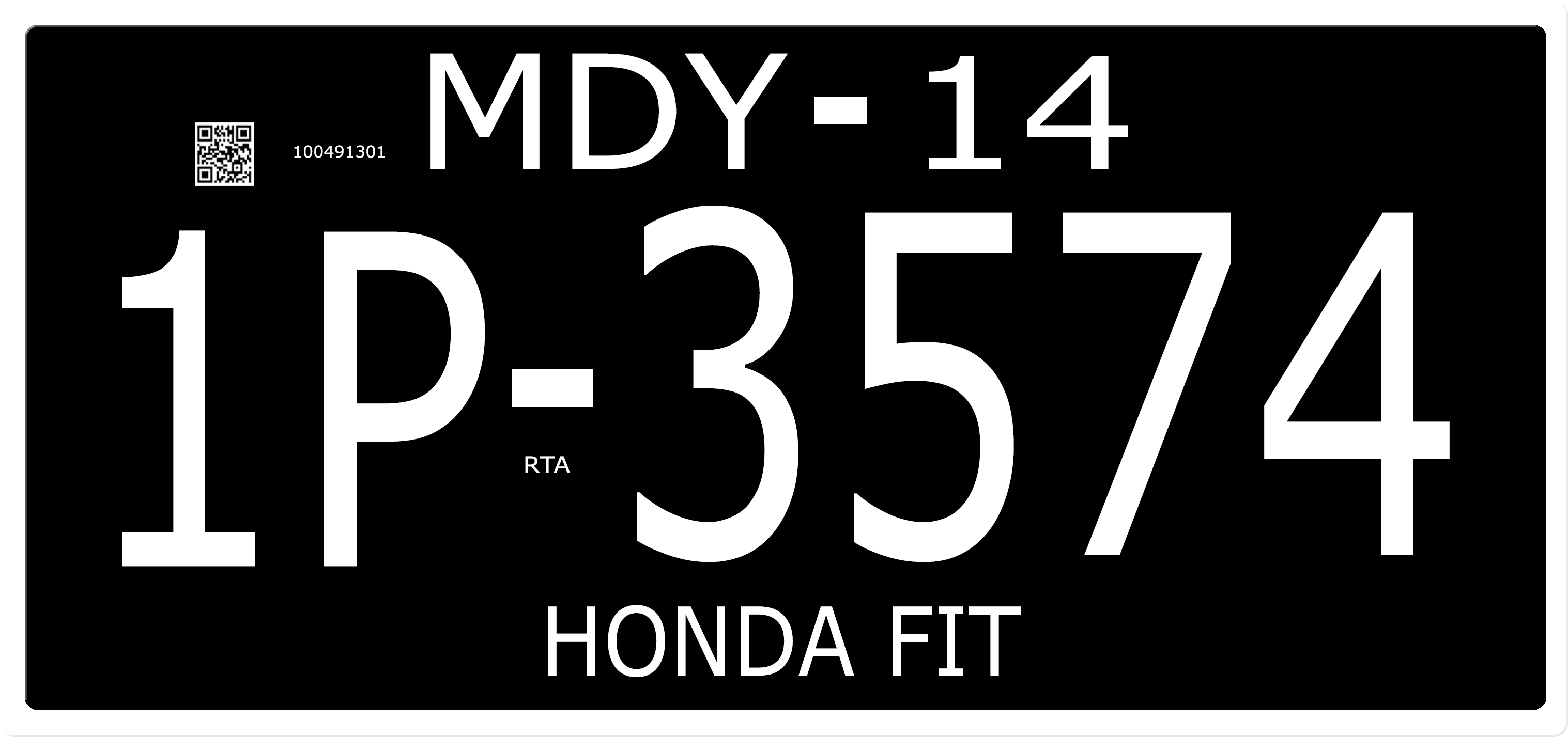
- Current regular legal standard number plate from Myanmar.
- Country: Myanmar
- Country code: MYA

Current series
- Size: 6.4 in x 14.1 in 358 mm × 162 mm
- Serial format: Not standard
- Colour (front): White on Black
- Colour (rear): White on Black
- Introduced: 1 July 2021

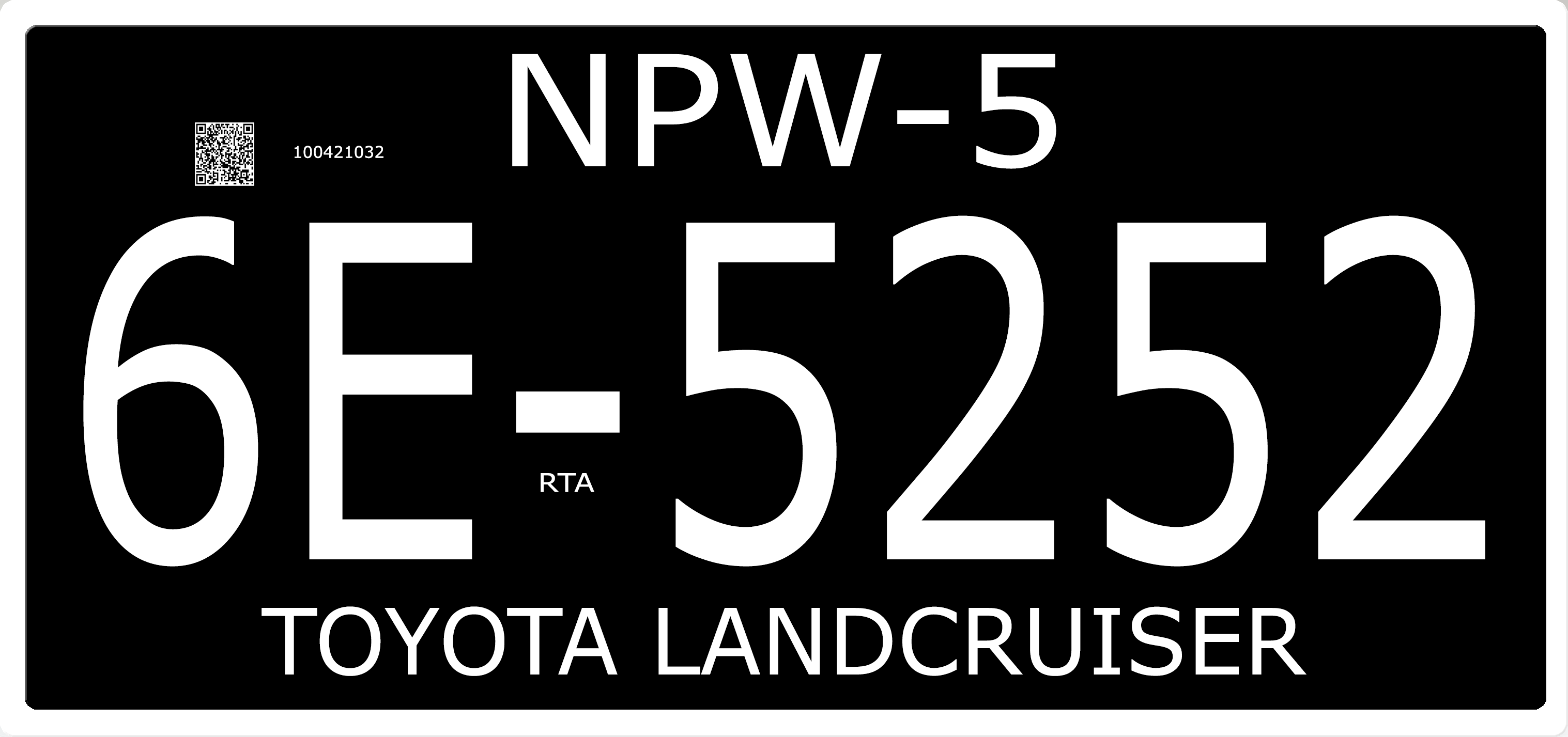
Private vehicle plate.

Vehicle Registration Plates of Myanmar (Burma) were introduced in 1999 and are administered by the Road Transport Administration Department (RTAD), under the Ministry of Transport and Communications. The latest format of the plates was introduced in July 2021.

The current plates contain a three letter regional code followed by a numeral representing the township (such as YGN-38 for Yangon Region, Dagon Township) above a six character alphanumeric serial number, and the make and model of the registered vehicle below the serial number.

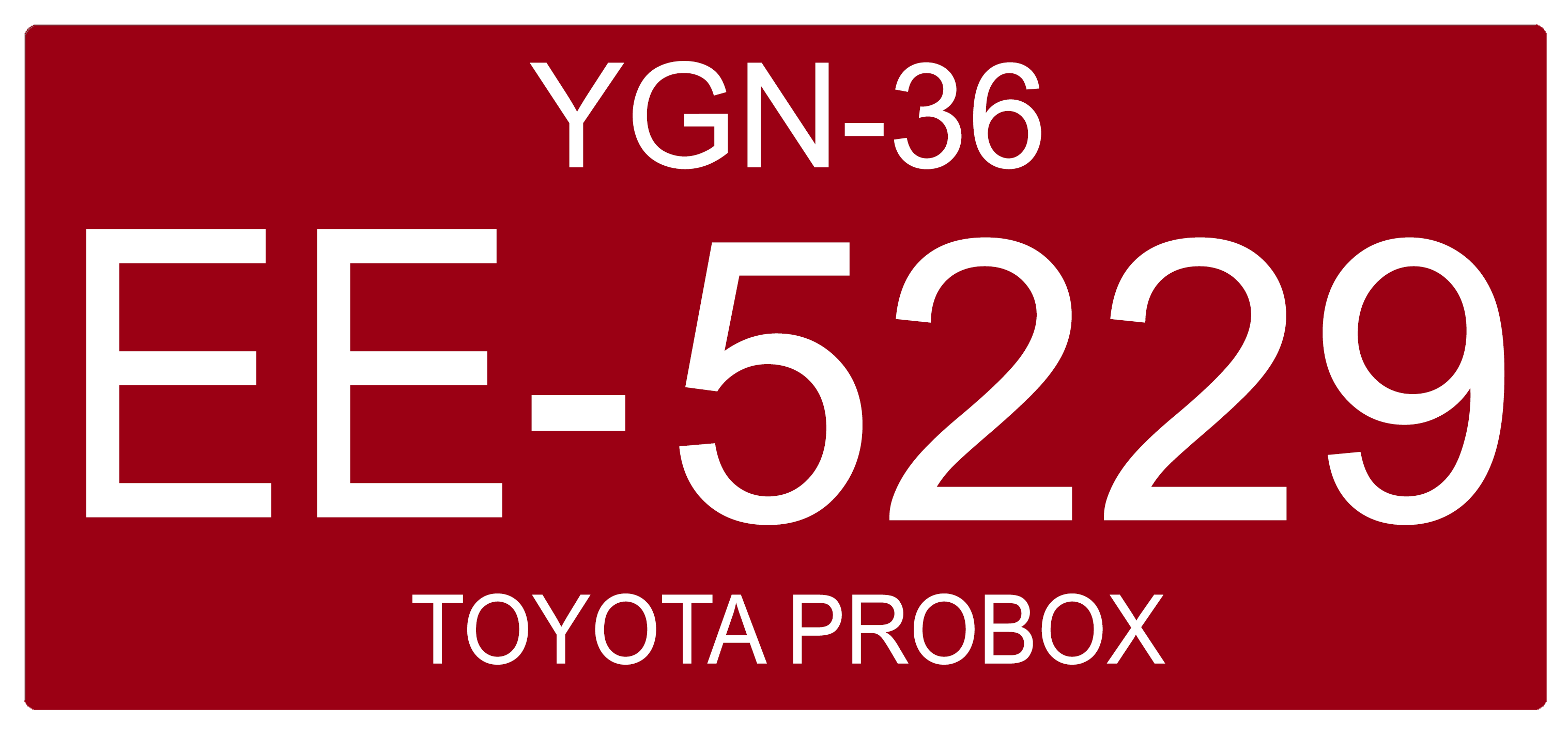
Taxi vehicle plate.

Initially registered with Burmese characters, the department began using Latin characters in September 2013. There are several types of license plates in Myanmar, colored differently depending on vehicle and service as shown in the table below:

Vehicle type	Background colour	Text colour
Embassies, Organisations	White	Black
Religious	Yellow	Black
Touring	Blue	White
Private	Black	White
Hire Vehicles, Trailers	Red	White
Volunteer Service	Green	White
Hearse	Red	White

== Regional codes ==
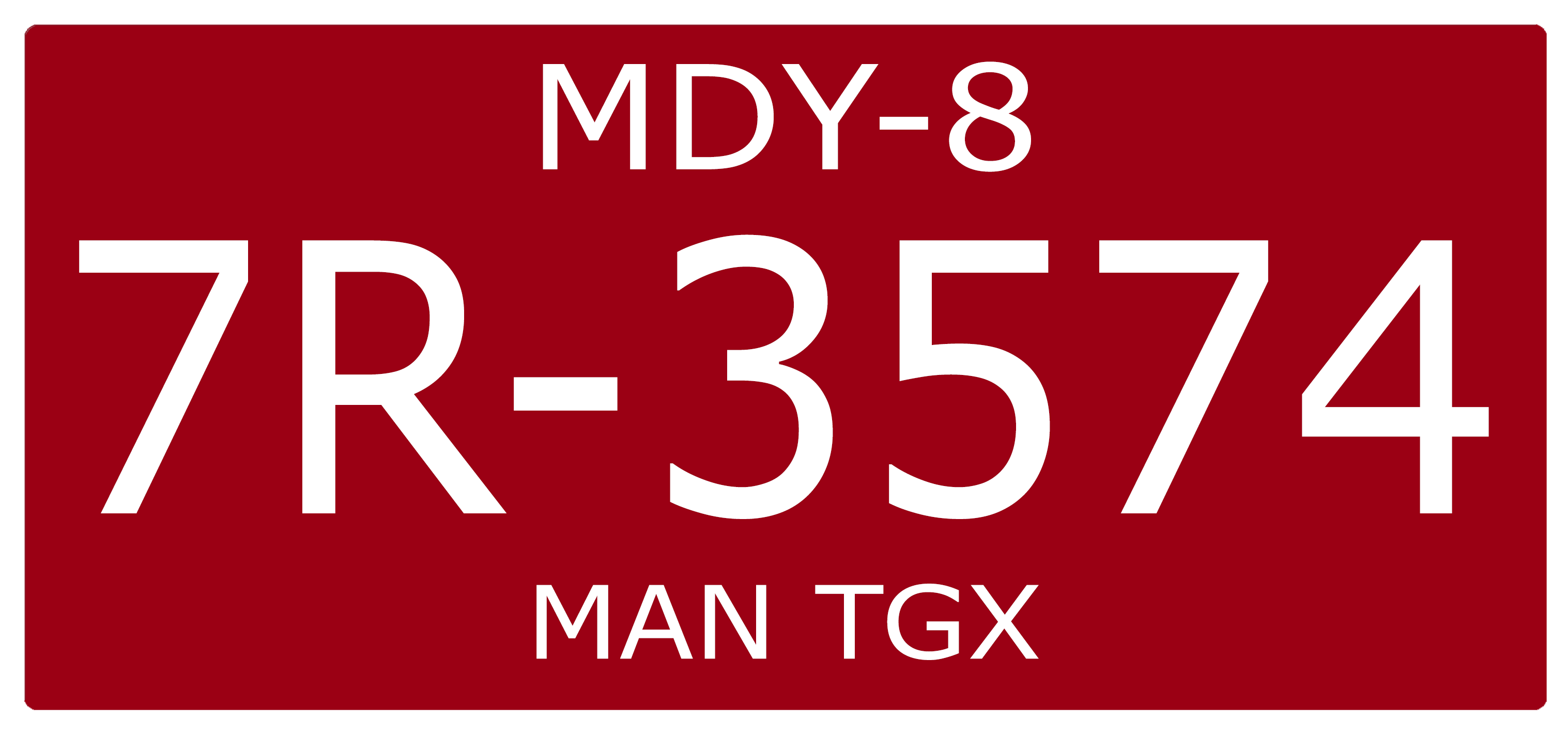
Truck, Hire vehicle plate.

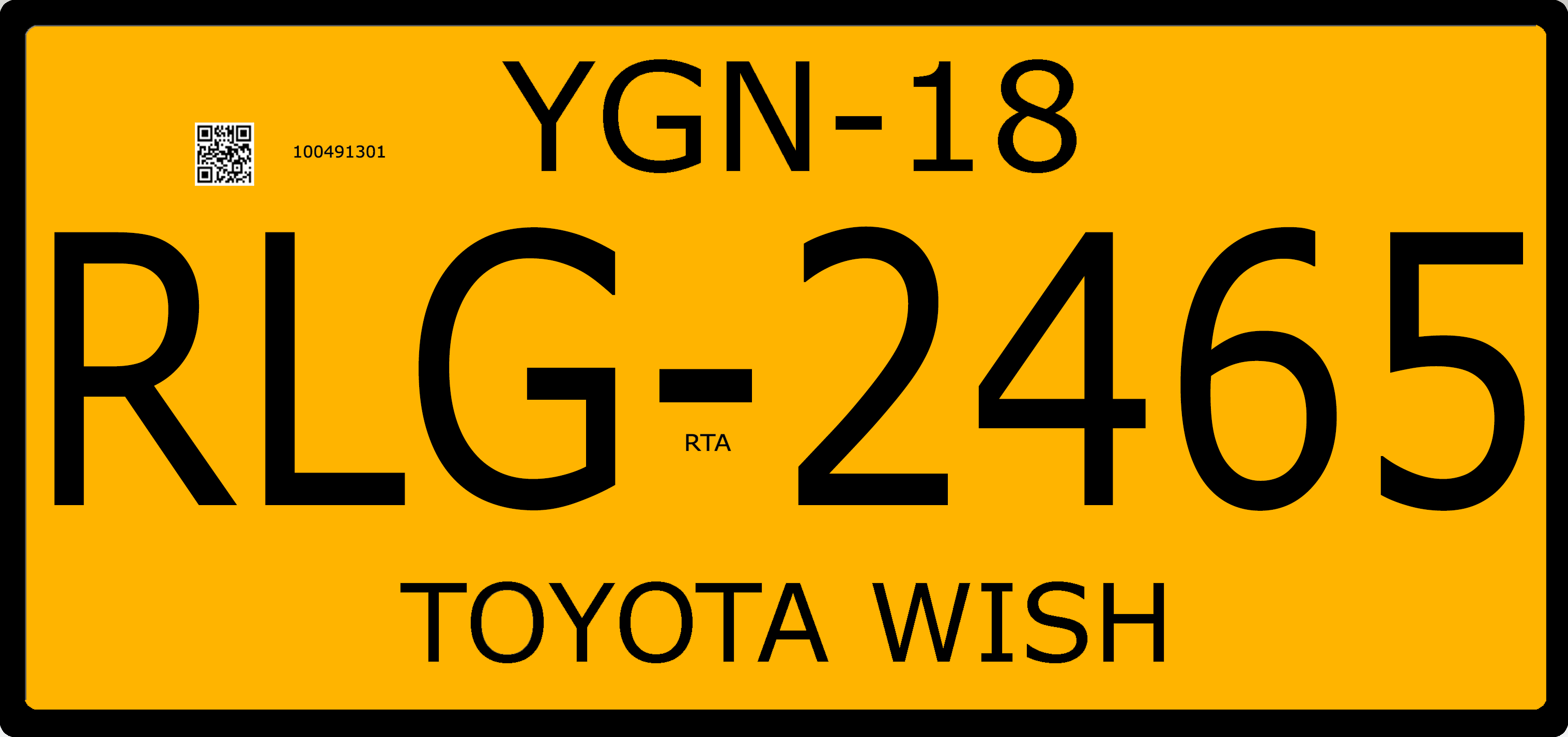
Religious vehicle plate.

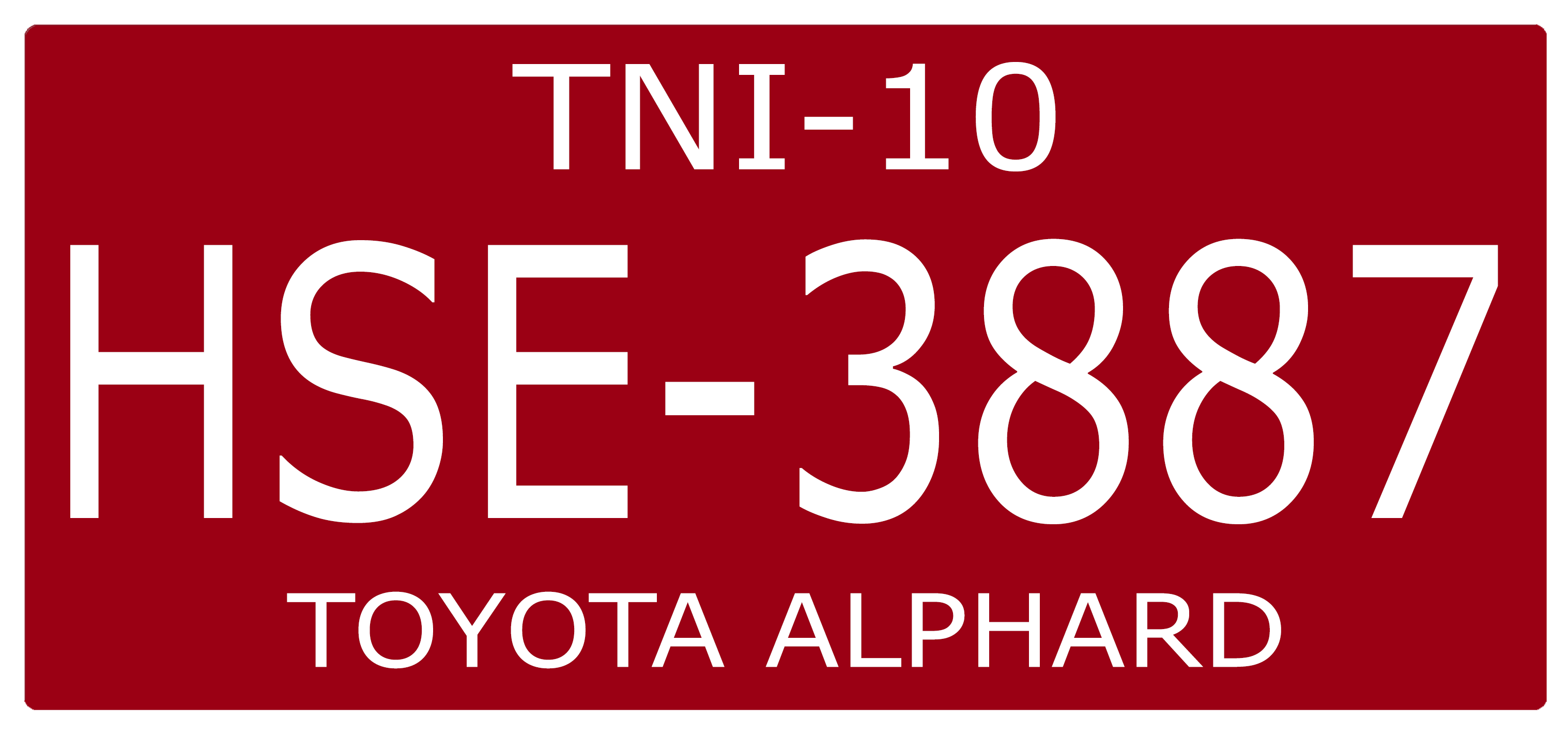
Hearse vehicle plate.

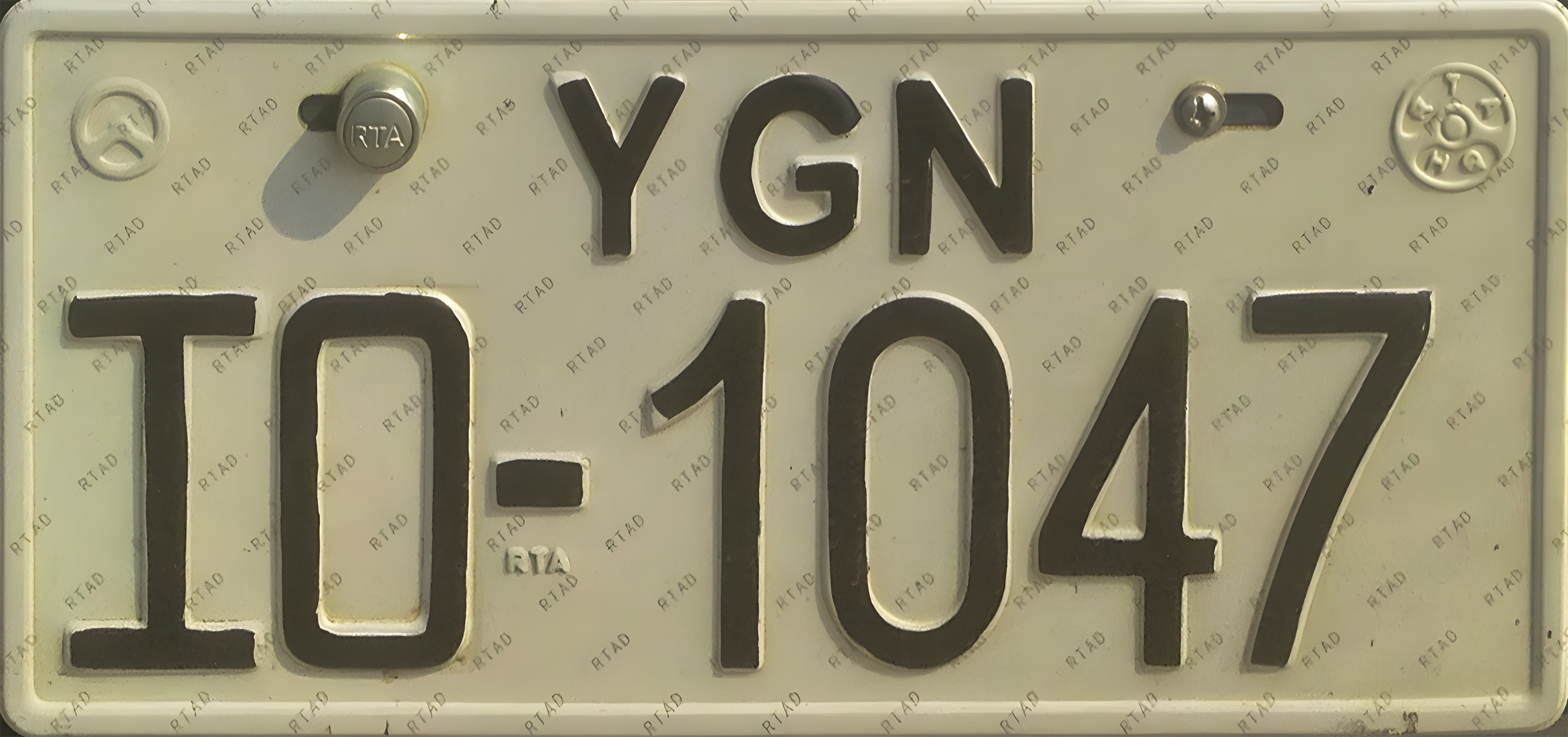
A Non-UN international organisations vehicle plate.

State/Region	Code	Township numeral	Example
Ayeyarwady	AYY	1–26	AYY-5 (Pathein)
Bago	BGO	1–28	BGO-2 (Taungoo)
Chin	CHN	1–9	CHN-9 (Hakha)
Kayah	KYH	1–7	KYH-7 (Loikaw)
Kachin	KCN	1–18	KCN-16 (Myitkyina)
Kayin	KYN	1–7	KYN-4 (Hpa-an)
Magway	MGY	1–25	MGY-12 (Magway)
Mandalay	MDY	1–28	MDY-18 (Amarapura)
Mon	MON	1–10	MON-4 (Mawlamyine)
Naypyitaw	NPW	1–8	NPW-1 (Zabuthiri)
Rakhine	RKE	1–17	RKE-5 (Sittwe)
Sagaing	SGG	1–37	SGG-28 (Monywa)
Shan	SHN	1–55	SHN-18 (Taunggyi)
Tanintharyi	TNI	1–10	TNI-3 (Dawei)
Yangon	YGN	1–45	YGN-13 (North Dagon)

== License plates ==
Example plates
Vehicle type	Current format	Older formats
Private	---YGN-36--- 3G-7224 SUZUKI ERTIGA	---YGN--- 1A-1234 ၁က/၁၂၃၄
Hire vehicle, truck	---YGN-12--- 1A-1234 NISSAN DIESEL	
Religious	---YGN-12--- RLG-1234 TOYOTA MARK II	---YGN--- RLG-1234
Vehicle from industrial zones	---YGN-12--- 8A-1234 I-ZONE	
Taxis	---YGN-12--- AA-1234 TOYOTA PROBOX	ကက/၁၂၃၄
Volunteer service	---YGN-12--- AA-1234 TOYOTA VITZ	
UN and its organizations	---YGN-12--- UN 12-34 BMW X5	UN 12-34 ဖွဲ့ ၁၂/၃၄
Embassies (diplomats)	---YGN-12--- CD 12-34 BMW X5	CD 12-34 သံ ၁၂/၃၄
Non-UN international organisations	---YGN-12--- IO-1234 HONDA FIT	
Touring vehicle	---YGN-12--- 1A-1234 SENOVA	
Hearse	---YGN-12--- HSE-1234 TOYOTA HIACE	---YGN--- HSE-1234
Tractor	---MDY--- 1A-12345	
Three-wheel motorcycle	MDY-18 U 1234	ဟ ၁၂၃၄၅
Motorcycle	MDY-10 W 12345	၂၃ ယ ၁၂၃၄၅

== Wa State ==
Wa State, an autonomous self-governing state located in the east of the country, has its own license plate design. The passenger license plates have two letters, a hyphen and four to six digits, and the first letter always starts with W. Dimensions and colors are the same as those in the rest of Myanmar.

== Gallery ==
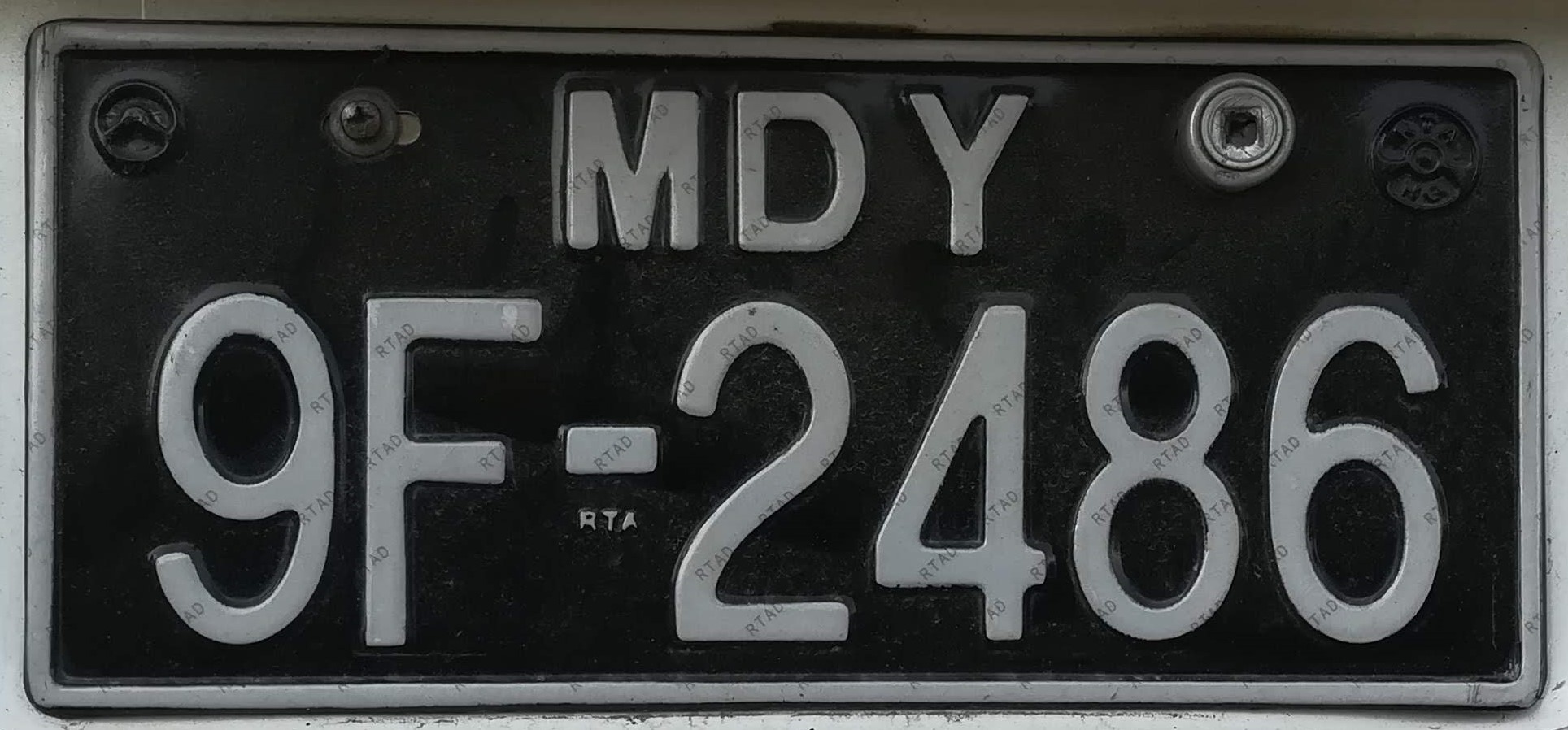
Private vehicle registration plate

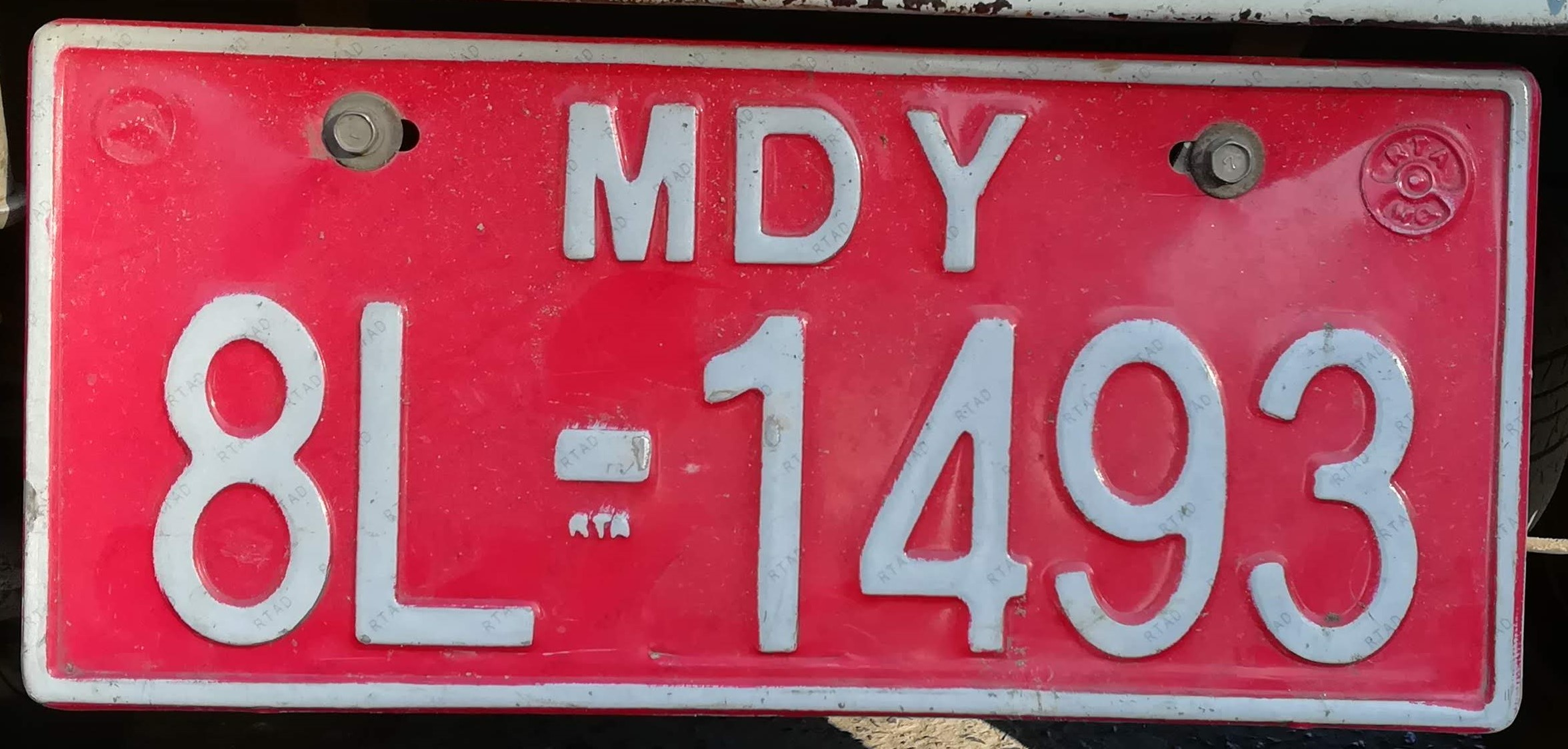
Commercial vehicle registration plate

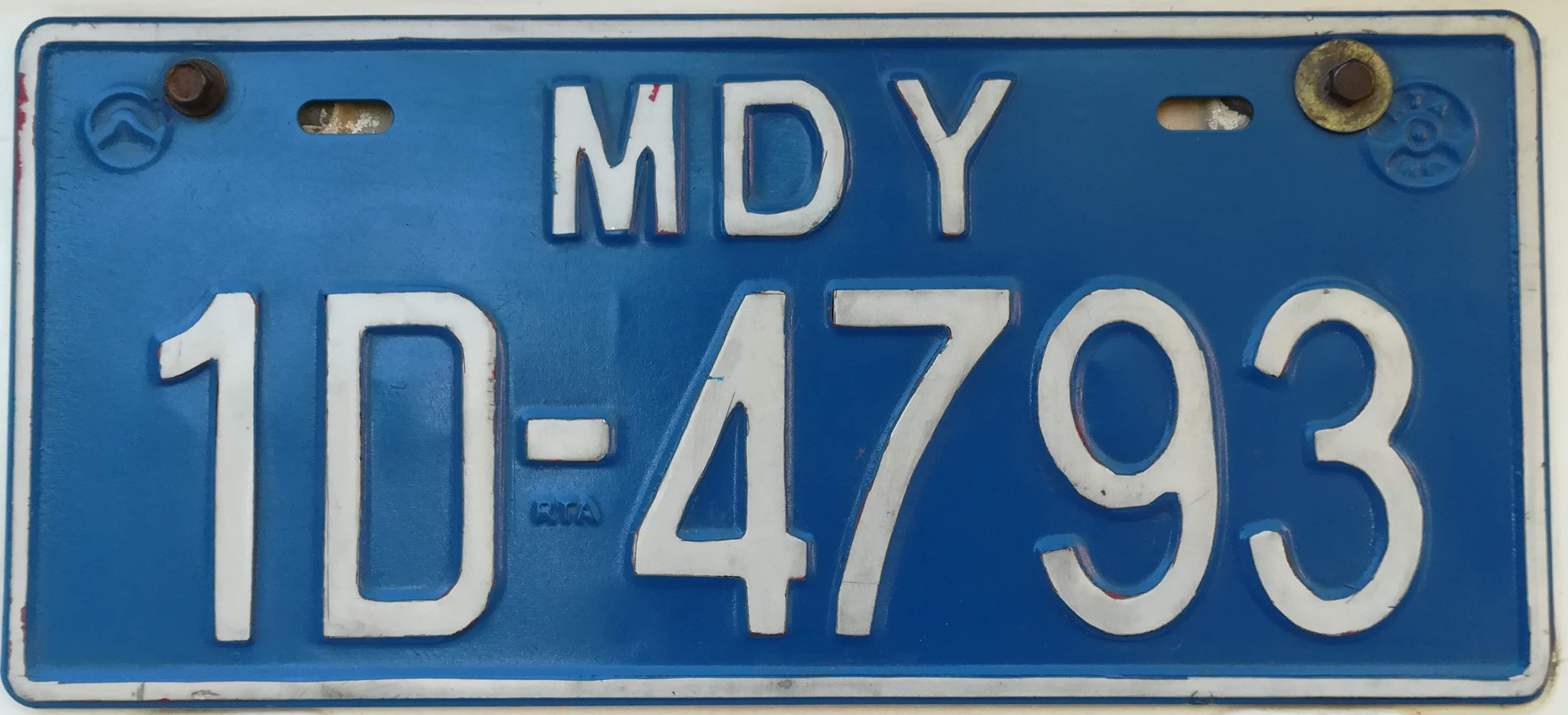
Touring vehicle registration plate

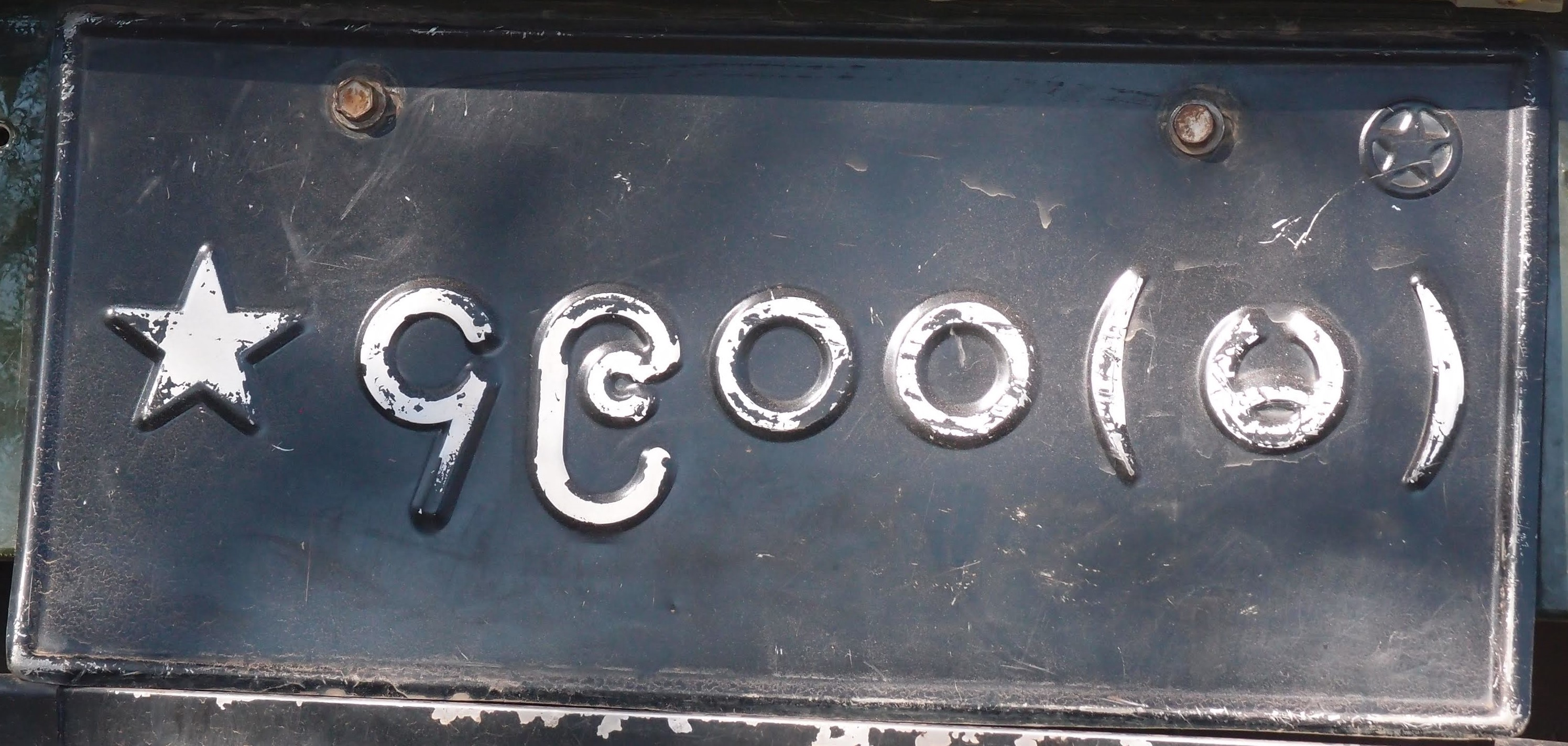
Army vehicle registration plate

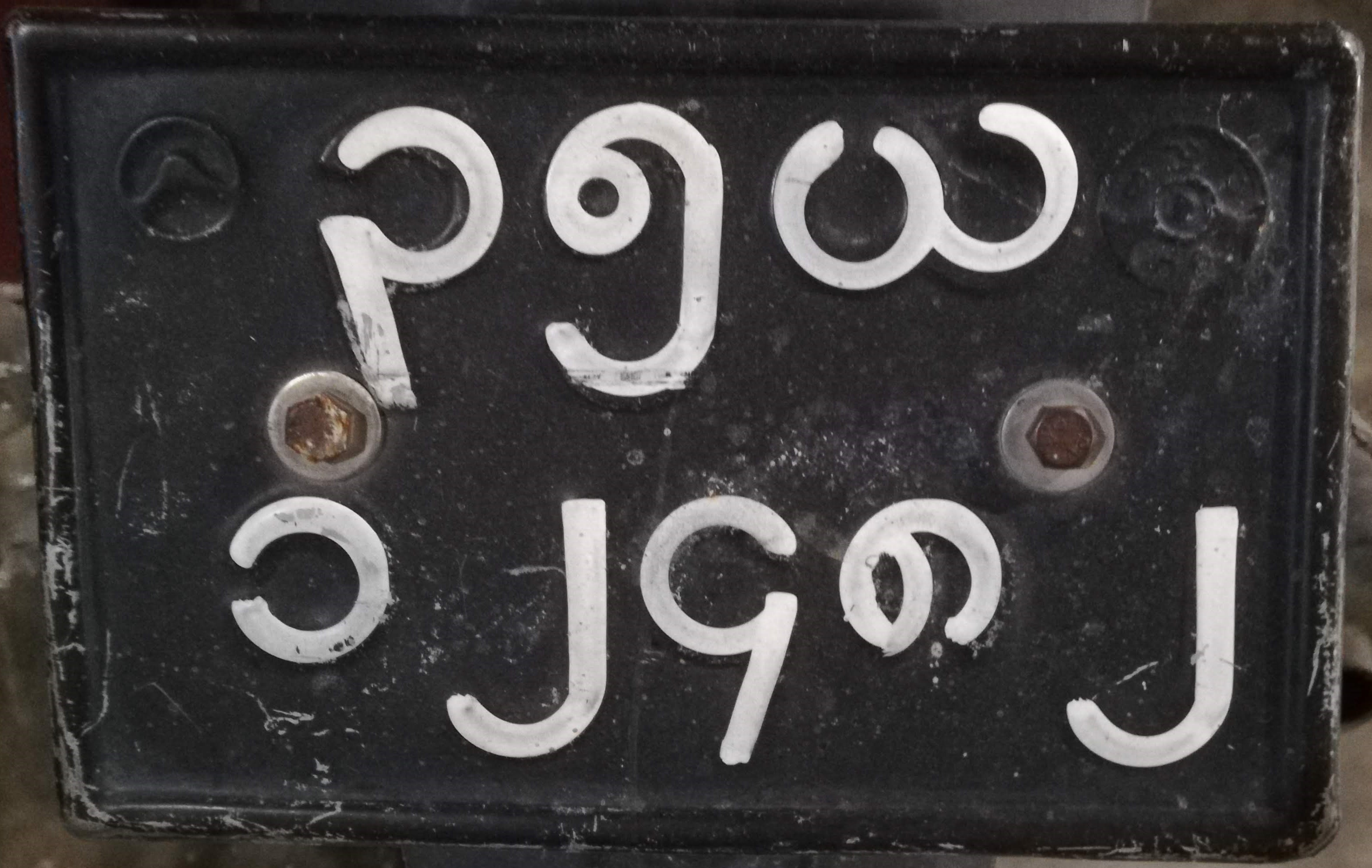
Motorcycle registration plate

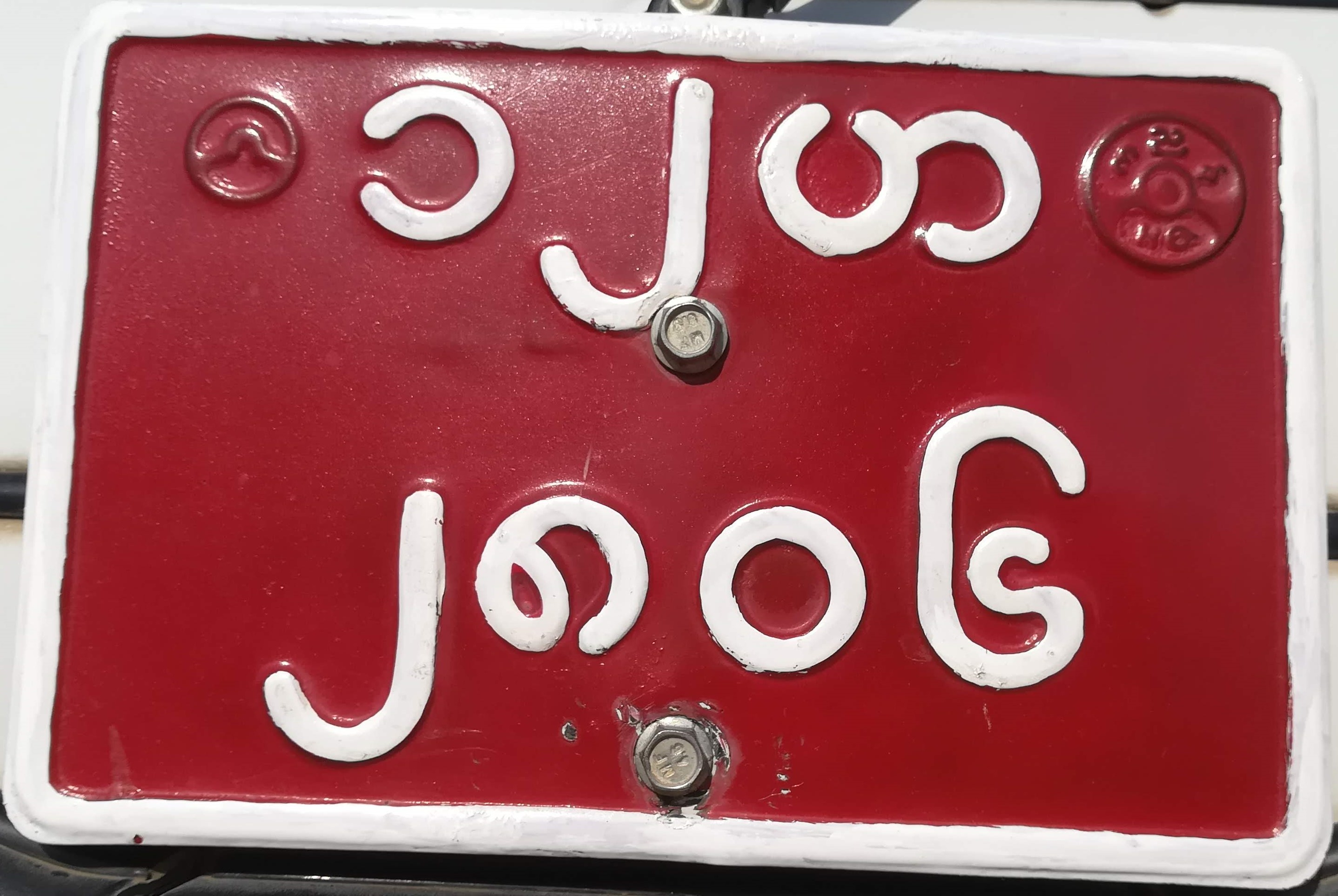
Rickshaw registration plate
