= Angoon Seaplane Base =

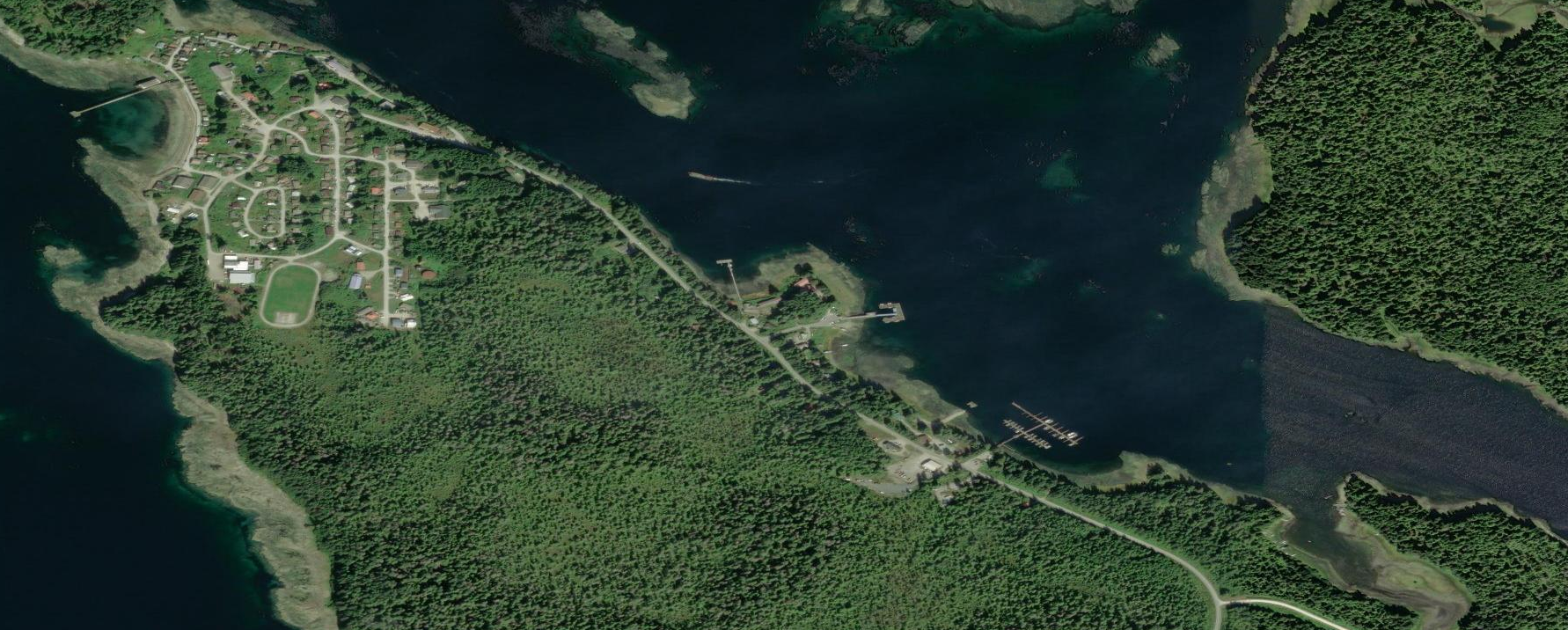
- IATA: AGN; ICAO: PAGN; FAA LID: AGN

Summary
- Airport type: Public
- Owner: State of Alaska DOT&PF - Southeast Region
- Serves: Angoon, Alaska
- Elevation AMSL: 0 ft (0 m)
- Coordinates: 57°30′13″N 134°35′06″W

Map
- Location of airport in Alaska

Runways
Direction	Length		Surface
Direction	ft	m	Surface
NW/SE	10,000	3,048	Water

Statistics (2015)
- Aircraft operations: 1,700
- Based aircraft: 0
- Passengers: 3,316
- Freight: 142,000 lbs
- Source: Federal Aviation Administration

Angoon Seaplane Base (IATA: AGN, ICAO: PAGN, FAA LID: AGN) is a state-owned public-use seaplane base located one nautical mile (2 km) southeast of the central business district of Angoon, a city on Admiralty Island in the Hoonah-Angoon Census Area of the U.S. state of Alaska. Scheduled airline service is subsidized by the Essential Air Service program.

As per the Federal Aviation Administration, this airport had 1,770 passenger enplanements (boardings) in calendar year 2008, 1,750 in 2009, and 1,680 in 2010. The National Plan of Integrated Airport Systems for 2015–2019 categorized it as a general aviation airport, based on 1,743 enplanements in 2012 (the commercial service category requires at least 2,500 enplanements per year).

== Facilities and aircraft ==
Angoon Seaplane Base has one seaplane landing area designated NW/SE which measures 10,000 by 900 feet (3,048 x 274 m). For the 12-month period ending December 31, 2006, the airport had 1,150 aircraft operations, an average of 95 per month: 87% air taxi and 13% general aviation.

== Airlines and destinations ==
The following airline offers scheduled passenger service:

Airlines	Destinations
Alaska Seaplanes	Juneau

== Statistics ==
Carrier shares: January – December 2015
Carrier	Passengers (arriving and departing)
Alaska Seaplanes	3,320(100%)

Top domestic destinations: January – December 2015
Rank	City	Airport name & IATA code	Passengers
1	Juneau, AK	Juneau International Airport (JNU)	1,770
2	Tenakee, AK	Tenakee Airport (TKE)	20

== See also ==
- List of airports in Alaska
- Tenakee Seaplane Base (57°46′47″N 135°13′06″W)

== Other sources ==
- Essential Air Service documents (Docket DOT-OST-2006-25542) from the U.S. Department of Transportation:
  - 90-Day Notice (August 1, 2006): of Alaska Juneau Aeronautics, Inc. d/b/a Wings of Alaska of intent to terminate Essential Air Service at Angoon and Tenakee, Alaska.
  - Order 2006-9-17 (September 19, 2006): allowing Alaska Juneau Aeronautics, Inc., d/b/a Wings of Alaska, to suspend its unsubsidized scheduled service at Angoon and Tenakee, Alaska, on September 23, 2006.
  - 90-Day Notice (October 6, 2008): of Alaska Seaplane Service, LLC to terminate all scheduled service at Angoon and Tenakee, Alaska.
  - Order 2008-12-27 (December 29, 2008): selecting Alaska Seaplane Service, LLC, to provide essential air service (EAS) at annual subsidy rate of $101,359 at Angoon and $63,748 at Tenakee, Alaska, through January 31, 2011.
  - Order 2010-12-7 (December 3, 2010): reselected Alaska Seaplane Service, LLC, to provide essential air service (EAS) at Angoon and Tenakee, Alaska, at annual subsidy rates of $145,734 at Angoon and $135,576 at Tenakee, from February 1, 2011, through January 31, 2015.
  - Order 2011-3-18 (March 15, 2011): amends the payout formula for Angoon and Tenakee.
