= Zakouma Airport =

- IATA: AKM; ICAO: none

Summary
- Airport type: Public
- Operator: Government
- Serves: Zakouma, Chad
- Location: Salamat Region
- Elevation AMSL: 415 m (1,362 ft)
- Coordinates: 10°53′27″N 019°49′03″E

Map
- Location within Chad

Runways
Direction	Length		Surface
Direction	m	ft	Surface
03/21	1,500	4,921	Clay
- Source: AIS ASECNA

Zakouma Airport (IATA: AKM) is an airport located in the Salamat region in Chad. It serves the Zakouma National Park.

== Facilities ==
The airport is at an elevation of 415 metres (1,362 ft) above mean sea level. It has one runway designated 03/21 with a clay surface measuring 1,500 by 37 metres (4,921 ft × 121 ft).
