= Advanced Digital Corporation =

Defunct American computer company

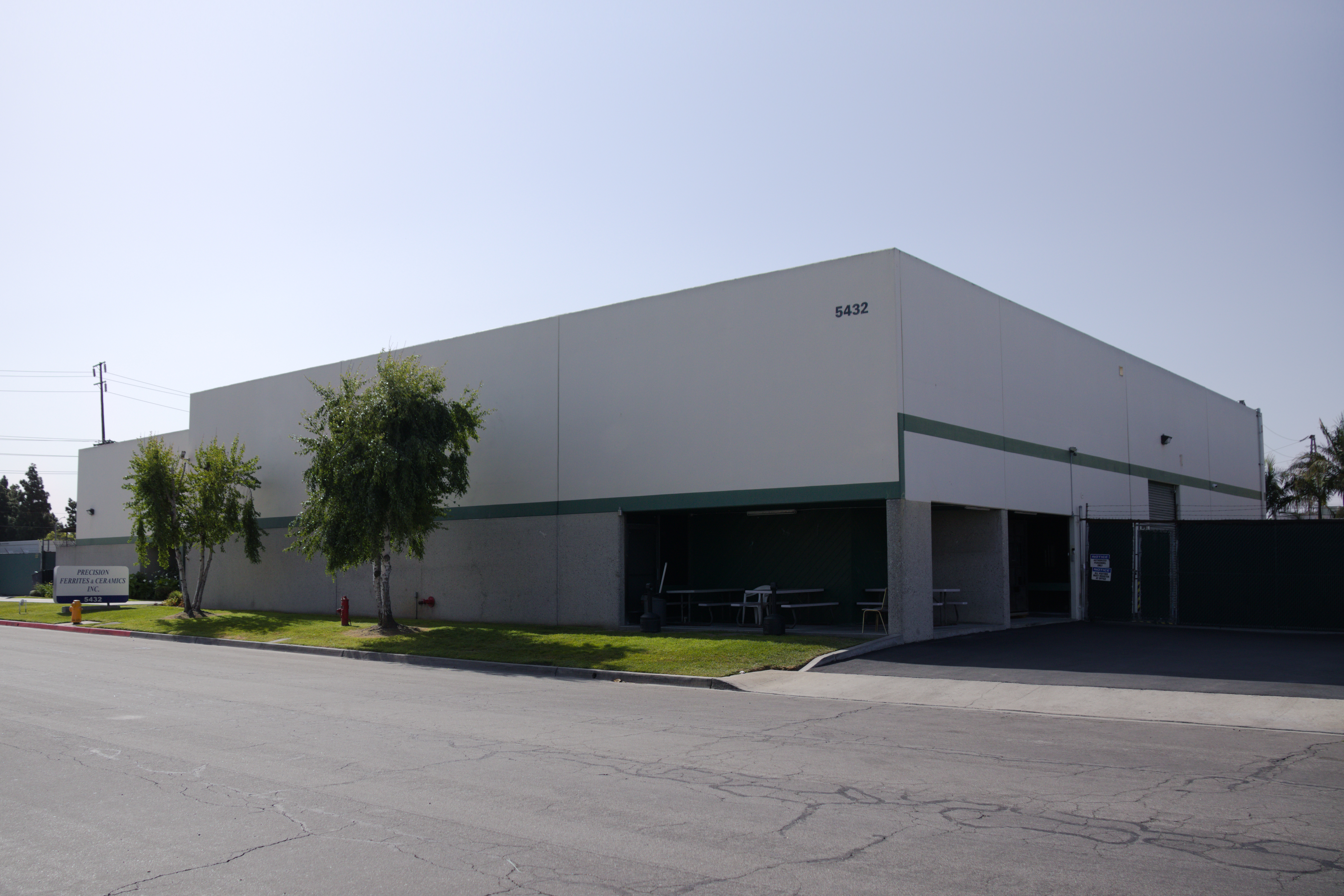
- Site of former headquarters in Huntington Beach, California, pictured in 2022
- Trade name: ADC
- Type: Private
- Founded: 1980; 46 years ago in Garden Grove, California
- Fate: Acquired. In 1990, the company was acquired by Advanced Interlink, an IBM PC-related products company, for an undisclosed sum reported at $10 million. Asadi remained with the company briefly following the acquisition before departing to found Cybernet Manufacturing."
- Headquarters: Huntington Beach, California (1983–1990)
- Key people: Hossein Asadi (president)
- Products: Computer hardware and systems

Advanced Digital Corporation (ADC) was a privately owned American computer company based in California, active from the 1980s to the 1990s. The company was founded by 1980 by a group of engineers, in order to market their single-user and multi-user expansion cards and peripherals for S-100–based computers.

In 1983, ADC introduced a pair of their own S-100 computers, the Super Six and the Super Star. In 1984, they made the pivot to production of expansion cards for the IBM Personal Computer, with one (the PC II, co-produced by Link Technologies of Fremont) allowing the IBM PC to be used as a multi-user platform, with as many as 32 concurrent users. Toward the late 1980s, they introduced their own 386SX-based PC compatible systems under the PowerLite name, to critical acclaim in the tech press. ADC was initially based in Garden Grove, California, employing 35 by mid-1983. In late 1983, they moved to Huntington Beach. By April 1984, their employee headcount reached 75. Its president was Hossein Asadi.
