= Angoche Airport =

- IATA: ANO; ICAO: FQAG

Summary
- Airport type: Public
- Serves: Angoche, Mozambique
- Elevation AMSL: 36 m / 118 ft
- Coordinates: 16°10′55″S 039°56′41″E

Map
- Location of the airport in Mozambique

Runways
Direction	Length		Surface
Direction	m	ft	Surface
01/36	1,100	3,610
07/25	815	2,675
13/31	600	1,970
- Sources: GCM

Angoche Airport (IATA: ANO, ICAO: FQAG) is an airport serving Angoche, a city of Nampula Province in Mozambique.

== Facilities ==
The airport resides at an elevation of 118 feet (36 m) above mean sea level. It has three runways, the longest of which is 1,100 metres (3,609 ft).
