= Aseki Airport =

Airport in Aseki, Morobe, Papua New Guinea

- IATA: AEK; ICAO: AYAX

Summary
- Location: Aseki, Papua New Guinea
- Coordinates: 7°21′2.8975″S 146°11′37.9202″E

Map
- Location of the airport in Papua New Guinea

Runways
Direction	Length		Surface
Direction	ft	m	Surface
16/34	1,969	600	Grassed red silt clay

Aseki Airport (IATA: AEK, ICAO: AYAX) is an airport in Aseki, Papua New Guinea.
