= Ayapel Airport =

- IATA: AYA; ICAO: none

Summary
- Airport type: Public
- Serves: Ayapel, Colombia
- Elevation AMSL: 120 ft / 37 m
- Coordinates: 08°18′00″N 075°09′00″W

Map

Ayapel Airport (IATA: AYA) is an airport located in Ayapel, Colombia.
