= Afore Airstrip =

- IATA: AFR; ICAO: AYAF

Summary
- Location: Afore, Papua New Guinea
- Coordinates: 9°8′32″S 148°23′27″E

Map
- Location of the airport in Papua New Guinea

Runways
Direction	Length		Surface
Direction	ft	m	Surface
03/21	2,073	632	Grassed brown silt clay

Afore Airstrip (IATA: AFR, ICAO: AYAF) is an airstrip in Afore, Papua New Guinea.
