= Ar Horqin Airport =

Ar Horqin Airport 阿鲁科尔沁机场
- IATA: AEQ; ICAO: none

Summary
- Airport type: Public
- Serves: Ar Horqin Banner, Inner Mongolia, China
- Location: Tianshan Town
- Coordinates: 43.87042°N 120.15958°E

Map
- Location of the airport AEQ (China)

Ar Horqin Airport (Chinese: 阿鲁科尔沁机场) (IATA: AEQ) is a general aviation airport being constructed to serve Ar Horqin Banner in Chifeng, Inner Mongolia, China. It is located 8 kilometres (5.0 mi) northeast of Tianshan Town, the administrative seat of Ar Horqin, between the villages of Shenglong and Shuangshan.

The airport project was approved in 2015, and construction began in April 2016. A test flight was successfully conducted on 30 May 2018. The airport is rated class A1, capable of handling aircraft with up to 30 seats such as the Cessna 208B and the Harbin Y-12.
