= Andes Airport =

- IATA: ADN; ICAO: SKAN

Summary
- Location: Andes, Colombia
- Elevation AMSL: 3,900 ft / 1,189 m
- Coordinates: 5°41′51.504″N 75°52′49.368″W

Map

Andes Airport (IATA: ADN, ICAO: SKAN) is an airport in Andes, Colombia.
