= Nanima Kariba Rural LLG =

Local-level government in Papua New Guinea

Nanima Kariba Rural LLG Aseki Rural LLG
- Location within Papua New Guinea
- Coordinates: 7.35062°S 146.19138°E
- Country: Papua New Guinea
- Province: Morobe Province
- Time zone: UTC+10 (AEST)

Nanima Kariba Rural LLG (formerly Aseki Rural LLG) is a local-level government (LLG) of Morobe Province, Papua New Guinea.

== Wards ==
- 02. Oiwa
- 15. Haukini
- 17. Wangini
- 18. Bainu
- 19. Poiyu
- 21. Aseki Station
- 24. Damnga
- 25. Pakea
- 26. Yangaiyu
- 27. Wapa
- 28. Tawa Station
- 29. Yeva
- 30. Kokea
- 31. Wingia
