= Atkamba Airport =

Airport in Western, Papua New Guinea

- IATA: ABP; ICAO: none

Summary
- Location: Atkamba, Papua New Guinea
- Elevation AMSL: 150 ft (46 m)
- Coordinates: 06°04′00″S 141°06′00″E
- Interactive map of Atkamba Airport

Runways
Direction	Length		Surface
Direction	m	ft	Surface
17/35	519	1,703
- Source: PNG Airstrip Guide

Atkamba Airport (IATA: ABP) is an airport serving Atkamba, in the Western Province of Papua New Guinea.
