= Kagua Airport =

- IATA: AGK; ICAO: none

Summary
- Serves: Kagua, Southern Highlands Province, Papua New Guinea
- Coordinates: 6°23′47″S 143°51′13″E
- Interactive map of Kagua Airport

Kagua Airport (IATA: AGK) is airfield serving Kagua, Papua New Guinea. It seems that Ansett Airlines of Papua New Guinea served this airfield in the past.
