= Andakombe Airport =

Airport in Papua New Guinea

- IATA: ADC; ICAO: AYAN

Summary
- Location: Andakombe, Papua New Guinea
- Elevation AMSL: 10 ft / 3 m
- Coordinates: 7°8′13.7″S 145°44′40.99″E

Map
- Location of airport in Papua New Guinea

Runways
Direction	Length		Surface
Direction	ft	m	Surface
	2,500	762

Andakombe Airport (IATA: ADC, ICAO: AYAN) is an airport in Andakombe, Papua New Guinea.
