= Thandwe =

Thandwe သံတွဲမြို့
- Town
- Thandwe
- Location within Myanmar
- Coordinates: 18°27′54.41″N 94°21′59.54″E
- Country: Myanmar
- State: Rakhine State
- Township: Thandwe
- Town: Thandwe
- Founder: Vāsudeva(legendary)

Area
  - Town: 3,522.798 km^{2} (1,360.160 sq mi)

Population (2014)
  - Town: 133,484
  - Density: 37.8915/km^{2} (98.1385/sq mi)
  - Urban: 14,327
- Time zone: UTC6:30 (MST)
- Postal code: 0717x
- Calling code: 4365

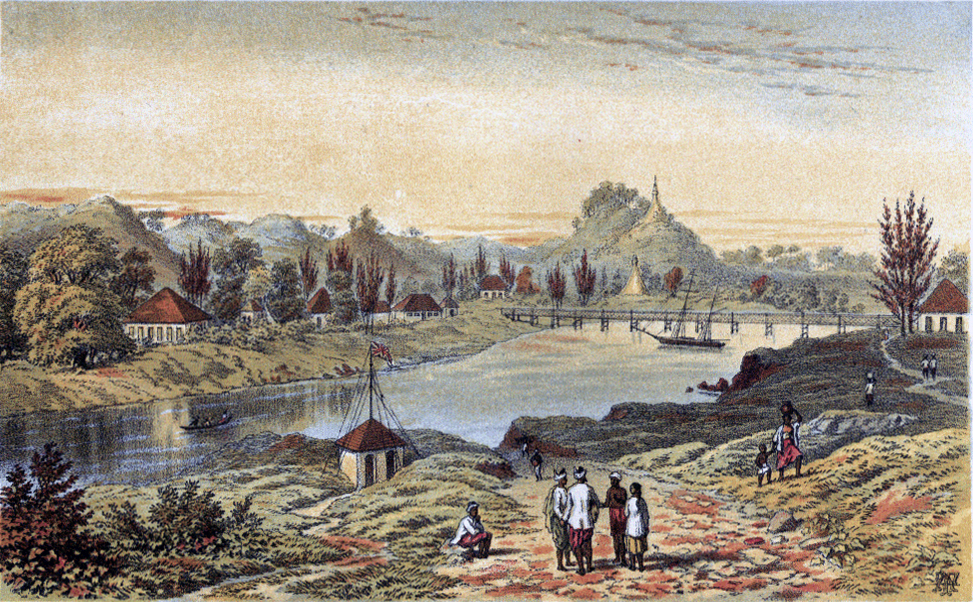
Artist rendition of Sandoway in the late 1800s

Thandwe ("Thandway" in Arakanese; Burmese: သံတွဲမြို့, MLCTS: samtwai: mrui. [θàɰ̃dwɛ́ mjo̰]; formerly Sandoway), with classical name being called Dvaravatī, is a town and major seaport in Rakhine State, the westernmost part of Myanmar.

== Recent history ==
During the ongoing Myanmar civil war, the town was the site of clashes between the Arakan Army and Myanmar's military, with the Arakan Army taking control of Ngapali Beach and several military outposts surrounding the town. According to reports, the Arakan Army seized the town's prison on 15 July 2024, with the town's remaining military battalions falling the next day and giving the Arakan Army full control of the town.

== Geography ==
Thandwe is very ancient, and is said to have been at one time the capital of Rakhine State, then called Arakan. The district has an area of 3,784 square miles (9,800 km^{2}). The area is mountainous, and spurs of the Arakan Mountains reach the coast. Some of the peaks in the north are over 4,000 feet (1,200 m) high. The streams are only mountain torrents to within a few miles of the coast; the mouth of the Khwa forms a good anchorage for small boats. The rocks in the Arakan Range and its spurs are metamorphic, and include clay, slates, ironstone and indurated sandstone; towards the south, ironstone, trap and rocks of basaltic character are common; veins of steatite and white fibrous quartz are also found. Nearby Ngapali Beach is popular among tourists.

=== Climate ===
Thandwe has a tropical monsoon climate (Köppen Am). Temperatures are very warm throughout the year. There is a winter dry season (November–April) and a summer wet season (May–October). Torrential rain falls from June to September, with over 1,200 millimetres (47 in) falling in each of the months of June, July and August. Between 1991 and 2020, the mean annual rainfall was 5,384 millimetres (212.0 in). The rainfall in 1905 was 230.49 inches (5,854 mm).

Climate data for Thandwe (1991–2020, extremes 1978–1994)
Month	Jan	Feb	Mar	Apr	May	Jun	Jul	Aug	Sep	Oct	Nov	Dec	Year
Record high °C (°F)	37.2 (99.0)	35.0 (95.0)	37.8 (100.0)	37.2 (99.0)	37.8 (100.0)	37.2 (99.0)	32.8 (91.0)	32.8 (91.0)	35.0 (95.0)	33.9 (93.0)	36.1 (97.0)	32.8 (91.0)	37.8 (100.0)
Mean daily maximum °C (°F)	31.0 (87.8)	32.7 (90.9)	34.0 (93.2)	35.2 (95.4)	34.2 (93.6)	30.8 (87.4)	29.9 (85.8)	29.9 (85.8)	31.6 (88.9)	33.4 (92.1)	33.1 (91.6)	31.8 (89.2)	32.3 (90.1)
Daily mean °C (°F)	21.9 (71.4)	23.2 (73.8)	26.1 (79.0)	28.9 (84.0)	29.3 (84.7)	27.3 (81.1)	26.8 (80.2)	26.7 (80.1)	27.5 (81.5)	28.2 (82.8)	26.5 (79.7)	23.6 (74.5)	26.3 (79.3)
Mean daily minimum °C (°F)	12.9 (55.2)	13.8 (56.8)	18.2 (64.8)	22.7 (72.9)	24.4 (75.9)	23.9 (75.0)	23.6 (74.5)	23.5 (74.3)	23.5 (74.3)	23.0 (73.4)	20.0 (68.0)	15.5 (59.9)	20.4 (68.7)
Record low °C (°F)	7.2 (45.0)	7.2 (45.0)	10.0 (50.0)	16.1 (61.0)	20.0 (68.0)	20.0 (68.0)	17.8 (64.0)	20.0 (68.0)	20.0 (68.0)	18.9 (66.0)	12.2 (54.0)	8.3 (46.9)	7.2 (45.0)
Average rainfall mm (inches)	7.5 (0.30)	6.2 (0.24)	3.6 (0.14)	17.1 (0.67)	354.2 (13.94)	1,254.4 (49.39)	1,521.5 (59.90)	1,348.4 (53.09)	627.6 (24.71)	192.1 (7.56)	40.3 (1.59)	10.8 (0.43)	5,383.7 (211.96)
Average rainy days (≥ 1.0 mm)	0.4	0.3	0.5	1.8	11.3	22.9	25.3	23.6	18.4	11.5	2.8	0.4	119.1
Source 1: World Meteorological Organization
Source 2: Sistema de Clasificación Bioclimática Mundial (records)
