= Aungban =

Aungban အောင်ပန်းမြို့
- Town
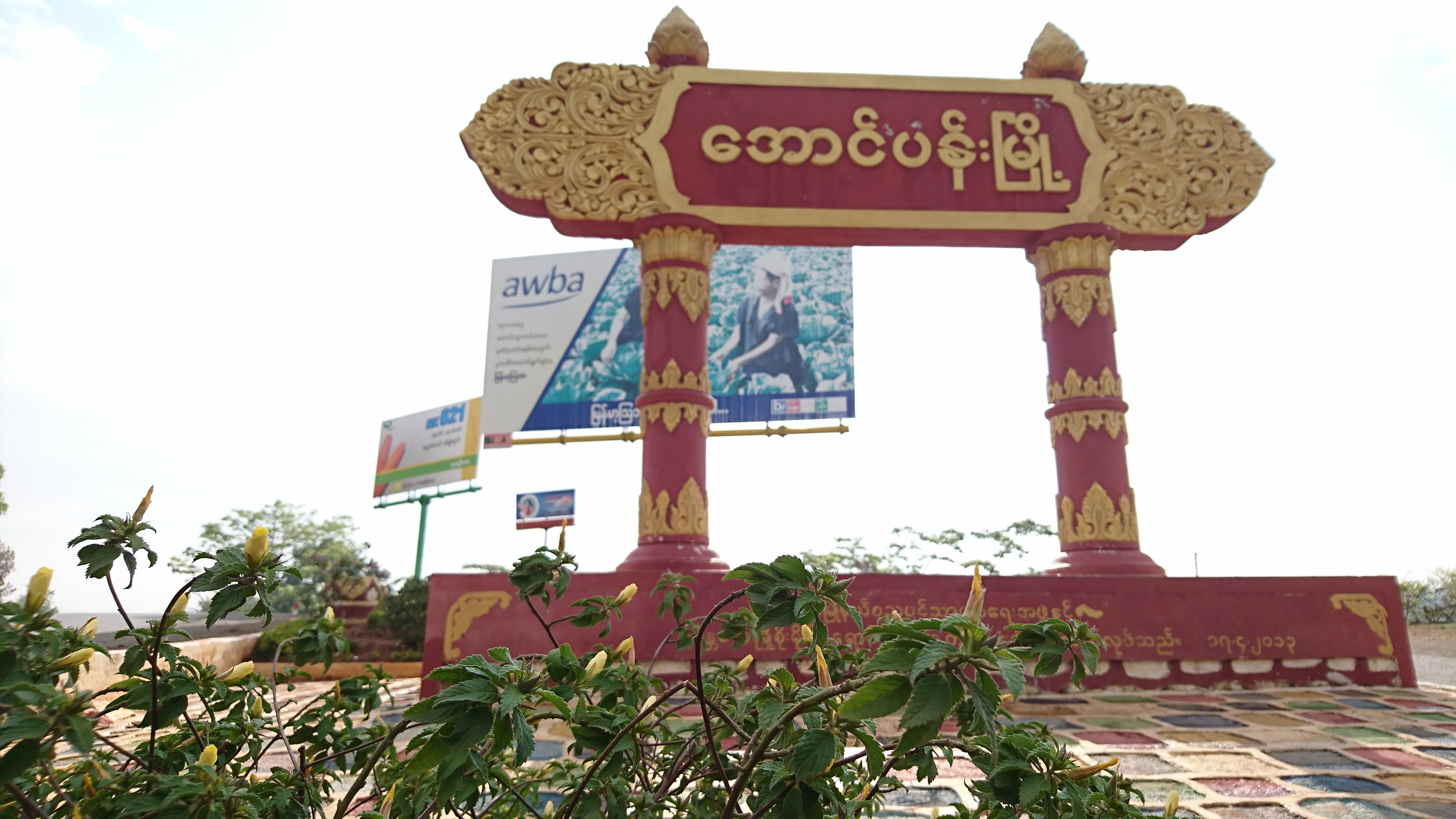
- A view of Aungban

- Location of Aungban, Myanmar Aungban (Asia)
- Coordinates: 20°40′0″N 96°38′0″E
- Country: Myanmar
- State: Shan State
- Districts: Kalaw District
- Township: Kalaw Township
- Founded: 17-April-1913
- Incorporated: 30-August-1973

Area
  - Total: 2.4 sq mi (6.2 km^{2})
- Elevation: 4,219 ft (1,286 m)

Population (September 2018)
  - Total: 30,515
  - Rank: 49th in Myanmar
  - Density: 13,000/sq mi (4,900/km^{2})
  - Ethnic groups: List of ethnicities: Bamar (49.23%); Danu (22.66%); Pa-O (13.44%); Taungyo (5.89%); Shan (1.25%); Intha (1.13%); Kayin (0.22%); Mon (0.17%); Rakhine (0.14%); Chin (0.11%); Kayah (0.04)%; Dawei (0.04%); Kachin (0.03%); Burmese Chinese; Burmese Indians; Burmese Gurkha
  - Religions: List of religions: Theravada Buddhism (96.2%); Islam (2.53%); Christianity (1.12%); Hinduism (0.15%)
- Demonym: Aungbanese
- Time zone: UTC+6.30 (MST)
- Postal code: 06022
- Area code: 081, 082
- Vehicle registration: SHN
- Climate: Humid subtropical (Cwa)

Aungban (Burmese: အောင်ပန်းမြို့) (Pa'o Karen: ဝေင်ꩻအောင်ႏဗန်း) is a major trading town in the southern Shan State of Myanmar that supplies agricultural yield to the rest of the country. It is located in Kalaw Township which is part of Kalaw District. It lies on the Thazi-Kyaingtong road at an elevation of 4,219 feet (1,286 m) above sea level.

As of September 2019, its recorded population was 30,515. Due to its location in agricultural villages, it is considered a junction town. The majority of agricultural products, mainly potato, garlic, ginger, cabbage, tomato, cauliflower, avocado, orange, and tea-leaves, are collected from nearby towns and villages by traders and distributed to other parts of the country, especially Yangon, Mandalay, Naypyitaw, Nyaung U, Tachileik, Kayin and Mon.

== Overview ==
As Aungban is considered a trading hub within the surrounding region, more than half a dozen banks operate there. Owing to its logistic importance, some of the largest companies in Myanmar's agricultural value chain have set up branch offices in Aungban, which has created many employment opportunities for the local populace.

The town also plays a strategic role in Myanmar's military operations, as the town houses an army base. A military hospital with a 700-bed capacity began operating in the 2000s, providing healthcare service not only to military personnel, but also to the wider public. A small lake in Bahtoo Park, Aungban, named Mingalar Lake, began as a collection of drain water discharged from living quarters. Renovation and restoration work carried out by the chairman of KBZ Bank transformed the site, and now it functions as a recreational area for residents.

== Geography ==
The town covers an area of 2.4 square miles (1,500 acres) and includes 12 wards. It is situated on a rolling plain and there are no high ranges of hills except those found towards the western part of the town. The average elevation of the town lies between 4,000 and 4,500 feet. The highest mountain peaks can be found on the northwest of the town. About one-third of the town area is considered lowland.

== Climate ==
Aungban

Climate chart (precipitation, max. and min. temperature)
J	F	M	A	M	J	J	A	S	O	N	D
3 22 7	5 23 8	13 27 12	50 29 16	205 27 17	244 25 17	274 24 17	293 24 18	259 25 17	209 24 16	84 23 12	15 21 8
- █ Average max. and min. temperatures in °C
- █ Precipitation totals in mm
- Source: Aungban Climate Data
Imperial conversion
J	F	M	A	M	J	J	A	S	O	N	D
0.1 71 44	0.2 74 46	0.5 81 53	2 85 61	8.1 80 63	9.6 76 63	11 75 63	12 75 64	10 76 63	8.2 76 60	3.3 73 53	0.6 70 47
- █ Average max. and min. temperatures in °F
- █ Precipitation totals in inches

Aungban has a monsoon-influenced humid subtropical climate (Cwa), closely bordering a subtropical highland climate (Cwb) according to the Köppen climate classification system. The area displays the classic dry winter – hot summer pattern associated with tropical monsoonal climates.

The town has three seasons: the hot, dry inter-monsoonal season (mid-February to mid-May), the rainy southwest monsoon season (mid-May to late October), and the cool, relatively dry northeast monsoon season (late October to mid-February).

The weather is usually warm and temperate. When compared with winter, the summers have much more rainfall.

The average annual temperature in Aungban is 19.1 °C (66.4 °F). The warmest month of the year is April, with an average temperature of 22.7 °C (72.9 °F).

At 14.2 °C (57.6 °F) on average, January is the coldest month of the year. The variation in annual temperature is around 8.5 °C (15.3 °F).

The yearly rainfall is 1,654 mm (65.1 in). The difference in precipitation between the driest month and the wettest month is 290 mm (11 in).

Climate data for Aungban (1982–2012)
Month	Jan	Feb	Mar	Apr	May	Jun	Jul	Aug	Sep	Oct	Nov	Dec	Year
Mean daily maximum °C (°F)	21.7 (71.1)	23.3 (73.9)	27.3 (81.1)	29.3 (84.7)	26.8 (80.2)	24.7 (76.5)	24.1 (75.4)	24 (75)	24.7 (76.5)	24.3 (75.7)	22.6 (72.7)	20.9 (69.6)	24.5 (76.1)
Mean daily minimum °C (°F)	6.8 (44.2)	7.6 (45.7)	11.9 (53.4)	16.1 (61.0)	17 (63)	17.4 (63.3)	17.4 (63.3)	17.6 (63.7)	17.1 (62.8)	15.6 (60.1)	11.7 (53.1)	8.2 (46.8)	13.7 (56.7)
Average rainfall mm (inches)	3 (0.1)	5 (0.2)	13 (0.5)	50 (2.0)	205 (8.1)	244 (9.6)	274 (10.8)	293 (11.5)	259 (10.2)	209 (8.2)	84 (3.3)	15 (0.6)	1,654 (65.1)
Average rainy days	1	0.2	8	14	27	21	30	29	24	24	2	3	183.2
Average relative humidity (%)	64	44	38	50	72	86	91	93	90	87	85	70	72.5
Mean monthly sunshine hours	231	255	316	375	357	247	190	178	188	229	209	231	3,006
Mean daily sunshine hours	7	8	10	12	12	9	8	8	9	8	7	7	8.75
Average ultraviolet index	4	5	6	6	6	6	4	6	5	5	4	5	5.2
Source 1: Aungban Monthly Climate Averages
Source 2: Norwegian Meteorological Institute

== Transportation ==
The town is located on the Union Highway, making it directly accessible by highway buses coming from both Upper and Lower Myanmar. It plays a major role as a junction town, lying slightly east of Heho by about 14 miles (23 km), where roads branch off south to Loikaw, Kayah State, north to the temples of Pindaya at about 25 miles (40 km) and west to Kalaw at 6 miles (9.7 km).

=== Air ===
In the 1920s, the single-line railway was extended from Aungban to Shwenyaung, allowing Heho, a small village of Danu people, to grow into a town. An airport was later built 4 km (2.5 mi) northwest of the town. The airport served as an airbase both for the Allies and the Japanese during World War II, and was bombed by the Allies during the war. Evidence of aircraft bunker revetments and bomb craters, especially noticeable from the air, can still be seen on the southern end of the airfield. Myanmar National Airlines and Air KBZ offer direct flights from Yangon to Heho daily, with prices starting at MMK 66,000 and an estimated travel time of 1 hour and 10 minutes.

=== Railway ===
The Aungban-Loikaw railroad was constructed in 1992. The Working People's Daily newspaper reported in 1992 that over 300,000 people had contributed 'voluntary labor' for the Aungban-Loikaw railway line connecting the states of Shan and Kayah. By the end of the project one year later, the total number had risen to almost 800,000. However, many independent and credible testimonies have indicated that this labor was not 'voluntary', and was in fact forced.

=== Road ===
In recent times, the motorway passing through Aungban has been expanded to include four lanes, and buildings that fell under the Union Highway zone were demolished. This motorway upgrade was completed in April 2020.

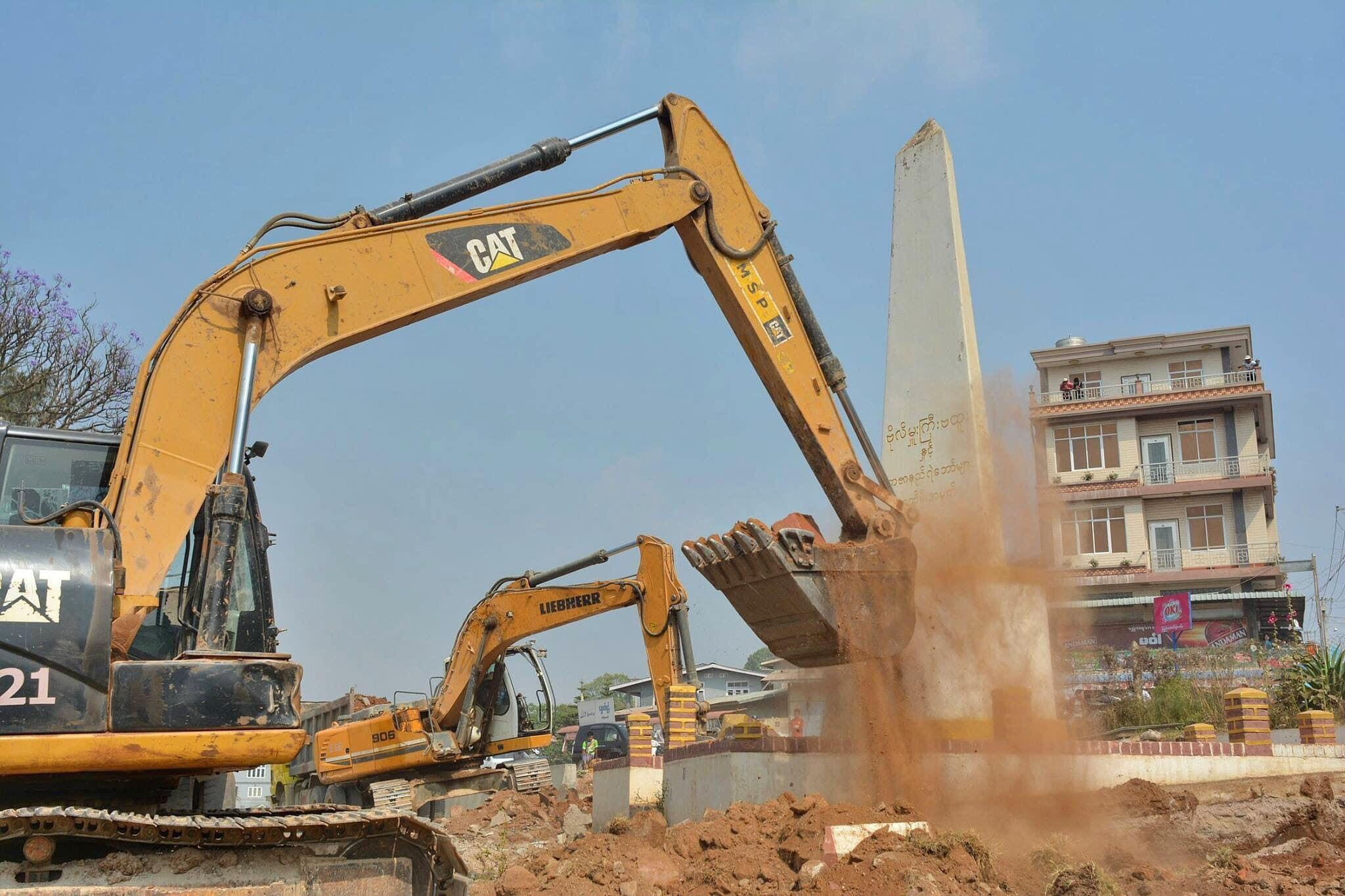
Demolishing of Colonel Ba Htoo Monument (March 2019)

A decision to demolish Colonel Ba Htoo's Memorial Monument on 28 March 2019 was reached after consultation by a committee consisting of the state government officials, lawmakers, party representatives, and community elders from the town. The committee decided to construct a new monument near the original place. Colonel Ba Htoo (12 July 1916 – 2 June 1945) was a senior member of the Burma Independence Army, and best known for his leadership in the battle against the Japanese forces in Upper Myanmar while General Aung San commanded the resistance in Lower Myanmar.

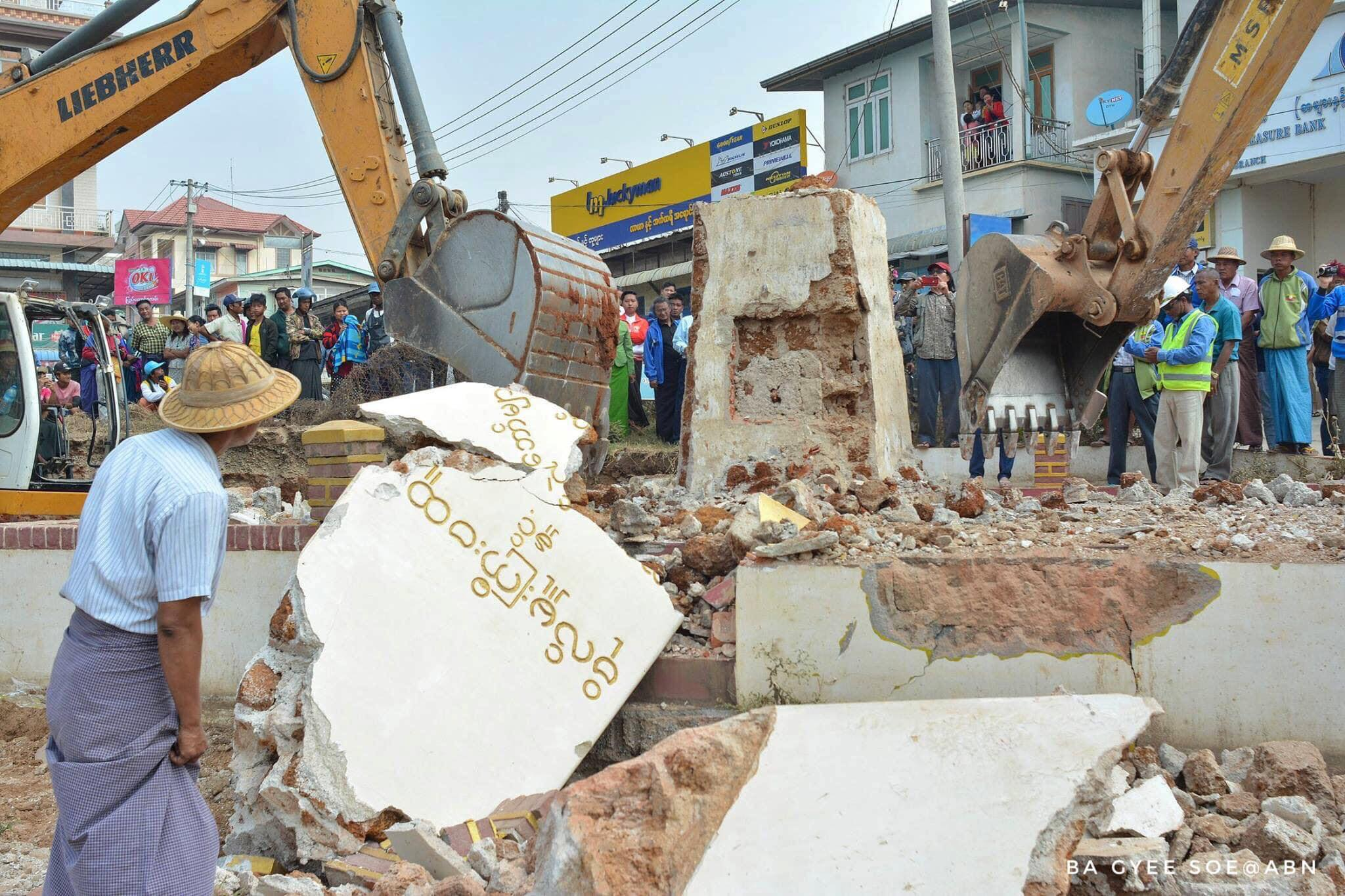
Town's committee finding the urn of Colonel Ba Htoo (March 2019)

As Major Ba Htoo and his company drove the Japanese troops out from Mandalay into southern Shan State, he contracted a severe case of malaria. He died from malaria in Te Lu village (Burmese: တဲ့လုကျေးရွာ), Ywangan Township, Shan State on 2 June 1945, at the age of just twenty-nine years old. He died without seeing the letter informing him that General Aung San had promoted him to colonel, and without saying goodbye to his wife and three children, from whom he had been parted since he joined the army in 1942.

In addition to the monument, some residential homes, banks, and other buildings have also been removed to widen the Union Highway. According to the reliable sources, the original Monument was opened on 15 June 1945 in honor of Colonel Ba Htoo. The demolished column had been built over the original monument by Assistant Township Officer U Thein Hlaing in the transition period from Aungban township to Kalaw township on 1 October 1965. Controversial and criticisms arose around the country for complete demolishment without considering for relocation.

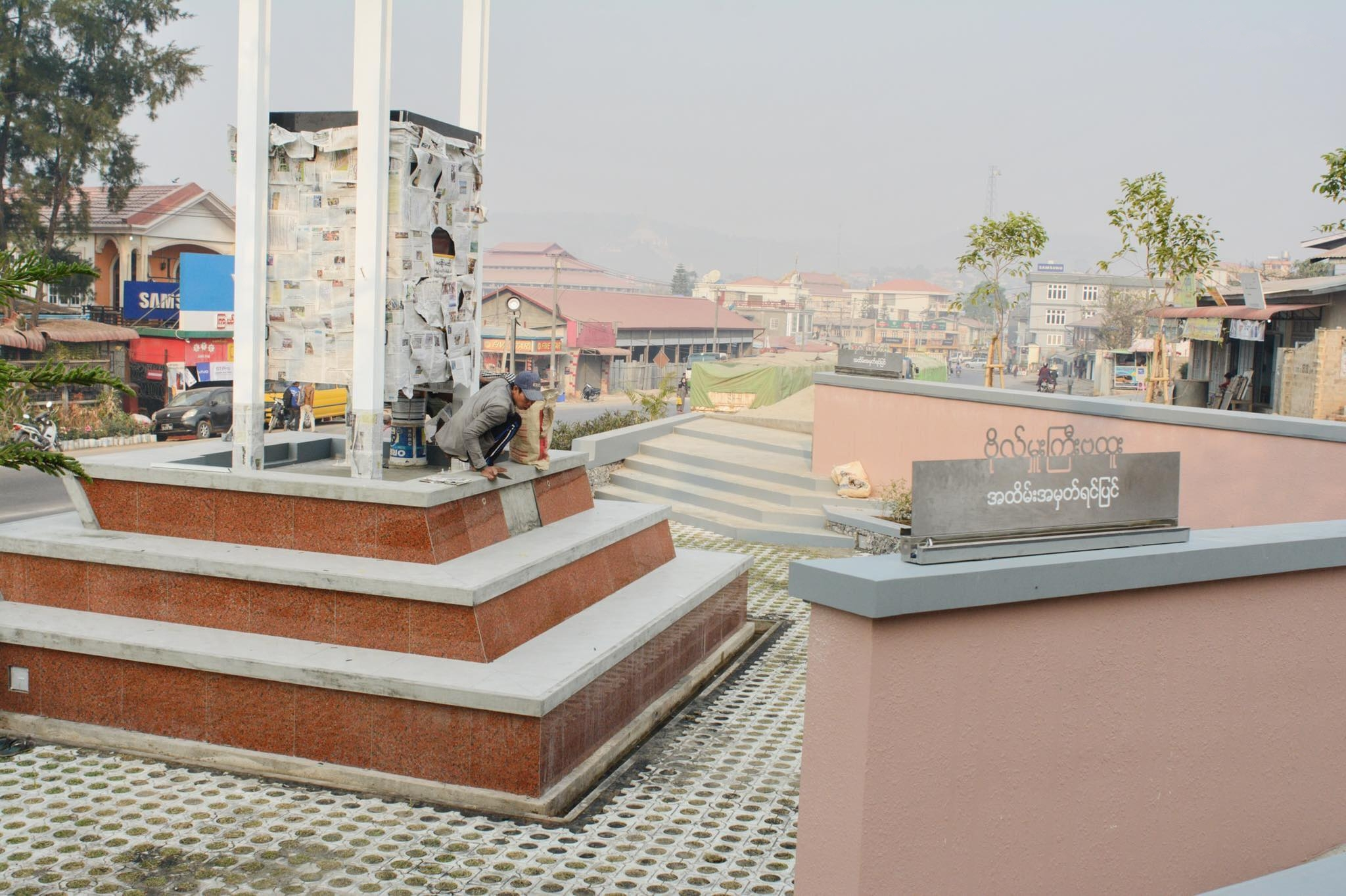
The New Monument under construction (March 2020)

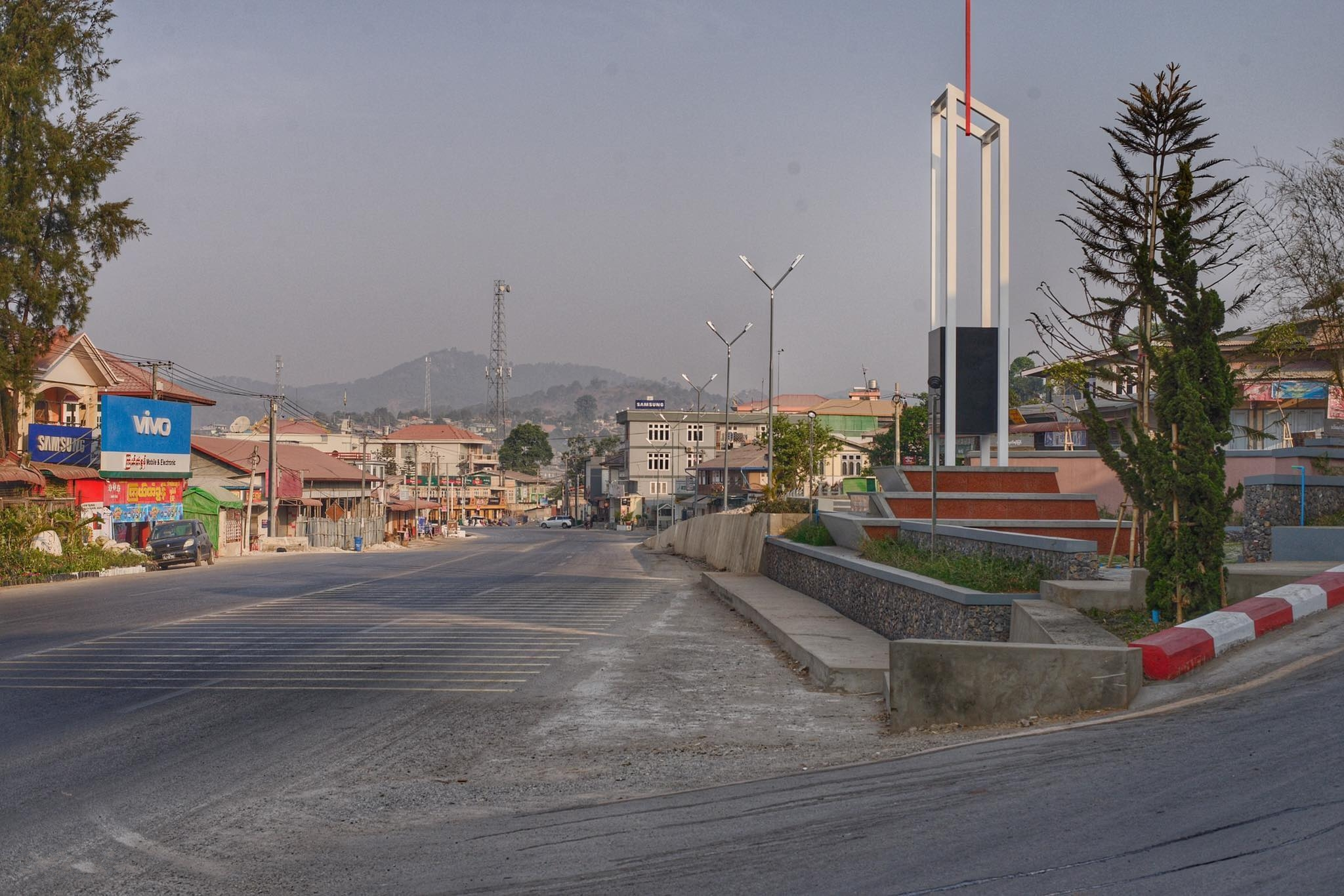
Colonel Ba Htoo Memorial Monument (April 2020)

The committee agreed that the urn holding the colonel's ashes would be retrieved and placed inside the new monument. Nonetheless, the urn had not been located upon further digging inside the monument, indicating that the real urn of Colonel Ba Htoo is inside the monument located in Te Lu village (Burmese: တဲ့လုကျေးရွာ) of Ywangan Township, Shan State.

The construction of the monument was completed and to be opened on 27 March 2020. However, the opening ceremony was canceled due to the COVID-19 pandemic.

The town's 100-year-anniversary clock-tower at the Pindaya junction was also removed.

== Demographics ==
As of September 2018, the estimated population of the town was recorded to be 30,515; about 68% of which were children below the age of 18. The total residential household of the town was reported to be 6,256. The male population of the town was 48.3%, and the female population 51.7%. The report also showed that the town has a small percentage of resident foreigners; 3.71% from India, 1.24% from China, 1.05% from Nepal, 0.92% from Pakistan and 0.11% from Bangladesh.

=== Ethnicity ===
The same census also reported that about 49% of the residents were Bamar, 23% Danu, 13% Pa-O, 6% Taungyo, 1% Shan and Intha. The remaining 7% include Burmese Chinese, Burmese Indians and Gurkha.

Ethnicities of Aungban– 2018 September
Ethnic group	Percentage
Bamar	49.23%
Danu	22.66%
Pa-O	13.44%
Taungyo	5.89%
Shan	1.25%
Intha	1.13%
Others	6.4%

=== Religion ===
Religions in Aungban (September 2018)
Religion	Percent
Buddhism	96.2%
Islam	2.53%
Christianity	1.12%
Hinduism	0.15%

The town's prevalent religion is Theravada Buddhism. According to the September 2018 report, 96.2% of the town's population self-identified as Buddhists.

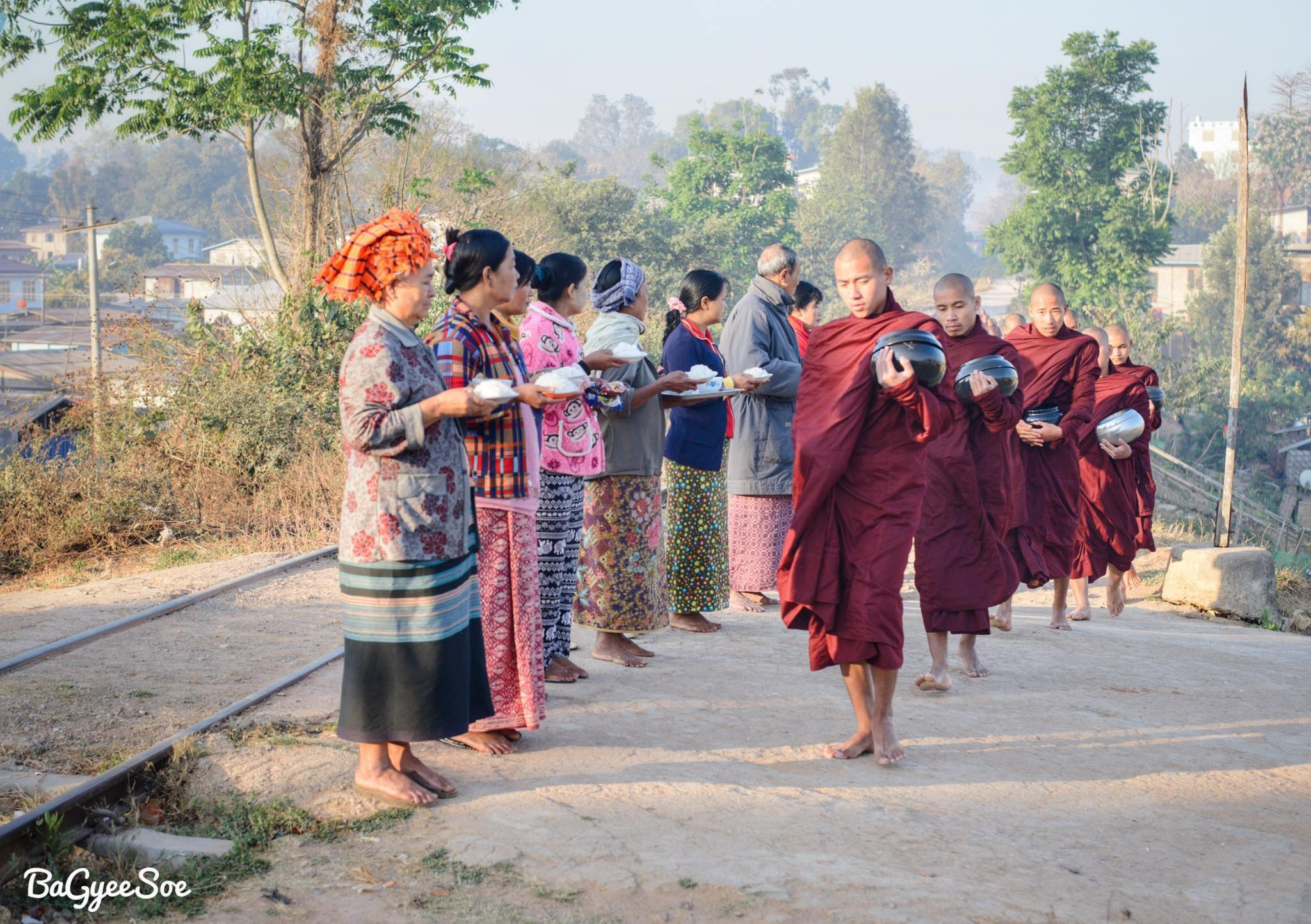
Locals offering food to monks (March 2020)

From the same report, 0.6% of the town's population were monks, 2% were samanera, and 0.04% were nuns. The town holds many Kyaung monasteries and every morning a lot of monks collecting alms bowls of food can be seen. The town is also home to many Chinese-descendant Buddhists who have established a Chinese temple. Muslims make up the second-largest religious group in the town, 2.53% of the town's population. Christians represent 1.12% of the town and a small community of Hindus make up 0.15%. There are Catholic churches, Baptist churches, Hindu temples, and mosques in Aungban.

=== Food ===
Various types of Shan traditional food such as Shan tofu (ရှမ်းတိုဟူး), Shan noodle, Hin Htoke (a steamed mixture of rice powder and spring onion wrapped in banana leaf), Khaw Pote (made from black glutinous rice) and fried tofu-curd or salad are sold as street food. Chinese, Thai and Myanmar cuisine are available at most restaurants.

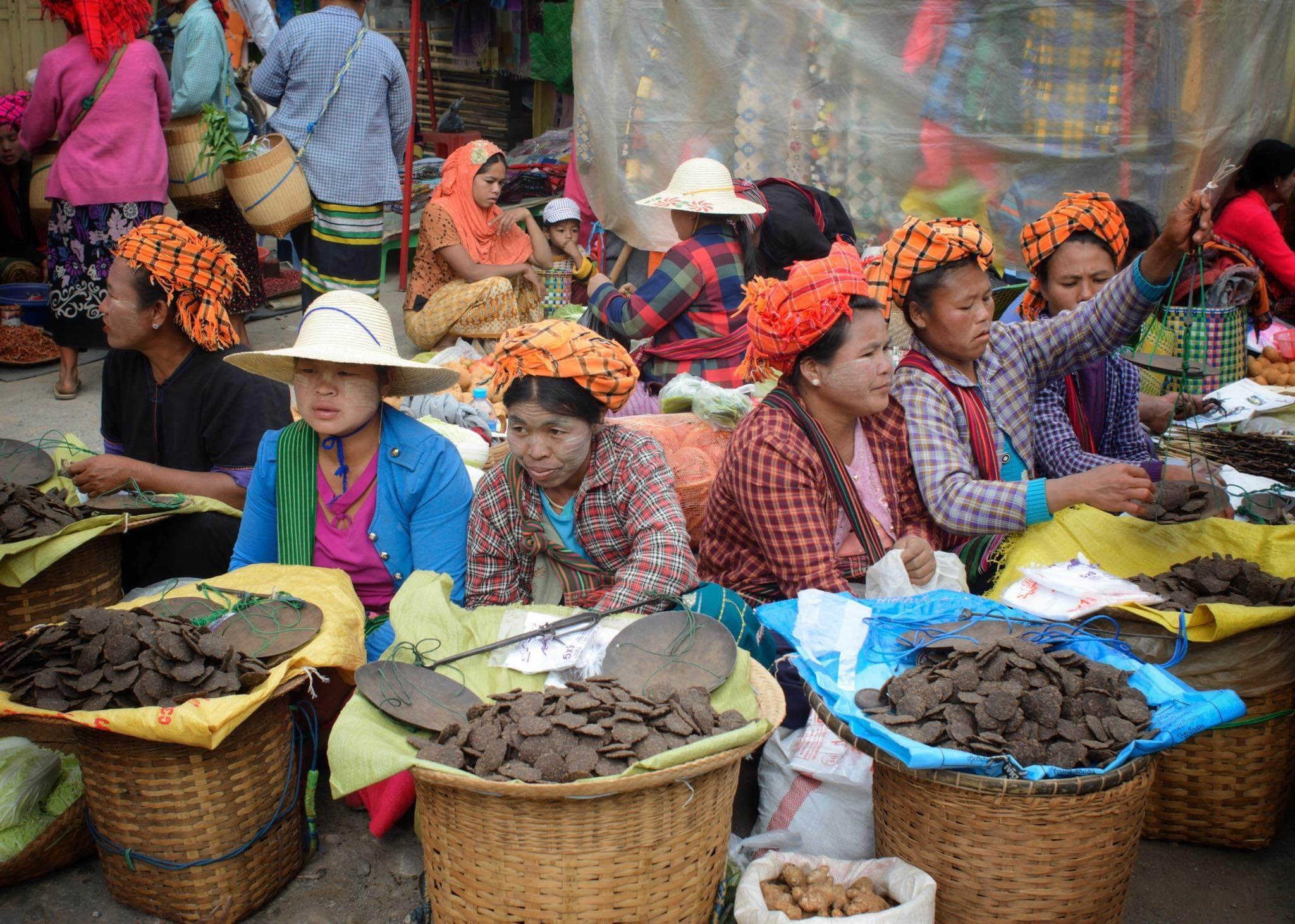
Ethnic women selling fermented soybeans on market day (12 January 2020)

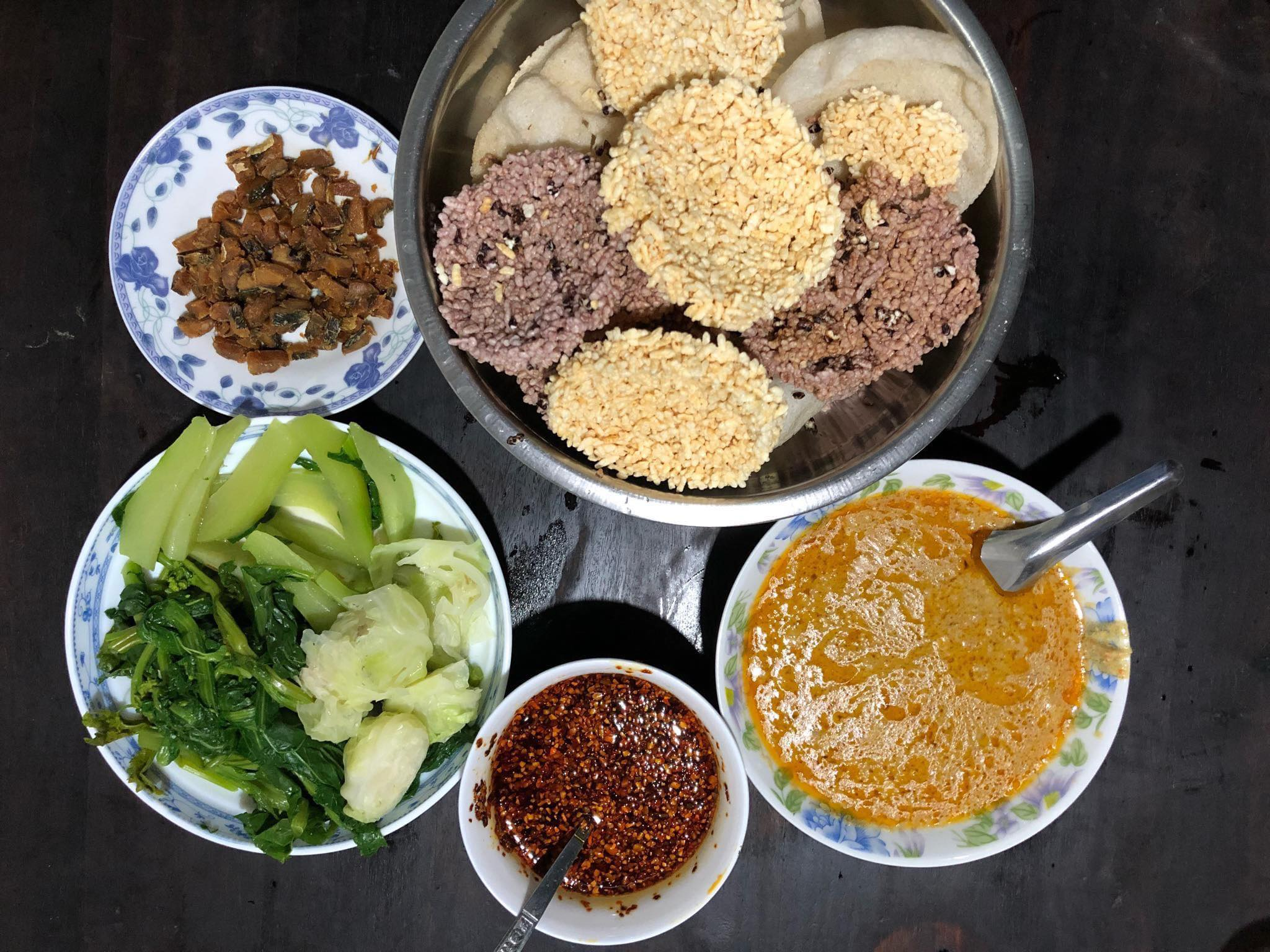
Dan traditional meal

Restaurants that specially serve seafood, hot pot, or BBQs are spread across the town.

=== Culture ===
Religious celebrations are held throughout the year. The Tazaungdaing festival is the most widely celebrated holiday of the town. It is also known as the Festival of Lights and it is usually held on the full moon day of Tazaungmon, the eighth month of the Burmese calendar (November in Gregorian calendar). It also marks the end of Kathina (ကထိန်) season, during which monks are offered new robes and alms.

During the festival, many hot air balloons are released as an offering to the Sulamani cetiya in Tavitisma, heaven in Buddhist cosmology and home of the deva, or as a way to drive away evil spirits. Hot-air balloons and firework-launching competitions are the main attractions of the town. Alms-giving and charity, both religious and secular, including satuditha feasts (စတုဒိသာ), are also commonly undertaken during this festival, as a means of merit-making.

Others return home to pay homage to elders (gadaw) and visit pagodas. In Burmese tradition, during the full moon day of Tazaungmon, Burmese families pick Siamese cassia buds and prepare it in a salad called mezali phu thoke (မယ်ဇလီဖူးသုပ်) or in a soup. The people believe that eating Mezali buds is beneficial to their health and will cure any illnesses. The salad has to be eaten when the clock strikes exactly 12:00 midnight to get the full effect. On this night, young men celebrate a custom called "kyimano pwe" (ကျီးမနိုးပွဲ, literally. "The Event before the Rise of Crows"), by stealing or playing tricks on the neighbors. Burmese people believe that this constellation is related to the Pleiades or Saw Ra (Theft) under whose influence people like to steal things.

== Economy ==
The town is vital in Myanmar's food production as it produces the majority of vegetables and agricultural commodities needed daily by Yangon and other populated cities. For instance, a study states that the town holds 80% of ginger production and market share in the country. The ILO Vision Zero Fund in Myanmar is providing ginger farmers from the town with better information on the safe use of agrochemicals and other Occupational safety and health (OSH) related information that can improve their working conditions and inform the government stakeholders including the Department of Agriculture.

The town's economy can be briefly classified into agrarian and non-agrarian. Farmers, village collectors, traders, BSCs (broker sale center), daily wage earners for quality sorting and cleaning products, porters, agricultural input-product dealers, etc. are at the frontline of the former economy. Many cargo trucks are operated by the townsmen, followed by several vehicle maintenance workshops, fuel stations and car spare part dealers. As farming is done on terraced fields and slopes, it is difficult to utilize machines at full scale and farmers still have to rely on animals, especially oxen and buffaloes. There is a periodic animal market in the town. The presence of several cattle spreading around the region has led dairy product firms to be established. The town is a leading yogurt producer in the southern Shan State.

The non-agrarian sector involves providing entertainment businesses, food, and basic supplies to the town's residences, which is doubled by army base stations around the town, boarding schools, and the military hospital. Private hospitals and supermarkets are likely to be developed soon, as the town's geological advantage and spending power of the community are attractive to investors. The recent Town Committee's permit to develop Aungban's Pindaya exit road as an entertainment zone let KTVs mushroom along the road, forming as the only red-light district in the region. Pin-Hmi golf range is located near the southern exit of the town. Special tournaments are often held by the club, which is commonly sponsored by KBZ Bank.

=== Tourism ===
A recent boom in the tourism industry of Kalaw as a hiking spot and hill station has brought some impact to Aungban as well. There are star-rated hotels offering hundreds of rooms to visitors. The number of international tourist arrivals in Aungban was 4,211 visitors, recorded in 2012, and increased to over 20,000 in 2018. There is a small resort on Aungban-Indein road, located in the midst of the pine forest, which is well known amongst local and foreign trekkers from Kalaw to Inle.

The town has a five-day market, where farmers from around the area come to Aungban on market day and sell fresh produce in the open market. The large street market circulates on a five-day rota system between the neighboring towns of Kalaw, Pindaya, Heho, Nyaung Shwe and Aungban.

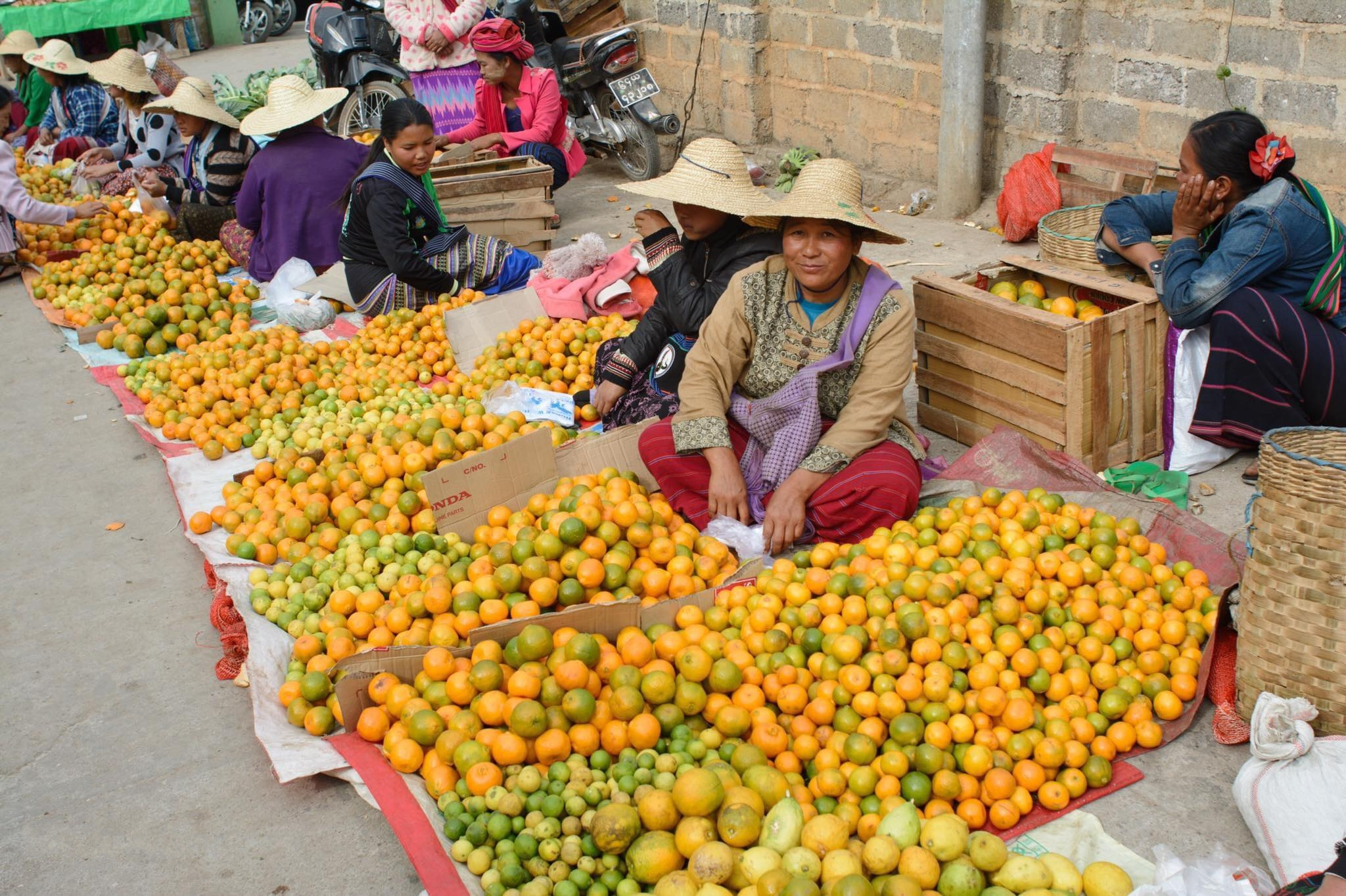
Market Day (27 December 2019)

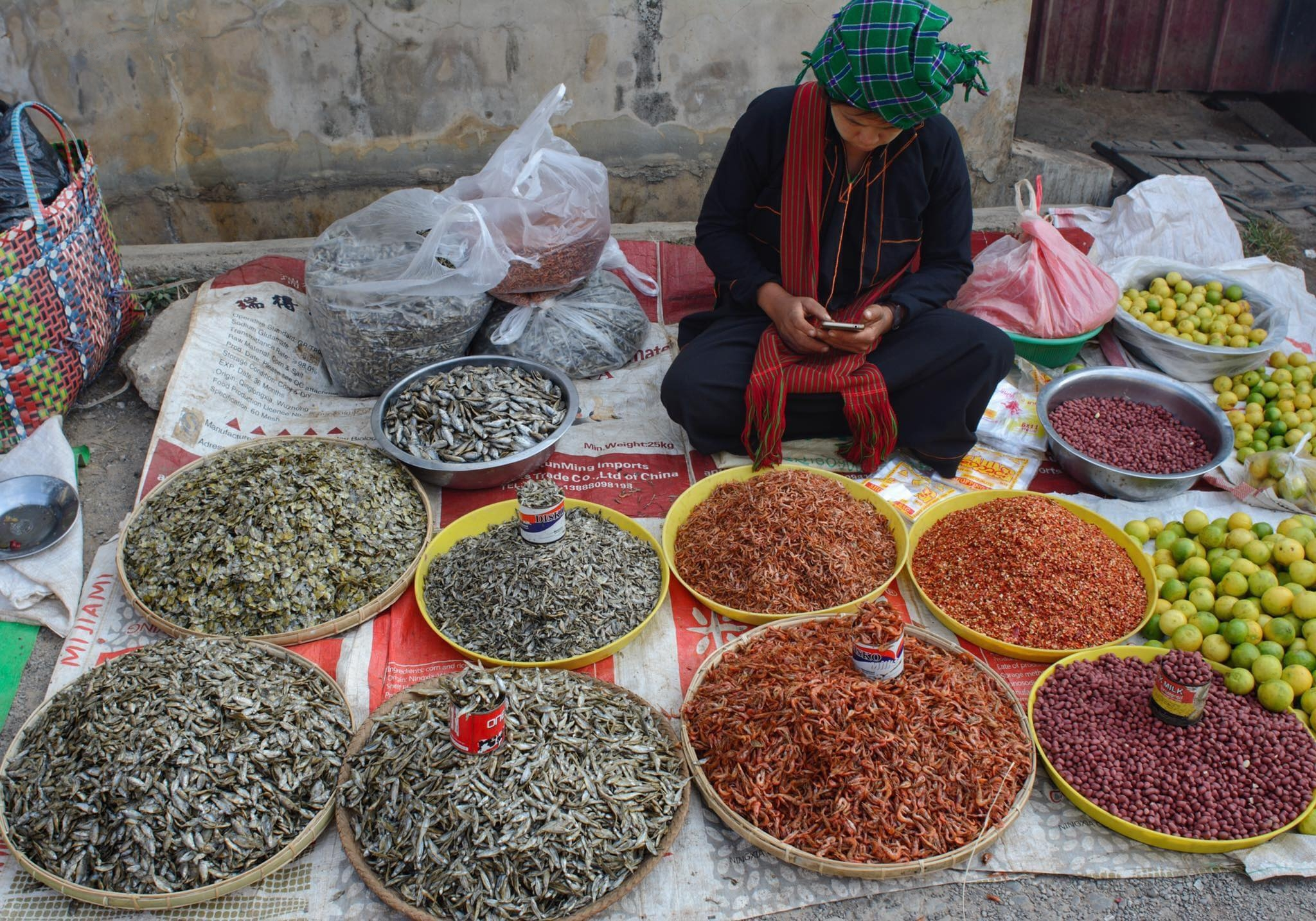
Market Day (2 January 2020)

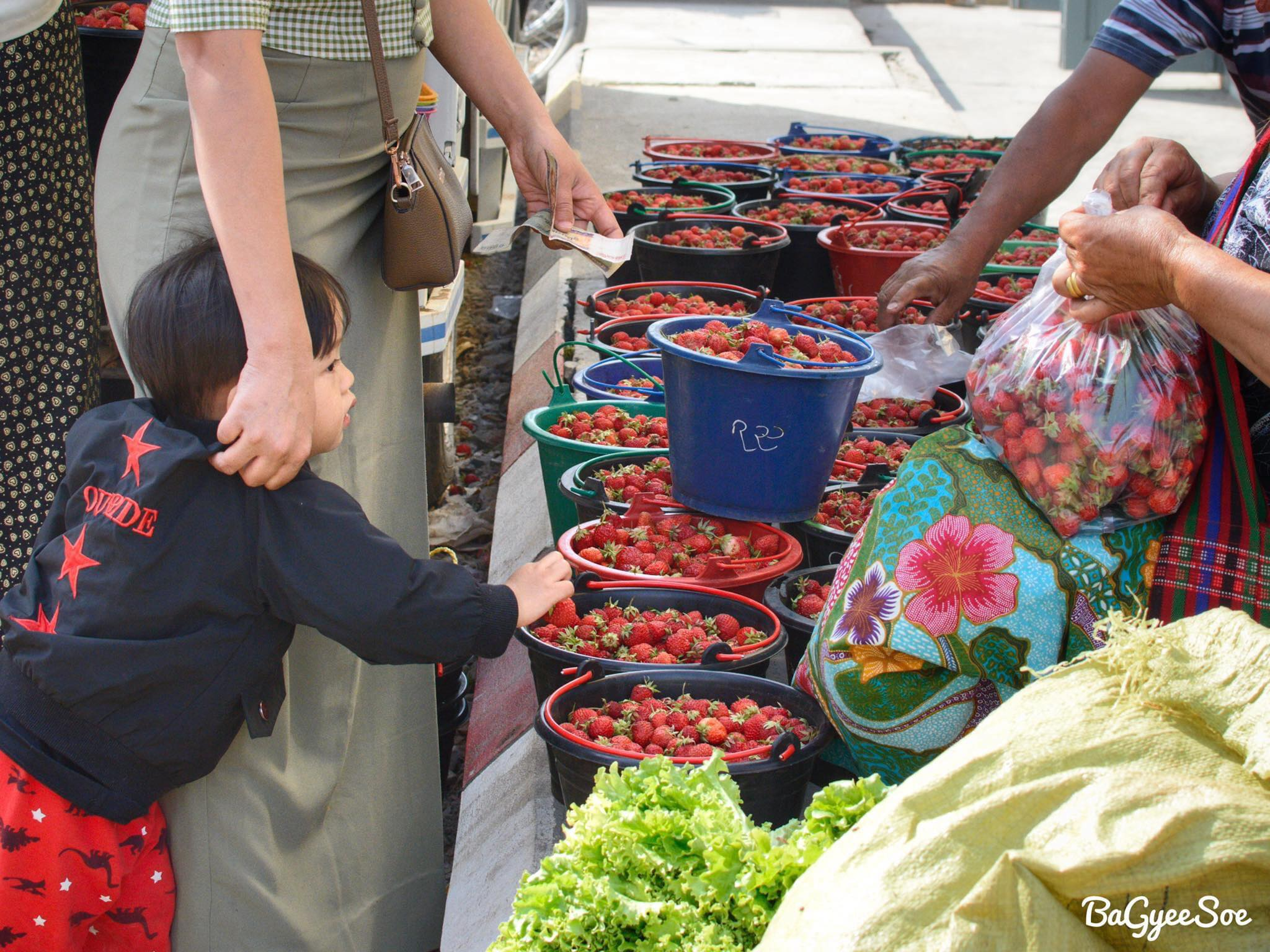
Market Day (21 March 2020)

Market in Aungban

=== Agriculture ===
Although the town's main economy is commercial trading, there are many farms and gardens in and outside of the town. Farmers and gardeners are mostly ethnically Danu and Pa-O. The main agricultural products are potatoes, cauliflower, avocadoes, oranges, tea leaves, tomatoes, beans, damsons, and seasonal fruits.

=== List of Banks being operated ===
Name	Address	Phone
CB Bank	No. (4/480), Pyi Htaung Su Road, Nyaung Pin Htaung Ward, Aungban	081-61275
AYA Bank	No (73/135), Pindaya Road, No (3) Ward, Aungban	081-61255
Yoma Bank	No (18/368), Pyitaungsu Road, No (4) Ward, Aungban	081–60482, 081–60483, 081–60490, 081–60491, 081-50492
UAB Bank	No. (43), Pyi Htaung Su Road, No (4) Ward, Aungban	081-61303
KBZ Bank	No. (47), Pyi Htaung Su Road, No (4) Ward, Aungban	081–60708, 081–61055, 081-61057
Global Treasure Bank	No. (8), Ba Htoo Street, No (4) Ward, Aungban	081- 61058, 081–61059, 081-61281
Myawaddy Bank	No. (26) Pyi Htaung Su Road, Moe Kaung Ward, Aungban	081-61311
AGD Bank	No. (24), U Thant Street, No (1) Ward, Aungban	-
MAB Bank	No. (26), Pyi Htaung Su Road, Moe Kaung Ward, Aungban	081–61278, 081-61279
First Private Bank	No. 187, Pyi Htaung Su Road, Nyaung Pin Htaung Ward, Aungban	081–60501, 081-60503
Source: Central Bank of Myanmar's List of Private Banks

== Education ==
The town is home to the regional campus of Yezin Agricultural University (YAU). Starting in the 2009 academic year, third-year and fourth-year undergraduate students have to select one crop as a specialized subject and study off-campus at one of seven designated farms of the Myanmar Agricultural Service, to expose students to their specialized crop and become crop specialists. Undergraduate students come to the Aungban branch to study and do research on maize and cereals. The seven-hundred-bed military hospital also serves as a teaching hospital for Defence Service Medical Academy's house surgeons from Yangon. Therefore, several students of various age-levels can be seen in the town.

The Education and Training Department from the Ministry of Border Affairs will soon open the Technical School for National Youths in Border Area, Aungban. Upon completion of all construction works on campus, 75 students will be able to enroll on the vocational training programme, in which the curriculum of each course is designed to take about 22 weeks. The school intends to educate 150 trainees a year.

Vocational training courses include :

1. Masonry and steelworks under civil construction

2. Household wiring, air-conditioning and refrigeration

3. Electric arc and gas welding

4. Automotive repair (engine, body and wiring)

5. Repair of IT devices

== Notable people ==
=== Dagon Taya ===
Dagon Taya Burmese: ဒဂုန်တာရာ; (10.5.1919 – 19.8.2013), was a renowned Myanmar writer. He was born at Htai Ku Myit Tan Village (Mon), Kyaiklat Township, Ayeyarwady Region on 10 May 1919. His other pen names were Myaing Thazin, Maung Nan Nwe, Saw Htut, U Toe, Maung Linn Htet, Banya Thiha and U Dagon.

He was one of the many dissident politicians, workers, students, and writers detained by the Revolutionary Council after a coup led by General Ne Win in 1962. He was detained in the Insein prison for three years and three months. He issued an appeal which strongly opposed the Myitsone Dam Project in September 2011.

He was honored with the Manhae Peace Prize from South Korea for his literature, leadership for young people and dedication to democracy and peace in August 2013.

He died at Aungban, southern Shan State on 19 August 2013. His monument can be seen at the Maeko Mountain (မယ်ခိုတောင်) of Aungban surrounded by pine trees.

=== Lu Min (actor) ===
Lu Min (Burmese: လူမင်း) is a four-time Myanmar Academy Award winning Burmese actor and director. Born and raised in Aungban, he was Chairman of the Myanmar Motion Picture Organisation from 2014 to 2017. He acted in over 1000 films.

== Aungchanthar Pagoda ==
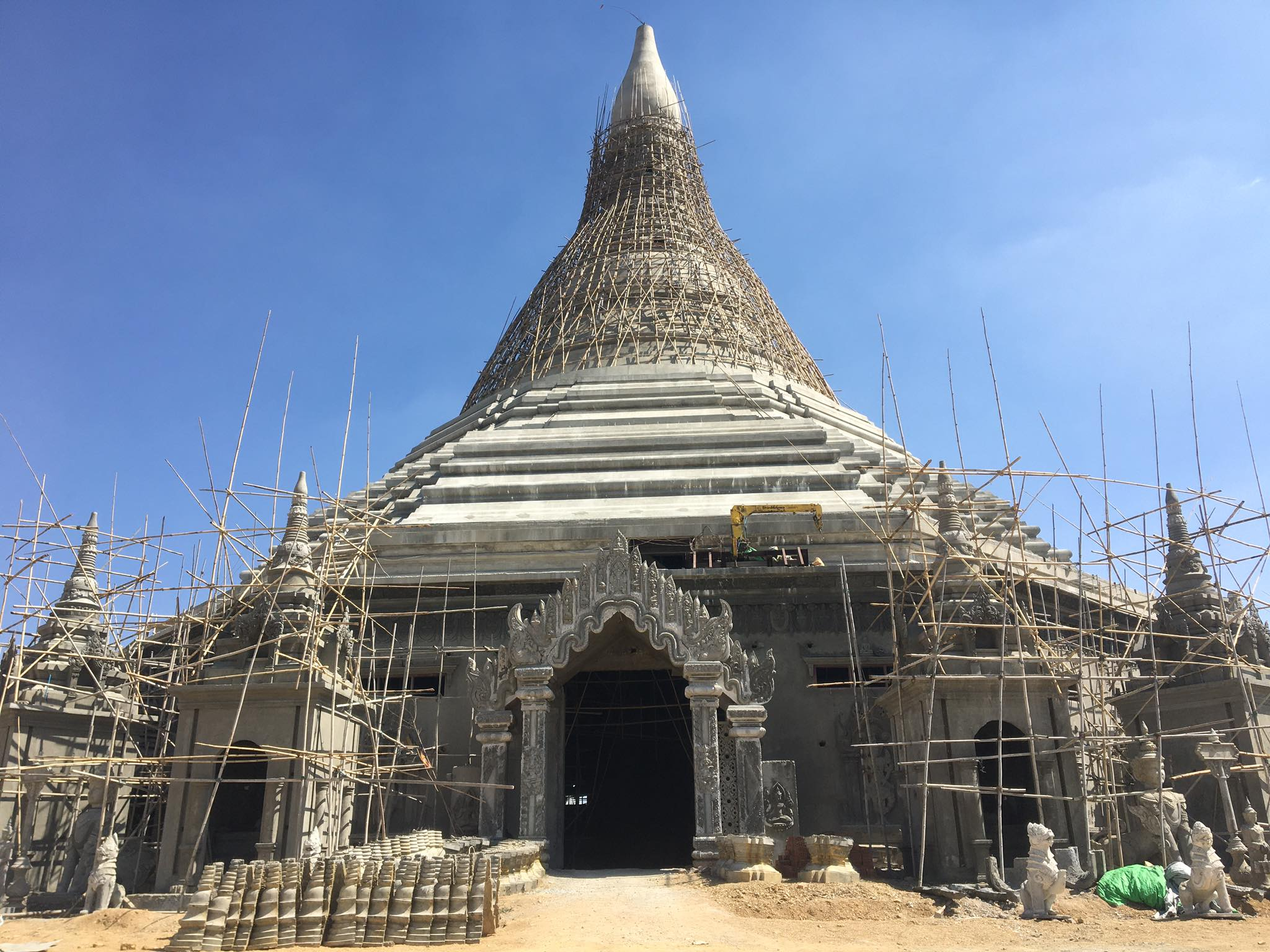
Aung Chan Thar Pagoda under construction. (February 2020)

Aungchanthar Pagoda is a 162-foot (49-meter) replica of Yangon's Shwedagon Pagoda. It was founded on 20 July 2005 – the full moon day of Waso, (1367 in the Myanmar calendar). Its name means "Victory and Prosperity".

Leading the project is U Pyinnya Wunsa (68 years old), the abbot of Aungchanthar monastery and a member of the State Sangha Maha Nayaka Committee, locally known as Aungchanthar Sayadaw.

As of 2020, the pagoda has been under construction for about fifteen years. In 2005, it was estimated to cost about Kyat 7.6 billion. When completed, the pagoda will be encircled by 107 smaller stupas, ranging in height from 6 to 12 feet (1.8 to 3.7 m). While the Aungchanthar Pagoda will replicate Shwedagon Pagoda, it will also incorporate a hollow interior.

== Aungban's 100th year Anniversary ==
2013 marks the 100th anniversary of the founding of the town. The locals celebrated the town's 100th anniversary from 23-March to 10-April with many celebrations. The town's 100-years-anniversary clock-tower was also built at the Pindaya junction. The tower was removed in 2019 due to the upgrading of the Thazi-Kyaingtong four-lane road and will be rebuilt in the same place.

== Gallery ==
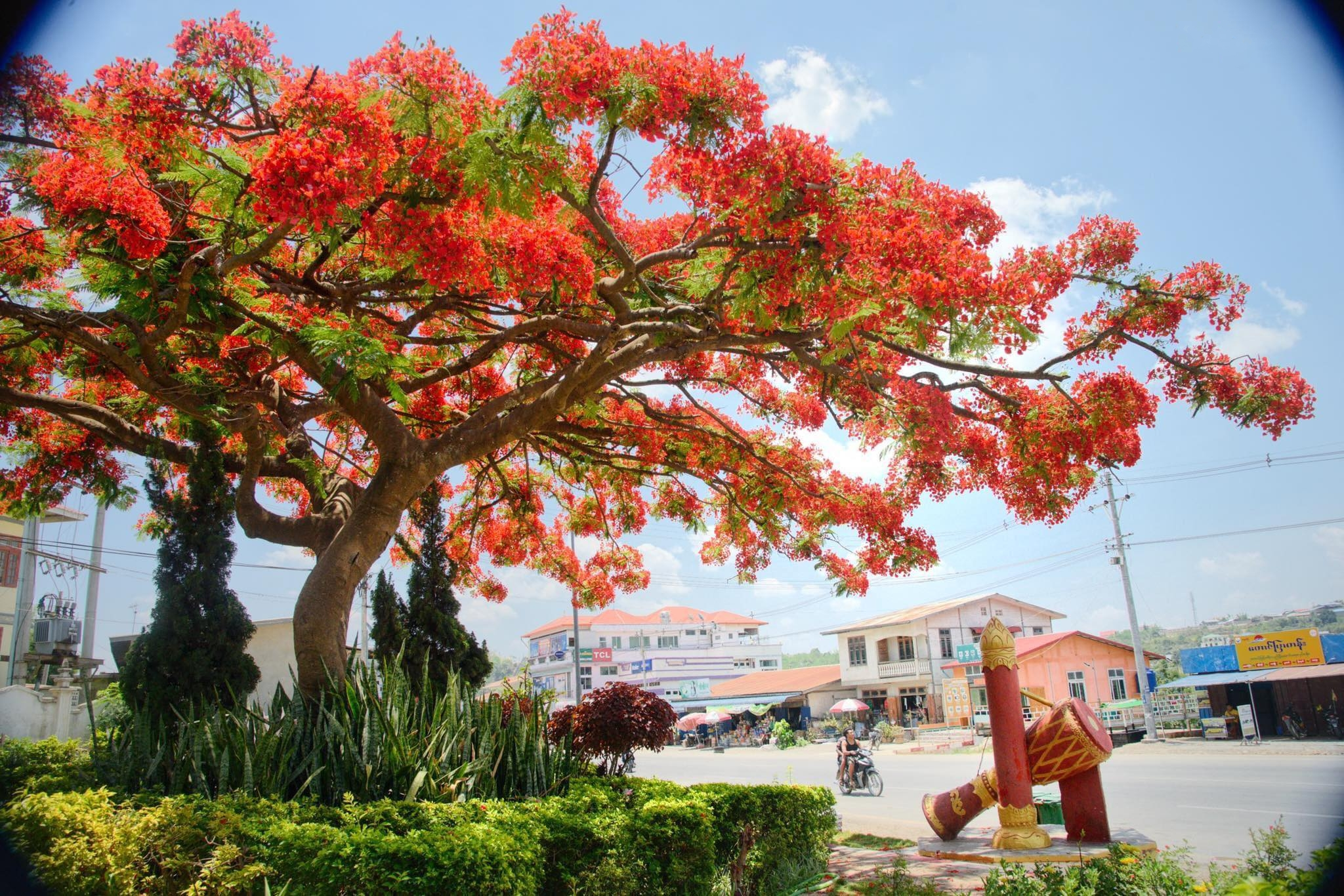
A small park beside the Union Road (May 2020)

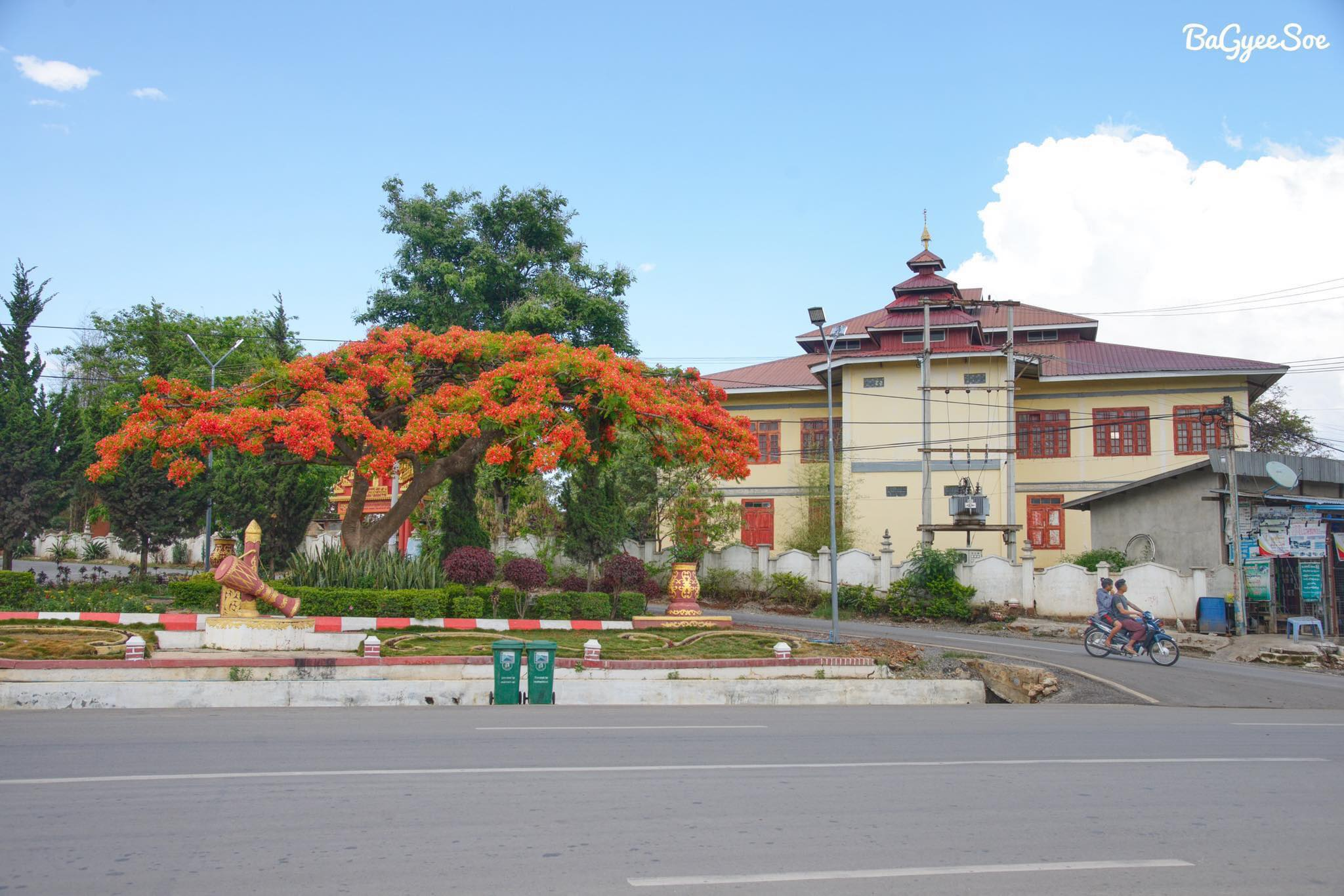
A small park beside the Union Highway (May 2020)

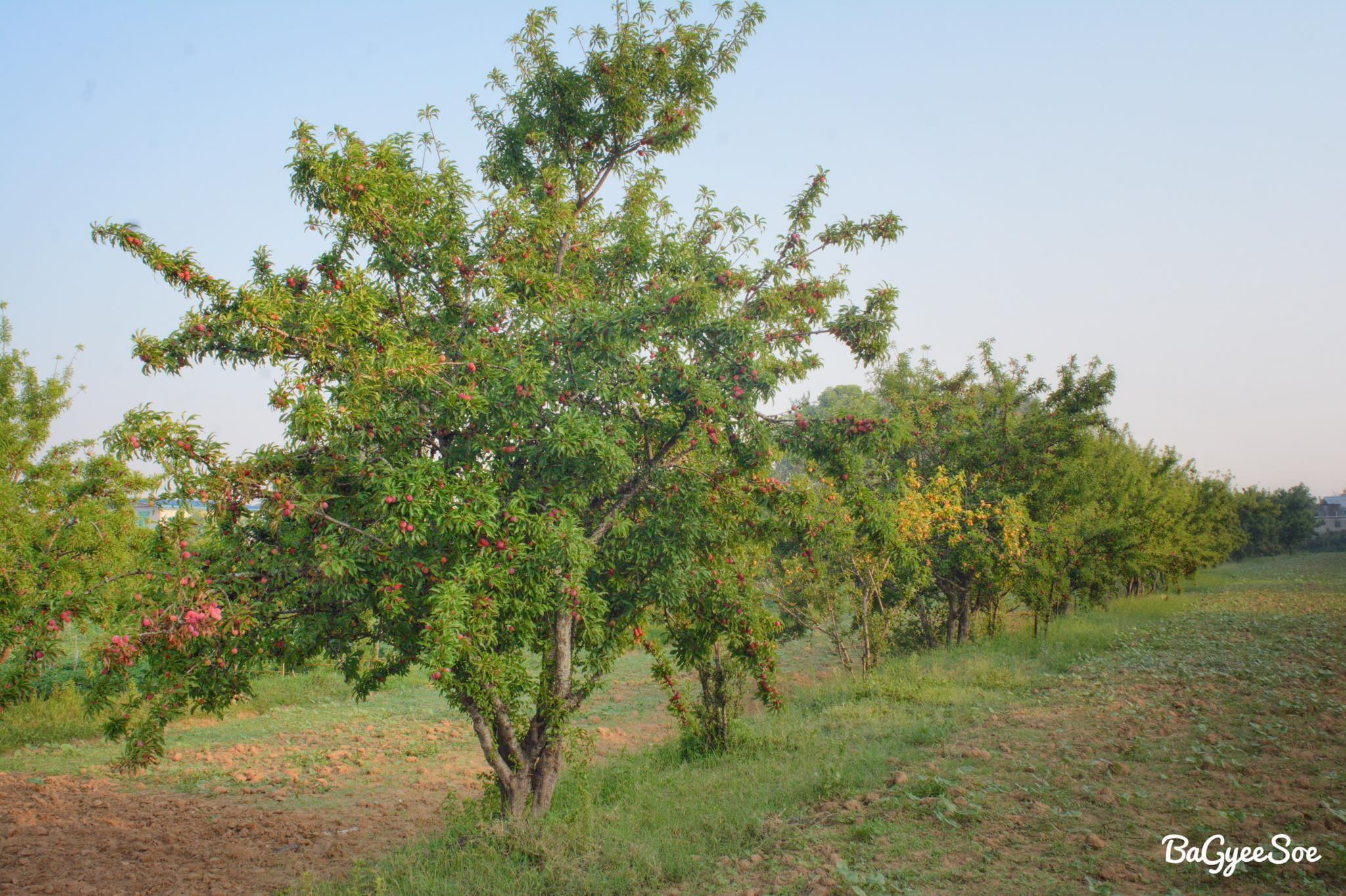
Damson farm (May 2020)

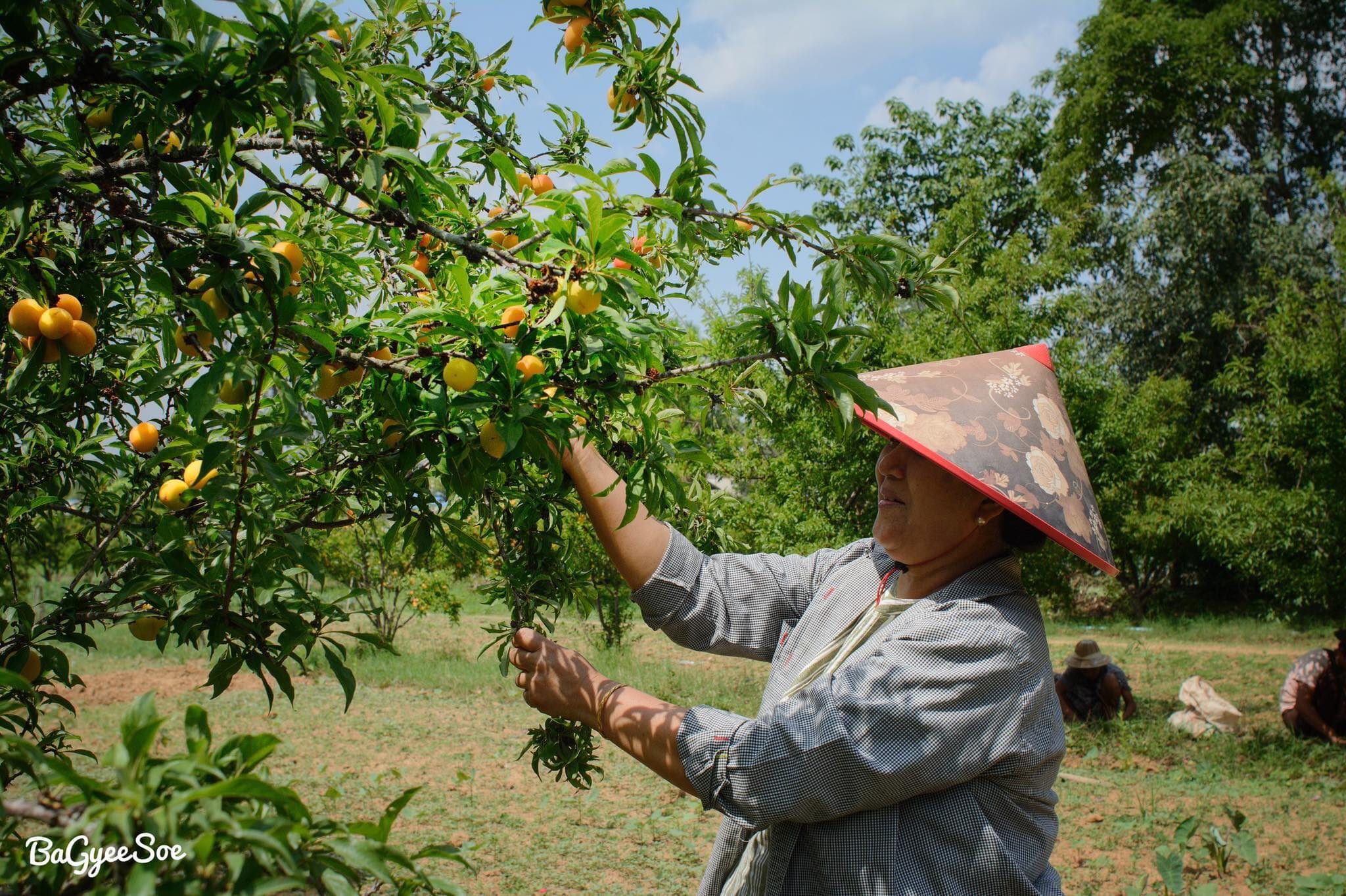
A woman harvesting seasonal fruit in a garden (May 2020)

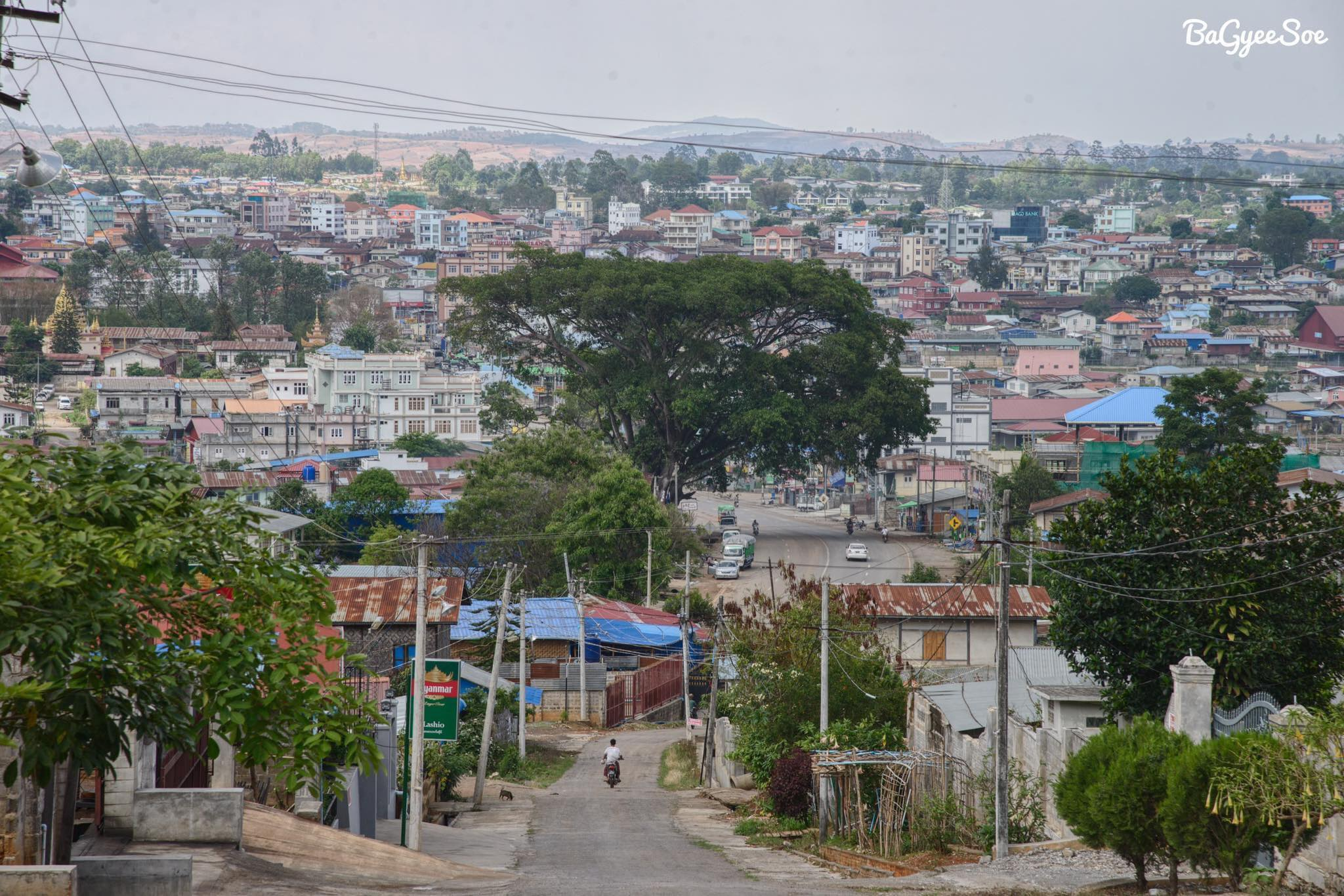
Some part of the town (May 2020)

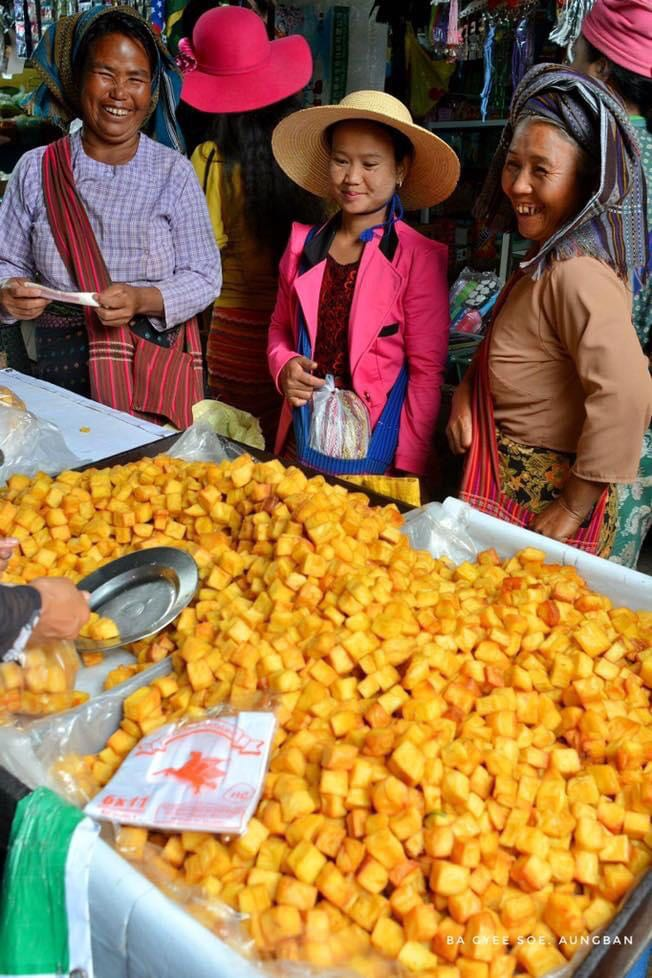
Ethnic women buying fried Tofu (April 2020)

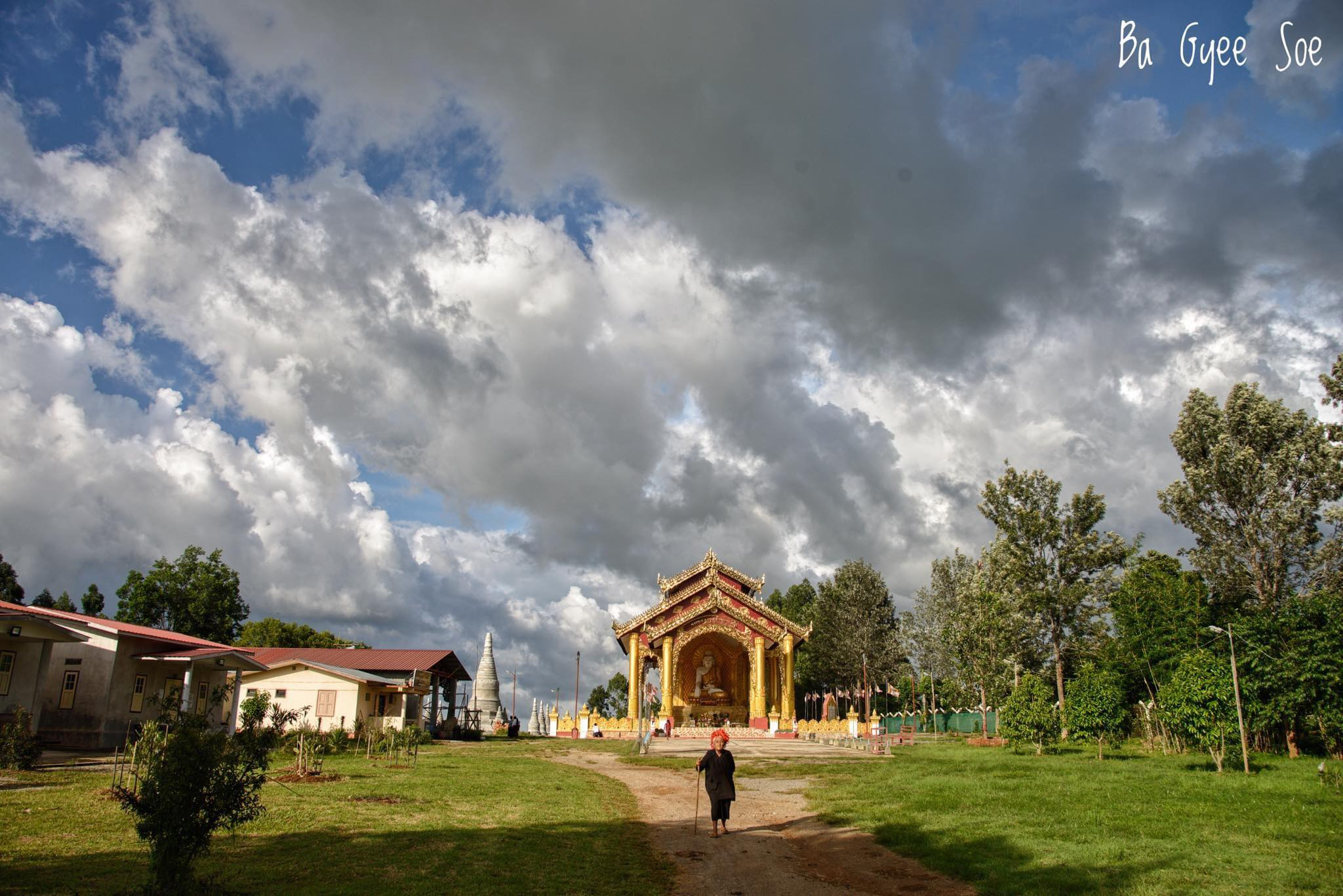
Mahar Shwe Bayin pagoda (April 2020)

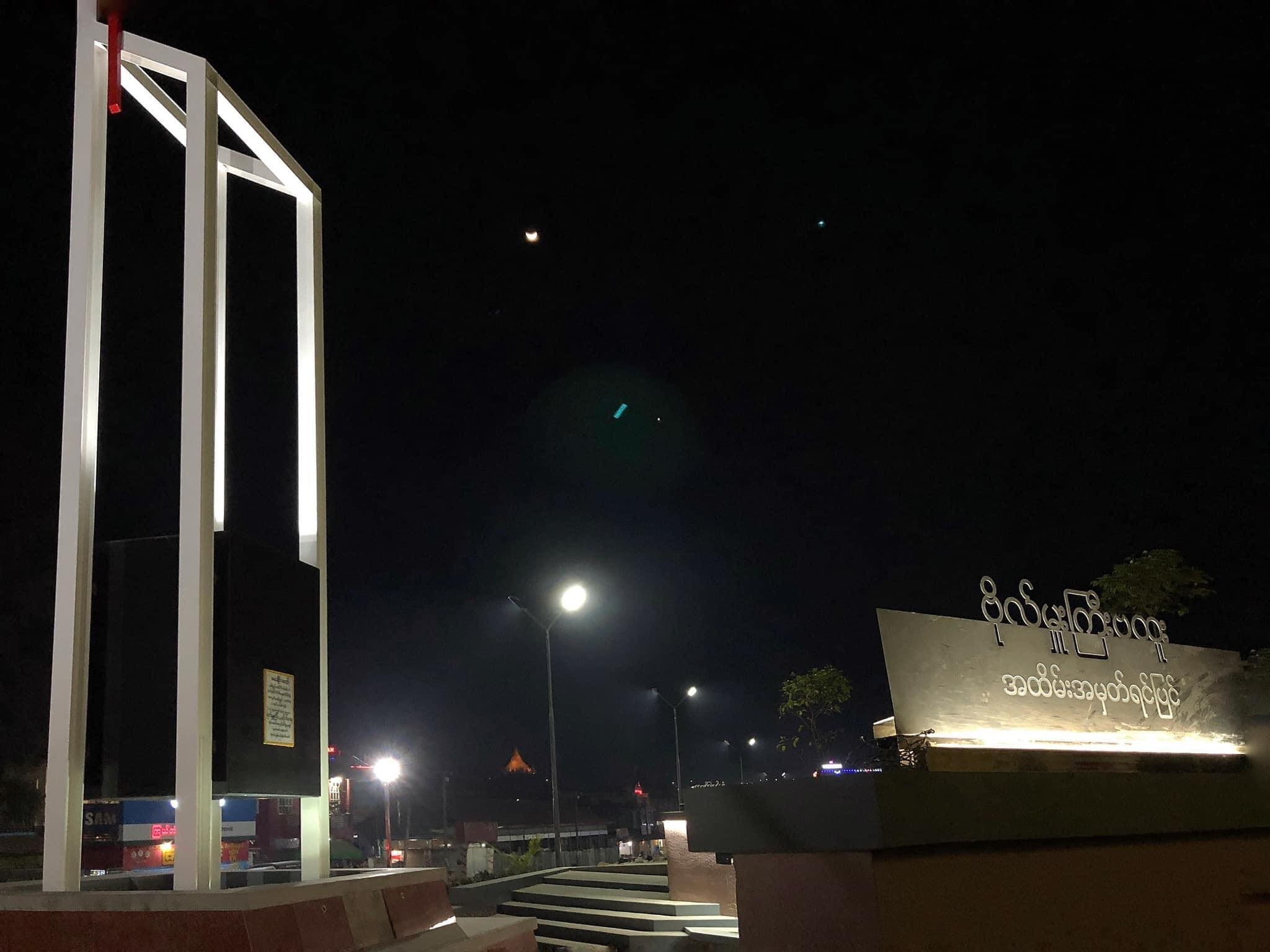
Col. Ba Htoo Monument night view (March 2020)

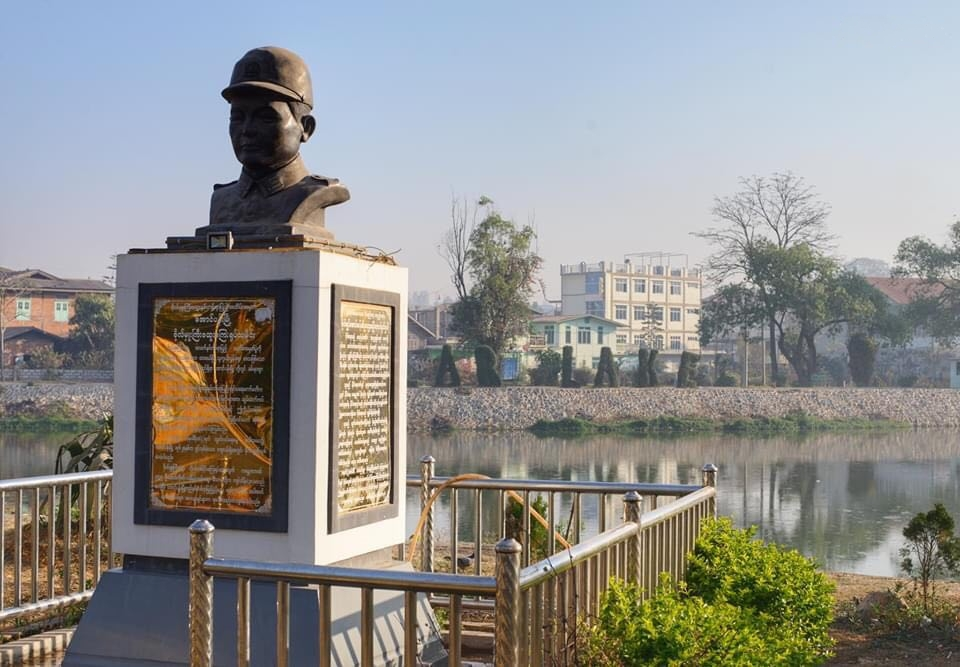
Bust of Col. Ba Htoo (March 2020)

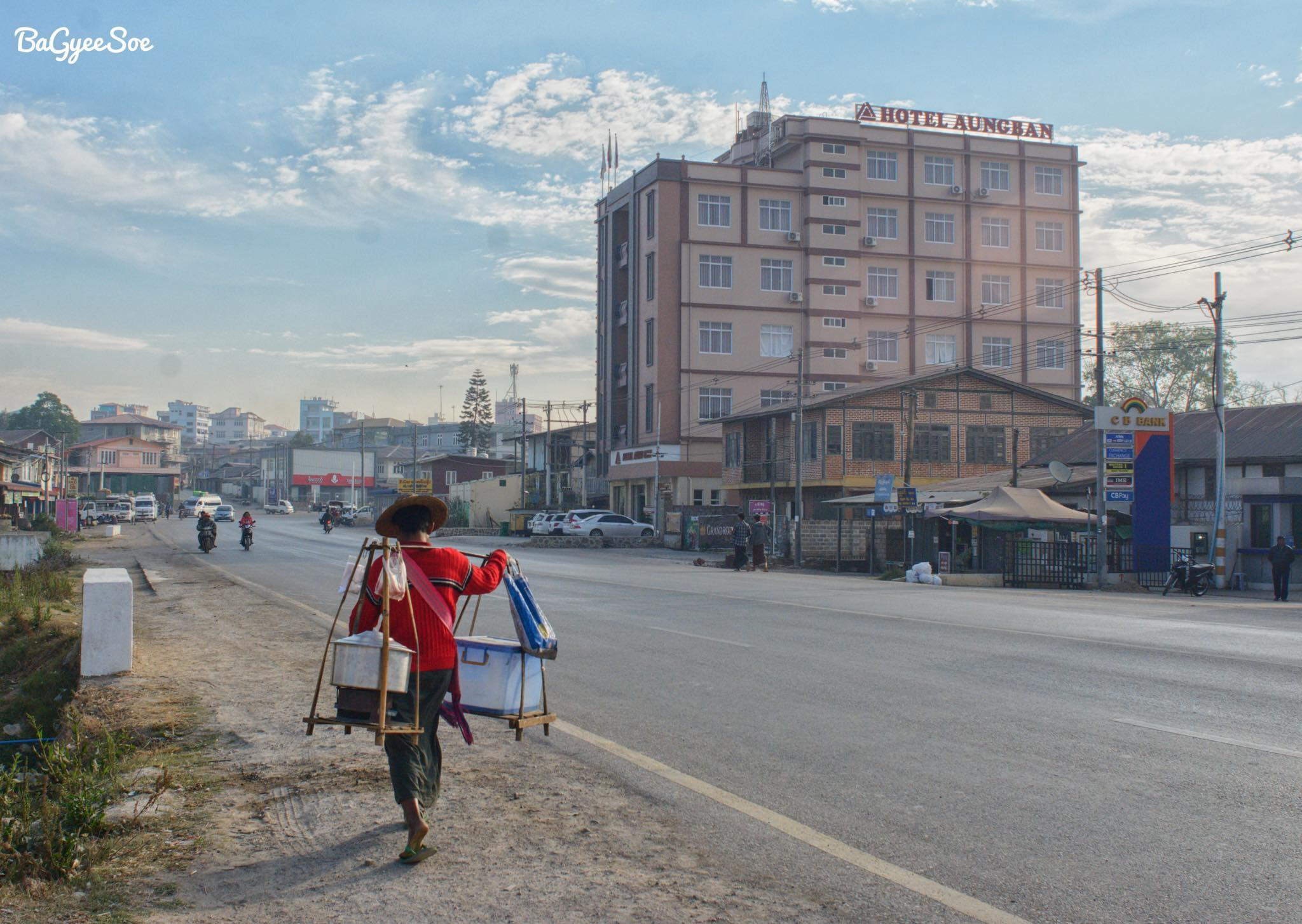
Some part of the town (March 2020)

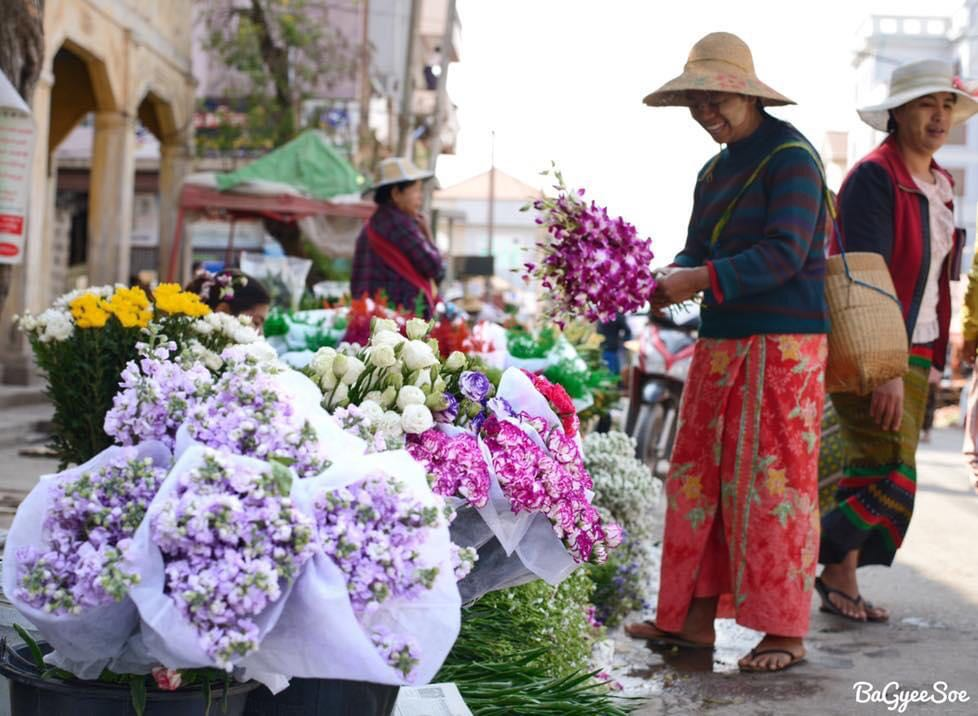
Market Day (6 March 2020)

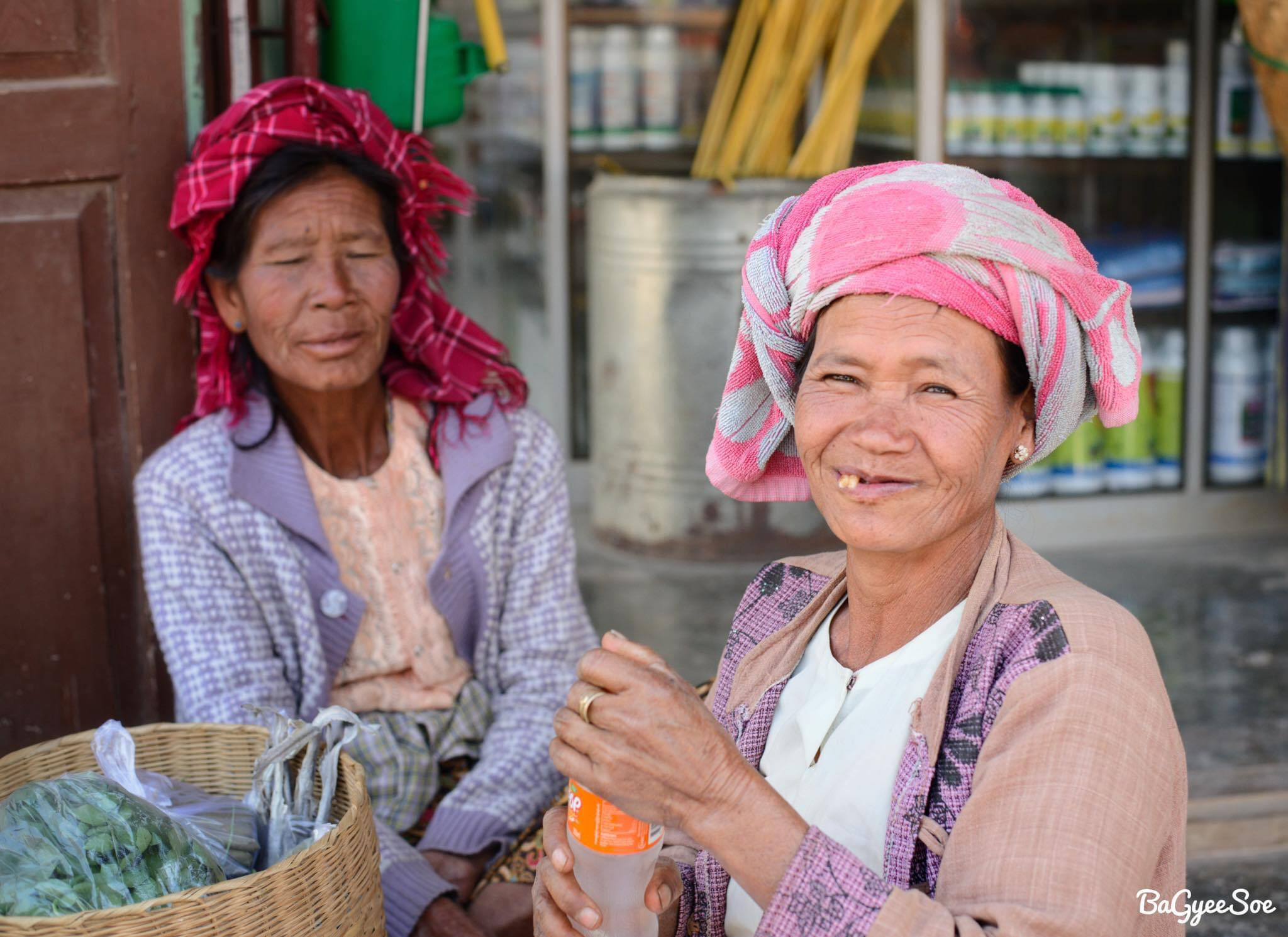
Local ethnic (March 2020)

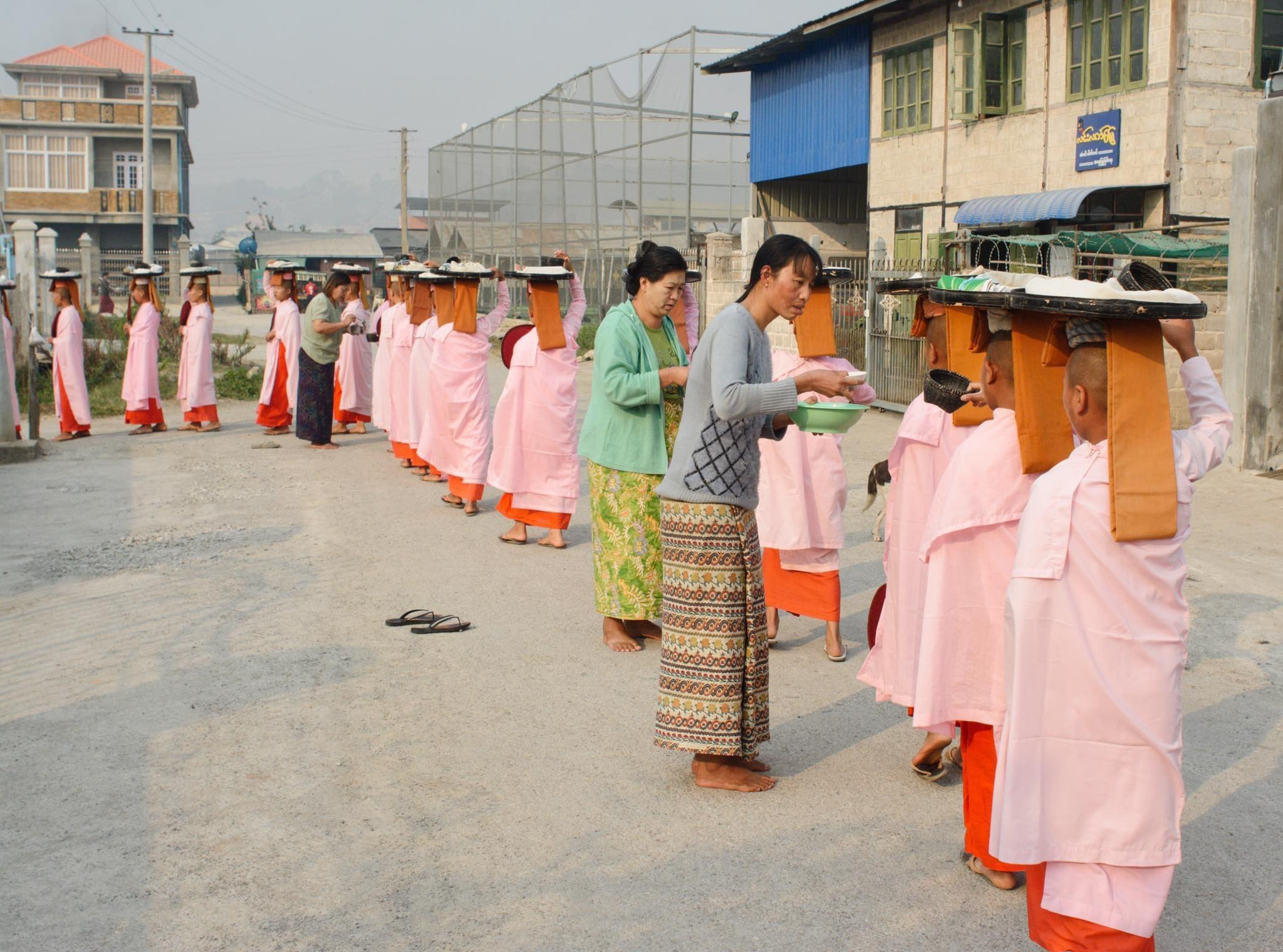
Locals Offering rice to Thilashin (March 2020)

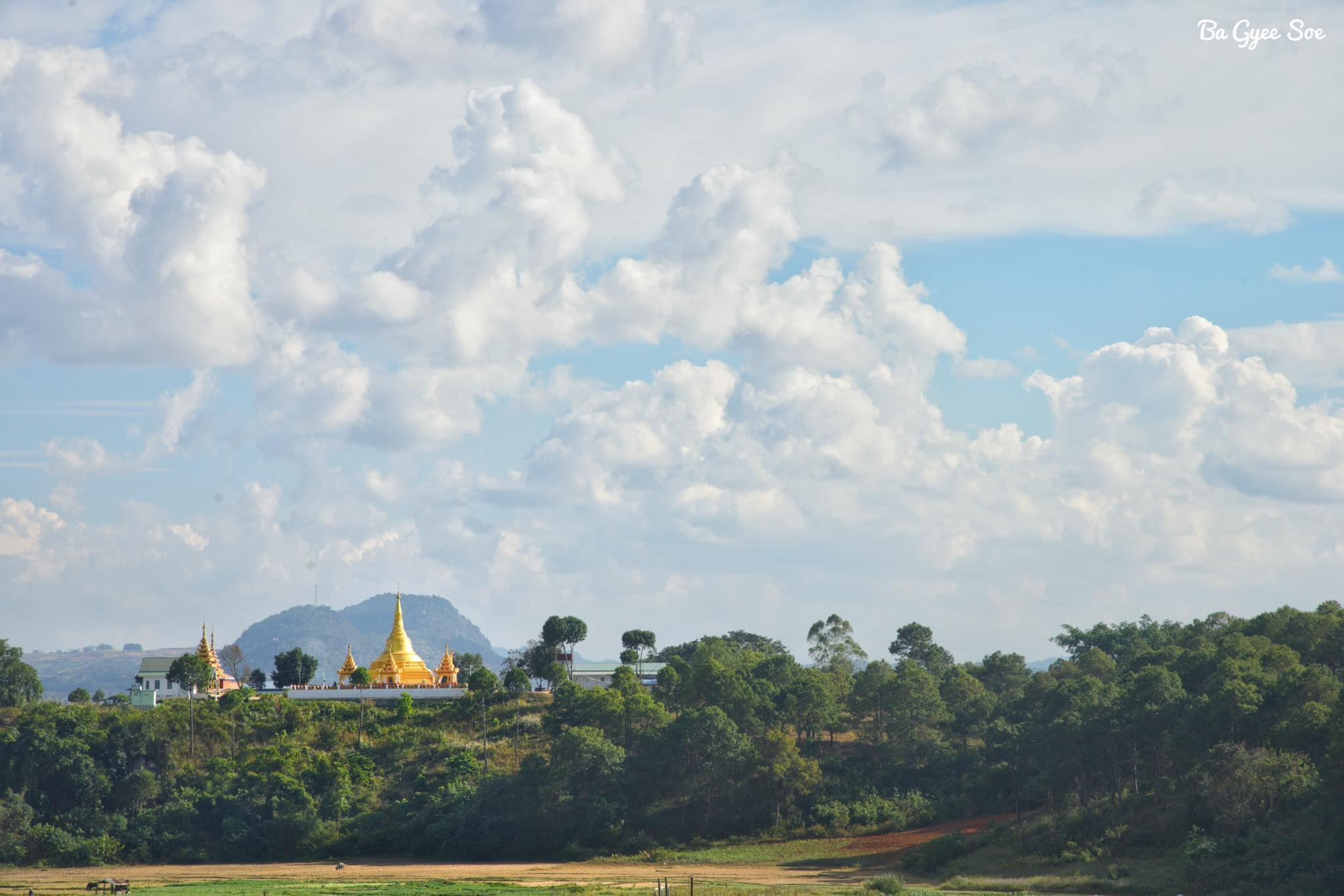
A pagoda on a hill of the town (December 2019)

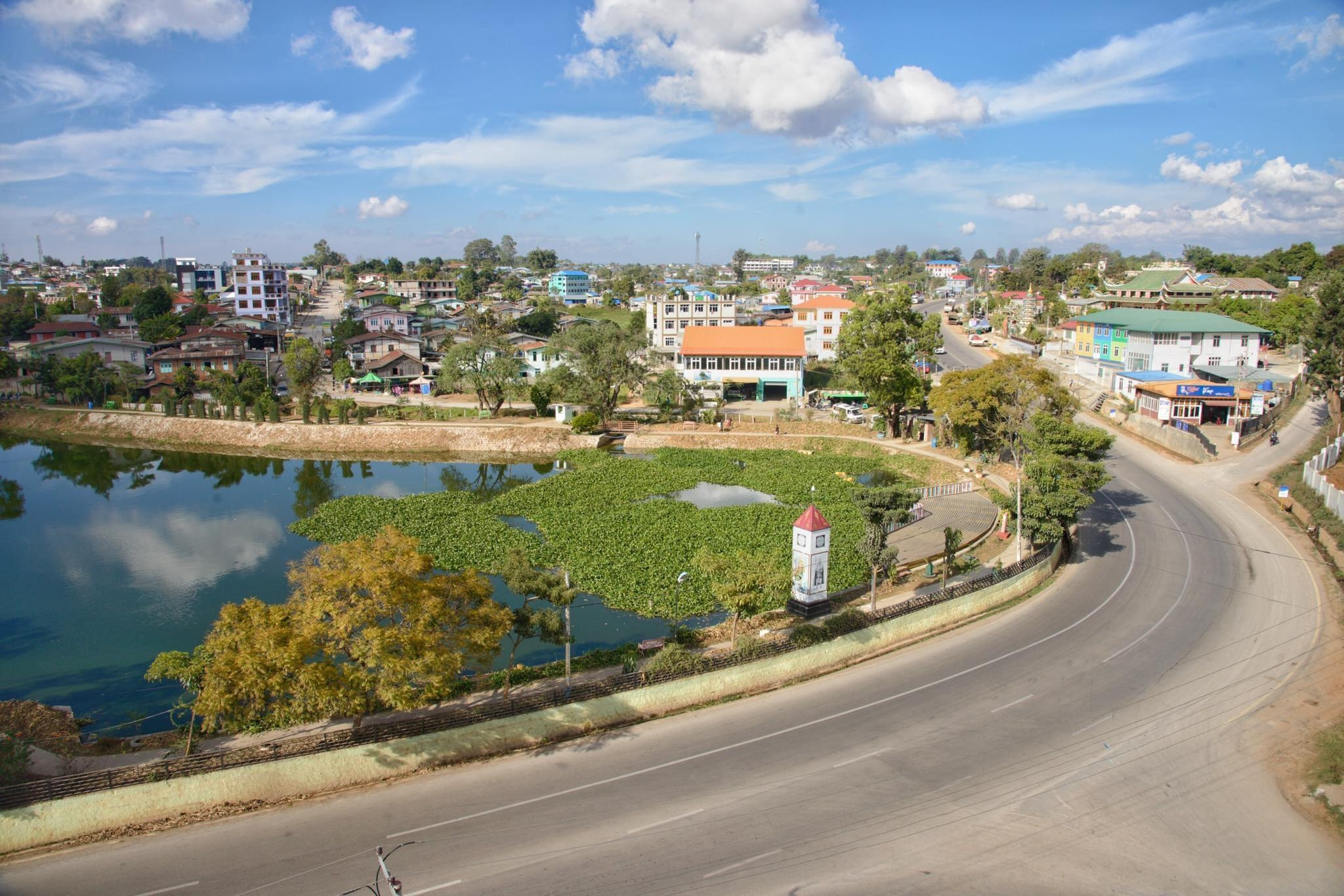
Mingalar Lake beside the Union Road (December 2019)
