= Basic Education High School Khale =

Coordinates: 16°06′19″N 97°54′09″E

Basic Education High School Kale အ.ထ.က. ခလယ်
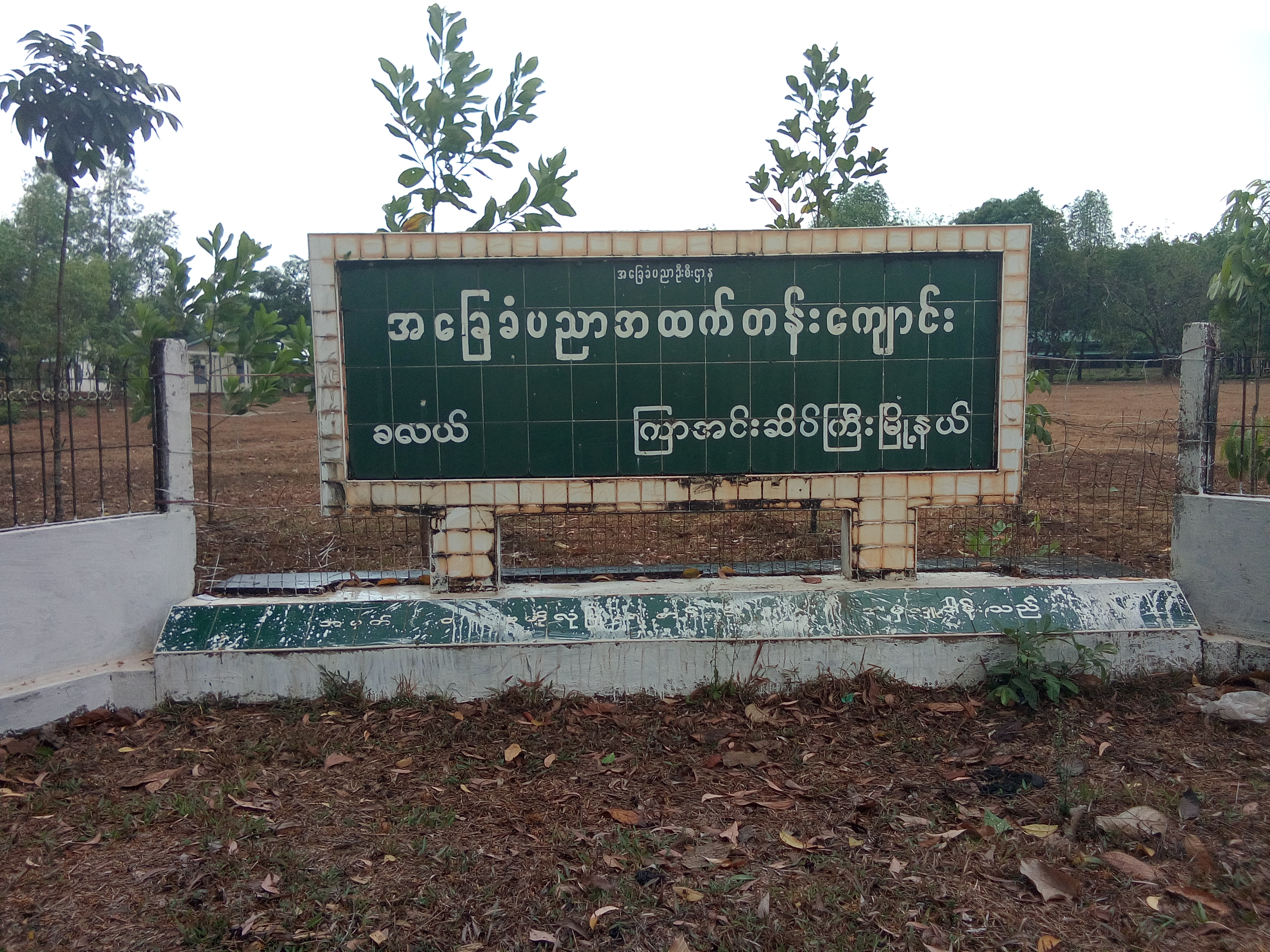
- Signboard of B.E.H.S - Khale
- Kale, Kayin State; Myanmar

Information
- Type: Public
- School number: 3
- Principal: Thein Win
- Grades: K-10
- Campus: 7.6 acres (31,000 m^{2})

Basic Education High School Kale (Burmese: အခြေခံပညာအထက်တန်းကျောင်း ခလယ် [a˘c’igan pjìɲà a˘t’eqta´n cau´n kʰa̰lɛ]) is a public high school in Kale, Kayin State, Myanmar.
