= Kale, Kayin State =

Kale ခၠိုင့်
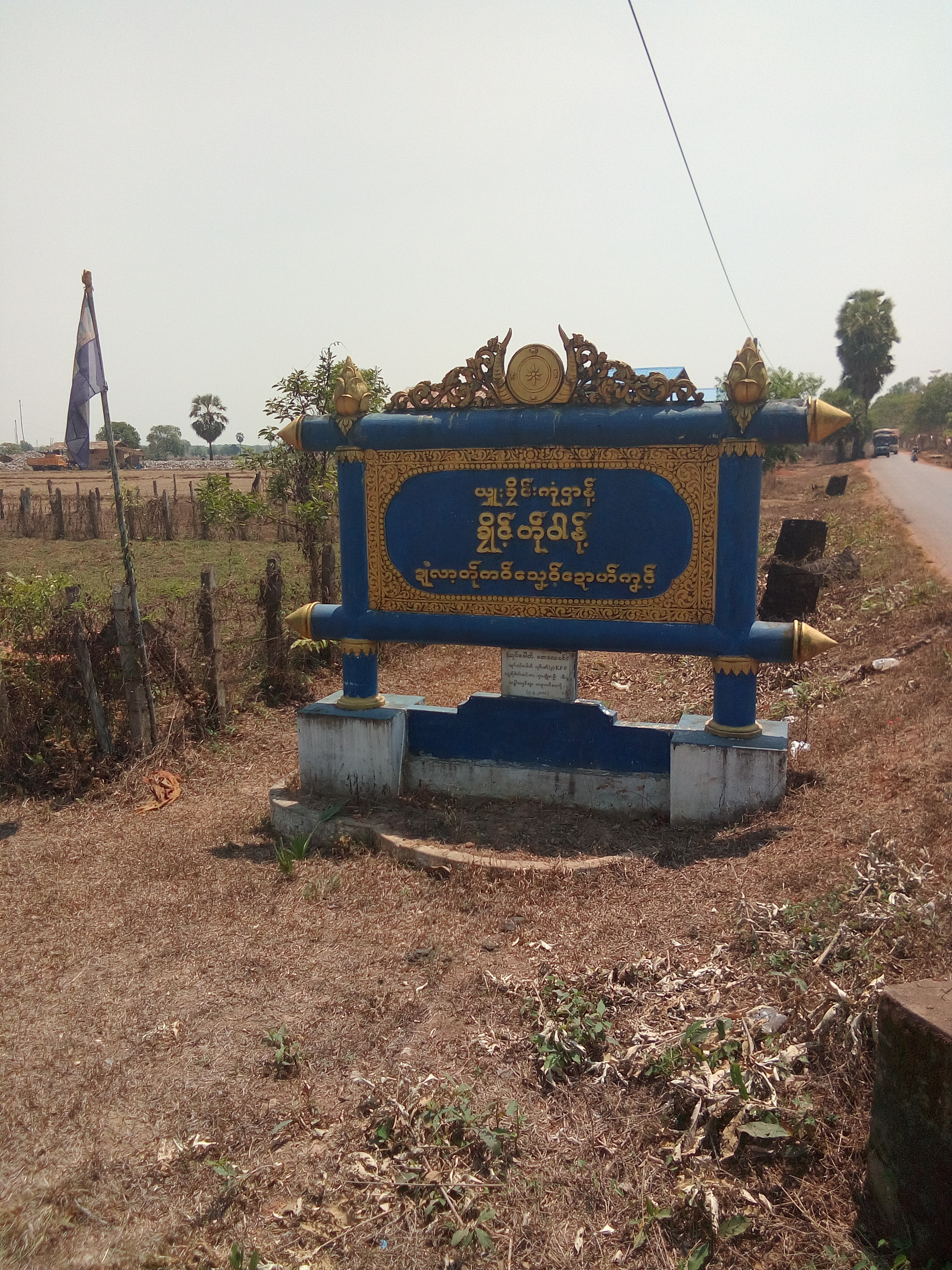
- Signboard of Kha Lel or Kale

- Location in Myanmar
- Coordinates: 16°5′46″N 97°53′56″E
- Country: Myanmar
- State: Kayin State
- District: Kawkareik District
- Township: Kyain Seikgyi Township
- Elevation: 18 m (59 ft)

Population (2014)
  - Total: 5,355
  - Religions: Buddhism
- Time zone: UTC+6.30 (MST)
- Postal code: 170764
- Area code: 58
- WOEID: 1017440

ခၠိုင့် (Pwo Eastern Karen: ခၠိုင့်; Burmese: ခလယ် [kʰa̰ lɛ], also spelled Kha Lel or Khale) is a large village in Kyain Seikgyi Township, Kawkareik District, in the Kayin State of Myanmar. According to 2014 Myanmar Census, the total population in Kale is 5,355. The Kha Lel village tract contains 5 villages and in 2014, it had a total population of 8,869 people.

== People from Kale ==
- Saw Ba Oo
