= Telephone numbers in Myanmar =

Telephone numbers in Myanmar (Burma)
- Myanmar in relation to ASEAN
- Country: Myanmar (Burma)
- Continent: Asia
- Country code: +95
- International access: 00

Telephone numbers in Myanmar are 8 to 11 digits long including the trunk prefix.

== Myanmar ==
List of area codes: 5621 / Myanmar
Area Code	Area/City	Carrier
1	Yangon	
1234	MPT	
1351	Yangon	MPT
1352	Yangon	MPT
1358	Yangon	MPT
1364	Yangon	MPT
1359	Yangon	M
1422	Yangon	Myanmar APN Mytel
1426	Yangon	Myanmar Speed Net
1439	Yangon	Ooredoo
1824	Yangon	MPT
1825	Yangon	MPT
1837	Yangon	MPT
1838	Yangon	MPT
1839	Yangon	MPT
1964	Yangon	MPT
2	Mandalay	
2200	Mandalay	MYtel
2283	Mandalay	MPT
2284	Mandalay	MPT
2400	Mandalay	MPT
2402	Mandalay	MPT
2403	Mandalay	MPT
2405	Mandalay	MPT
2406	Mandalay	MPT
2407	Mandalay	MPT
2408	Mandalay	MPT
2426	Mandalay	Myanmar Speed Net
2439	Mandalay	Ooredoo
2515	Mandalay	MPT
2517	Mandalay	MPT
3	Military	
42202	Hintthda	MPT
4224	Pathein	MPT
4240	Ngwesaung	
42204	Chaungtha	MPT
4243	Thapaung	
42204	Ngaputaw	MPT
4250	Mawlamyinekyun	
4260	Warkhema	
4265	Kyonemangay	
4270	Myaungmya	
4271	Myaungmya	
42208	Latputtha	MPT
4285	Einme	
4321	Sittwe	
4322	Sittwe	
4323	Sittwe	
4342	Ngapali (Shwe War Gyaing)	
4343	Ngapali (Shwe War Gyaing)	
4344	Ngapali (Shwe War Gyaing)	
4346	Kyaukphyu	
4355	Maungtaw	
4360	Taungoke	
4365	Thandwe	
4421	Hinthada	
4430	Ingapu	
4435	Zalon	
4440	Kyankin	
4450	Myanaung	
4521	Maubin	
4531	Maubin	
4540	Pyapon	
4545	Bogalay	
4548	Kyaiklat	
4550	Twante	
4620	Nyaungdone	
4625	Danuphyu	
4630	Pantanaw	
4640	Kyaungkone	
4650	Athoi	
4652	Yaykyi	
4656	Kyonepyaw	
4660	Ngathaingchaung	
5221	Bago	
5222	Bago	
5230	Oathar Myothit	
5231	Oathar Myothit	
5240	Daikoo	
5242	Shwekyin	
5246	Thanatpin	
5250	Nyaunglaypin	
5259	Pyuntanzar	
5265	Phayargyi	
5270	Pyinpongyi	
5275	Waw	
5321	Pyay	
5322	Pyay	
5323	Pyay	
5324	Pyay	
5325	Pyay	
5330	Minhla	
5332	Latpadan	
5334	Zeegone	
5336	Nattalin	
5338	Paungde	
5340	Padaung	
5350	Gyobingauk	
5355	Shwetaung	
5421	Taungoo	
5423	Taungoo	
5424	Taungoo	
5425	Taungoo	
5426	Taungoo	
5440	Phyu	
5450	Kanyutkwin	
5455	Penwegone	
5460	Kyaukdagar	
5520	Taikgyi	
5530	Tharyawaddy	
5621	Thanlyin	
5622	Thanlyin	
5625	Kyauktan	
5630	Khayan	
57202	Mawlamyine	MPT
5740	Thahton	
5750	Ye	
5760	Kyeikhto	
5764	Beelin	
5769	Kyaikk aw	
5770	Mudon	
5775	Kyaikkhame	
5779	Thanphyuzayat	
5780	Chaungsone	
5821	Hpaan	
5822	Hpaan	
5840	Kawkayeik	
5845	Hlaing-Bwe	
5846	Hlaing-Bwe	
5847	Hlaing-Bwe	
5848	Hlaing-Bwe	
5849	Hlaing-Bwe	
5850	Myawaddy	
5870	Hpaan	
5871	Mawlamyaing	
5921	Dawei	
5930	Palaw	
5941	Myeik	
5951	Kawthaung	
6021	Yenangyaung	
6030	Yenangyaung Industrial Zone	
6124	Chauk	
6124	Bagan	
6150	Kyaukpadaung	
6151	Kyaukpadaung	
6160	Nyaung OO	
6165	Bagan Myothit	
6221	Pakokku	
6222	Pakokku	
6229	Pakokku	
6230	Yasagyo	
6240	Myaing	
6250	Gantgaw	
6271	Shinmataung	
6323	Magwe	
6324	Magwe	
6325	Magwe	
6326	Magwe	
6327	Magwe	
6340	Sinphyukyun	
6342	Salin	
6350	Taungdwingyi	
6351	Taungdwingyi	
6360	Pwintphyu	
6369	Natmauk	
6421	Meikhtila	
6422	Meikhtila	
6423	Meikhtila	
6425	Meikhtila	
6426	Meikhtila	
6427	Meikhtila	
6440	Yamethin	
6450	Wundwin	
6460	Mahaling	
6469	Thaze	
6521	Minbu	
6530	Minbu New Town	
6621	Myingyan	
6622	Myingyan	
6630	Myingyan Industrial Zone	
6640	Sintkaing	
66204	Paleik	MPT
6644	Gwaykone	
6650	Kyaukse	
6660	Myittha	
6662	Kume	
6670	Taungtha	
6680	Nahtoogyi	
6721	Pyinmana	
6722	Pyinmana	
6723	Pyinmana	
6730	Lewe	
6735	Nay Pyi Taw Airport	
67340	Nay Pyi Taw	MPT
67341	Nay Pyi Taw	MPT
67342	Nay Pyi Taw	MPT
6770	Tartkone	
6775	Pyisanaung	
6821	Thayet	
6921	Aunglan	
6922	Aunglan	
7021	Hakha	
7040	Phalan	
7050	Teetain	
7121	Monywa	
7122	Monywa	
7123	Monywa	
7125	Monywa Industrial Zone	
7130	Ahlone (Monywa)	
7145	Chaungoo	
714	Myinmu	
7150	Butalin	
7155	Depeyin	
7221	Sagaing	
7222	Sagaing	
7321	Kalay	
7330	Kalay Industrial Zone	
7340	Tamu	
74252	Myitkyina	MPT
74252	Pammati	MPT
7440	Moekaung	
7442	Namtee	
7443	Namtee	
7444	Namtee	
7445	Namtee	
7446	Namtee	
7450	Bamaw	
7452	Shwegu	
7454	Mansi	
7456	Moemouk	
7460	Moenyin	
7462	Hopin	
7464	Nanmar	
7470	Pharkant	
7480	Waingmaw	
7521	Shwebo	
7522	Shwebo	
7525	Katha	
7527	Kantbalu	
7529	Indaw	
7530	Wetlet	
7540	Yeoo	
7542	Kawlin	
7549	Daze	
7550	Wintho	
7559	Kyunhla	
7560	Hteechaink	
7565	Mawlu	
7570	Khinoo	
8121	Lashio	
8121	Taunggyi	MPT
8122	Lashio	
8122	Taunggyi	MPT
8123	Lashio	
8123	Taunggyi	MPT
8124	Taunggyi	MPT
8125	Taunggyi	MPT
8127	Ayetharyar	MPT
8129	Nyaungshwe	MPT
4283	Panglong	
8140	Bahtoo	
8145	Shwenyaung	MPT
8150	Kalaw	MPT
8151	Kalaw	MPT
8152	Kalaw	MPT
8153	Kalaw	MPT
8154	Kalaw	MPT
8155	Kalaw	MPT
8160	Aungpan	MPT
8161	Aungpan	MPT
8180	Namsan	
8184	Kunhein	
82220	Lashio	MPT
82292	Lashio	MPT
82293	Lashio	MPT
8240	Kyaukme	
8251	Muse	
8252	Muse	
8253	Muse	
8254	Muse	
8261	Namkham	
8262	Kutkai	
8263	Theinne	
8265	Tarmoenye	
8267	Nanphaka	
8280	Thibaw	
8285	Naungcho	
8321	Loikaw	
8322	Loikaw	
8421	Kyaingtong	
8422	Kyaingtong	
8451	Tachileik	
8460	Minesat	
8521	Pyinoolwin	
8522	Pyinoolwin	
8523	Pyinoolwin	
8529	Padaythar Myothit (Ptinooewin)	
8540	Ohnchaw	
8550	Anee Sakhan	
8620	Mogoke	
8625	Kyatpyin	
8630	Thabeikkyin	
8635	Sintkuu	
8639	Ltpanhla	

== Format ==
- In Yangon, the format is 01 MMM MMMM.
- In Mandalay, the format is 02 MMM MMMM.
- In Nay Pyi Taw, the format is 067 MMM MMMM.
- In Maubin, the format is 045 MMM MMMM (e.g. 045307--).

== Mobile codes ==
There are four mobile operators in Myanmar.

- All mobile operators numbers are with 09 (9 without the 0 which is not used when calling from another country).
- All of them have the same format except MPT.
- Telenor, Ooredoo, and Mytel numbers have 11 digits (10 digits without the 0) with the prefix.
- Telenor start with 097.
- Ooredoo start with 099.
- Mytel start with 096.
- MecTel start with 093.
- MPT start with 092, 098, 094 or 095 (10 digits, 9 digits or 8 digits without the 0).

== Emergency numbers ==
Number	Service	Remarks
199	Police	
192	Ambulance	
191	Fire	Can also call for natural disasters
1880	Highway police	
2019	COVID-19 call center	
122	International hotline	
999	Emergency hotline	

== See also ==
- Telecommunications in Burma
