= Postal codes in Myanmar =

Postal codes in Myanmar are five digit numbers. The first two digits of the postal code denote the States, Regions, and Union Territories.

Listed below are the first 2 digits of the codes assigned to each state and region.

== States, Regions, and Union Territories ==
Flag	Name	Burmese	Postal code
	Ayeyarwady Region	ဧရာဝတီတိုင်းဒေသကြီး	10xxx
	Bago Region	ပဲခူးတိုင်းဒေသကြီး	08xxx
	Chin State	ချင်းပြည်နယ်	03xxx
	Kachin State	ကချင်ပြည်နယ်	01xxx
	Kayah State	ကယားပြည်နယ်	09xxx
	Kayin State	ကရင်ပြည်နယ်	13xxx
	Magway Region	မကွေးတိုင်းဒေသကြီး	04xxx
	Mandalay Region	မန္တလေးတိုင်းဒေသကြီး	05xxx
	Mon State	မွန်ပြည်နယ်	12xxx
	Rakhine State	ရခိုင်ပြည်နယ်	07xxx
	Shan State	ရှမ်းပြည်နယ်	06111
	Sagaing Region	စစ်ကိုင်းတိုင်းဒေသကြီး	02xxx
	Tanintharyi Region	တနင်္သာရီတိုင်းဒေသကြီး	14xxx
	Yangon Region	ရန်ကုန်တိုင်းဒေသကြီး	11xxx
	Naypyidaw Union Territory	နေပြည်တော် ပြည်ထောင်စုနယ်မြေ	15xxx
