= List of bridges in Myanmar =

This is a list of bridges in Myanmar.

== Major bridges ==
	Name	Burmese	Span	Length	Type	Carries Crosses	Opened	Location	Division	Ref.
1	New Zar Tha Pyin Bridge	ဂျိုင်းတံတား (ဇာသပြင်)	460 m (1,510 ft)	880 m (2,890 ft)	Cable-stayed; Steel box girder deck, concrete pylons 210+460+210	Mawlamyine–Hpa An Highway; Gyaing River	2025	Zar Tha Pyin–Kalagon; 16°33′50.0″N 97°43′57.3″E	Mon	
2	Zar Tha Pyin Bridge	ဂျိုင်းတံတား (ဇာသပြင်)	457 m (1,499 ft)	882 m (2,894 ft)	Suspension; Steel truss deck, steel pylons	Mawlamyine–Hpa An Highway; Gyaing River	1999	Zar Tha Pyin–Kalagon; 16°33′50.0″N 97°43′56.4″E	Mon	
3	Dala Bridge under construction	ဒလတံတား	370 m (1,210 ft)	1,872.5 m (6,143 ft)	Cable-stayed; Concrete beam deck, concrete pylons	Road bridge Yangon River	2025	Yangon–Dala Township; 16°46′09.9″N 96°08′38.0″E	Yangon Region	(Note: Also called Korea-Myanmar Friendship Bridge.)
4	Goteik Bridge project		360 m (1,180 ft)	875 m (2,871 ft)	Cable-stayed; Concrete beam deck, concrete pylons	Mandalay–Muse Highway; Gohtwin Stream		Nawnghkio; 22°20′23.4″N 96°52′00.5″E	Shan	
5	Yar Yamaung Bridge	ရာမောင်တံတား	305 m (1,001 ft)	405 m (1,329 ft)	Suspension; Steel	Road bridge Lemro River	1999	Minbya; 20°23′58.4″N 93°19′32.4″E	Rakhine	
6	Leinli Bridge	လိန်းလီကြိုးတံတား	305 m (1,001 ft)	536 m (1,759 ft)	Suspension; Steel truss deck, steel pylons	Naypyitaw and Pinlaung Road; Paung Laung River	2010	Talaingma; 19°59′28.3″N 96°36′58.1″E	Shan	
7	Aung Zeya Bridge	အောင်ဇေယျတံတား	300 m (980 ft)	1,154 m (3,786 ft)	Cable-stayed; Steel truss deck, concrete pylons 141+300+141	Hlaing River Road; Yangon River	2000	Yangon; 16°52′49.3″N 96°05′13.3″E	Yangon Region	
8	Pathein Bridge	ပုသိမ်ကြိုးတံတား	268 m (879 ft)	660 m (2,170 ft)	Suspension; Steel truss deck, steel pylons	Road bridge Pathein River	2004	Pathein; 16°49′27.5″N 94°43′57.0″E	Ayeyarwady	
9	Twante Bridge	တွံတေးတံတား	263 m (863 ft)	1,095 m (3,593 ft)	Suspension; Steel truss deck, steel pylons	Road bridge Twante Canal	2006	Twante Township; 16°43′52.9″N 96°01′28.3″E	Yangon Region	
10	Irrawaddy Bridge	ဧရာဝတီတံတား (ရတနာပုံ)	224 m (735 ft)(x3)	1,711 m (5,614 ft)	Arch; Steel through truss arch 2x112+3x224+2x112	National Highway 7 Irrawaddy River	2008	Sagaing–Amarapura; 21°52′36.5″N 95°59′45.8″E	Sagaing; Mandalay	(Note: Also called Ayeyarwady Bridge or Yadanabon Bridge.)
11	Bago River Bridge	ပဲခူးမြစ်တံတား	224 m (735 ft)	2,031 m (6,663 ft)	Cable-stayed; 112+224+112	Road bridge Bago River	2024	Yangon–Thanlyin; 16°47′24.1″N 96°13′57.1″E	Yangon Region	
12	New Attaran Bridge under construction	အတ္တရံတံတား	190 m (620 ft)	780 m (2,560 ft)	Extradosed; Composite steel/concrete box girder deck, concrete pylons 120+190+120	Mawlamyine–Hpa An Highway; Ataran River		Mawlamyine; 16°28′25.4″N 97°40′15.6″E	Mon	
13	Myaungmya River Bridge collapsed in 2018	မြောင်းမြတံတား	183 m (600 ft)	387 m (1,270 ft)	Suspension; Steel truss deck, steel pylons	Myaung Road; Myaungmya River	1996	Myaungmya; 16°35′59.7″N 94°56′45.8″E	Ayeyarwady	
14	Labutta Bridge dismantled in 2019	လပွတ္တာ တံတား	183 m (600 ft)	396 m (1,299 ft)	Suspension; Steel truss deck, steel pylons 4x15+183+4x15	Road bridge Pinlellay River	1998	Htônbo; 16°23′45.2″N 94°50′11.6″E	Ayeyarwady	
15	Myittha Bridge	မြစ်သာတံတား(ကလေးဝ)၊	183 m (600 ft)	400 m (1,300 ft)	Suspension; Steel truss deck, steel pylons	Monywa–Kalewa Highway; Myittha River	2004	Kalewa; 23°11′47.2″N 94°17′29.3″E	Sagaing	
16	Attaran Bridge	အတ္တရံတံတား	182 m (597 ft)	432 m (1,417 ft)	Cable-stayed; Steel deck and pylons	Road bridge Ataran River	1998	Mawlamyine; 16°28′25.0″N 97°40′16.5″E	Mon	
17	New Gyaing Bridge (Kawkareik)	ဂျိုင်း-ကော့ကရိတ် တံတား	180 m (590 ft)	580 m (1,900 ft)	Extradosed; Composite steel/concrete box girder deck, concrete pylons 100+180+100	National Highway 85; Asian Highway 1 Hlaingbwe River	2023	Gyaing; 16°36′27.9″N 98°00′28.0″E	Kayin	
18	Panmawaday Bridge dismantled in 2022	ပမ္မဝတီတံတား	162 m (531 ft)	378 m (1,240 ft)	Suspension; Steel truss deck, steel pylons	Myaungmya Road	2004	Myaungmya; 16°42′09.4″N 94°54′38.9″E	Ayeyarwady	(Note: The bridge was replaced by a steel box girder bridge with new intermediate piles in 2022.)
19	Gyaing Bridge (Kawkareik)	ဂျိုင်း-ကော့ကရိတ် တံတား	154 m (505 ft)	385 m (1,263 ft)	Suspension; Steel truss deck, steel pylons	National Highway 85; Asian Highway 1 Hlaingbwe River	1999	Gyaing; 16°36′26.6″N 98°00′27.9″E	Kayin	
20	Irrawaddy Bridge (Thayet-Aunglan) under construction	ဧရာဝတီတံတား (အောင်လံ-သရက်)၊	144 m (472 ft)(x12)	2,272 m (7,454 ft)	Arch; Steel through truss arch	Road bridge Irrawaddy River	2026	Thayet–Aunglan; 19°21′14.9″N 95°11′52.4″E	Magway	
21	Bogyoke Aung San bridge	ဗိုလ်ချုပ်အောင်ဆန်းတံတား (ဘီလူးကျွန်း	140 m (460 ft)(x2)	1,586 m (5,203 ft)	Arch; Steel through truss arch	Road bridge Salween River	2017	Mawlamyine–Bilu Island; 16°26′26.3″N 97°36′33.9″E	Mon	
22	Myaungmya River Bridge (2019)	မြောင်းမြတံတား	140 m (460 ft)	830 m (2,720 ft)	Truss; Steel deck truss 75+140+75	Myaung Road; Myaungmya River	2019	Myaungmya; 16°35′59.7″N 94°56′44.9″E	Ayeyarwady	
23	Pathein 2 Bridge	ပုသိမ်တံတားအမှတ်(၂)	140 m (460 ft)	725 m (2,379 ft)	Arch; Steel tied arch Bow-string bridge 95+140+95	Road bridge Pathein River	2020	Pathein; 16°46′59.2″N 94°43′42.9″E	Ayeyarwady	
24	Maha Bandula Bridge	မဟာဗန္ဓုလတံတား	130 m (430 ft)	1,110 m (3,640 ft)	Cable-stayed; Steel Truss deck, concrete pylons 55+130+55	Maha Bandula Road; Pazundaung Creek	2000	Yangon; 16°46′37.0″N 96°10′59.7″E	Yangon Region	
25	Bayint Naung Bridge	ဘုရင့်နောင်တံတား အမှတ်	123 m (404 ft)(x3)	500 m (1,600 ft)	Truss; Steel; 66+123x3+66	Yangon-Pathein Road; Yangon River	1994	Yangon; 16°51′22.6″N 96°05′52.6″E	Yangon Region	
26	Tha Yu-Pa Bridge	သယုချောင်း(ပဲပဒုံ)တံတား	122 m (400 ft)	122 m (400 ft)	Suspension; Steel	Min Bu-Ann Road	2010	Ann; 19°47′47.7″N 94°03′23.7″E	Rakhine	
27	Bayint Naung Bridge 2	ဘုရင့်နောင်တံတား အမှတ် (၂)	122 m (400 ft)(x3)	1,262 m (4,140 ft)	Truss; Steel	Yangon-Pathein Road; Yangon River	2014	Yangon; 16°51′24.8″N 96°05′51.4″E	Yangon Region	
28	Attaran Bridge (Sapall Ngull)	အတ္ထရံတံတား(စံပယ်ဂူ)	121 m (397 ft)	644 m (2,113 ft)	Arch; Steel tied arch Bow-string bridge	Kyaikmaraw Road; Ataran River	2020	Kyaikmaraw; 16°22′39.3″N 97°46′37.4″E	Mon	
29	Maubin Bridge		120 m (390 ft)(x4)	700 m (2,300 ft)	Truss; Steel; 120x4	Road bridge Myitmaka River	1988	Ma-ubin; 16°44′58.9″N 95°39′14.2″E	Ayeyarwady	
30	Bomyatun Bridge	ဗိုလ်မြတ်ထွန်း တံတား	120 m (390 ft)(x14)	2,604 m (8,543 ft)	Truss; Steel; 96+120x14+96	Yangon-Pathein Road; Irrawaddy River	1999	Nyaungdon; 17°02′01.7″N 95°33′23.4″E	Ayeyarwady	
31	Shwe Pyithar Bridge		120 m (390 ft)(x3)	528 m (1,732 ft)	Truss; Steel; 84+120x3+84	Khayae Pin Road; Yangon River	2001	Yangon; 16°55′33.1″N 96°04′30.0″E	Yangon Region	
32	Irrawaddy Bridge (Magway)	ဧရာဝတီတံတား(မကွေး)	120 m (390 ft)(x16)	2,740 m (8,990 ft)	Truss; Steel	Road bridge Irrawaddy River	2002	Magway; 20°08′50.9″N 94°54′25.2″E	Magway	
33	Irrawaddy Bridge (Nyaungdon)	ဧရာဝတီတံတား (ညောင်တုန်း)	120 m (390 ft)(x16)	6,262 m (20,545 ft)	Truss; Steel	Road-rail bridge Irrawaddy River	2011	Nyaungdon; 17°02′23.7″N 95°34′41.4″E	Ayeyarwady	(Note: The Irrawaddy Bridge at Nyaungdon is a mixed road / rail bridge which has a common part over the river, the two tracks branch off on either side of the central structure. The road section measures a total of 3,296 meters, the rail section 6,262 meters and the main truss structure 2,256 meters.)
34	Pakokku Bridge	ဧရာဝတီတံတား (ပခုက္ကူ)	120 m (390 ft)(x23)	6,278 m (20,597 ft)	Truss; Steel; Railroad bridge 100+19x120+5x100 +4x120+100	India–Myanmar–Thailand Trilateral Highway; Railway bridge Irrawaddy River	2012	Pakokku; 21°17′52.8″N 95°03′37.3″E	Magway	(Note: The Irrawaddy Bridge at Pakokku is a mixed road / rail bridge which has a common part over the river, the two tracks branch off on either side of the central structure. The road section measures a total of 4,126 meters, the rail section 6,278 meters and the main truss structure 3,484 meters.)
35	Second Myanmar–Lao Friendship Bridge	မြန်မာ−လာအို ချစ်ကြည်ရေး မဲခေါင်မြစ်ကူးတံတား	120 m (390 ft)(x3)	691 m (2,267 ft)	Truss; Steel	Mekong	2015	Kenglat–Xieng Kok; 20°52′15.0″N 100°32′31.1″E	Shan; Laos	
36	Ava Bridge	အင်းဝတံတား	112 m (367 ft)(x9)	1,207 m (3,960 ft)	Truss; Steel; Railroad bridge	Imphal–Sagaing Road; Mandalay–Monywa railway Mandalay–Myitkyina railway Irrawaddy River	1934	Sagaing–Amarapura; 21°52′18.4″N 95°59′30.6″E	Sagaing; Mandalay	(Note: The Ava Bridge (also called Inn Wa Bridge or Inwa Bridge) was the only bridge spanning the 2,200 kilometres (1,400 mi) of the Irrawaddy River in Myanmar until the 1990s.)
37	Sittaung Bridge (Theinzayat)	စစ်တောင်းတံတား (သိမ်ဇရပ်)	112 m (367 ft)(x6)	716 m (2,349 ft)	Truss; Steel; 120x6	Old Mawlamyaing Road; Railway bridge Sittaung River	1961	Waw Township–Theinzayat; 17°31′08.0″N 96°52′29.9″E	Bago; Mon	
38	Thanlyin Bridge	သန်လျင် တံတား	112 m (367 ft)(x10)	1,808 m (5,932 ft)	Truss; Steel; 104+112x10+104	Road-rail bridge Bago River	1993	Yangon–Thanlyin; 16°47′25.4″N 96°13′59.2″E	Yangon Region	(Note: The Thanlyin Bridge is a mixed road / rail bridge which has a common part over the river, the two tracks branch off on either side of the central structure. The road section measures a total of 2,151 meters, the rail section 2,938 meters and the main truss structure 1,808 meters.)
39	Thanlwin Bridge (Mawlamyine)	သံလွင်တံတား(မော်လမြိုင်)	112 m (367 ft)(x21)	6,596 m (21,640 ft)	Truss; Steel	National Highway 8 Bago-Dawei line Salween River	2005	Mawlamyine–Mottama; 16°30′39.1″N 97°37′05.3″E	Mon	(Note: The Thanlwin Bridge is a mixed road / rail bridge which has a common part over the river, the two tracks branch off on either side of the central structure. The road section measures a total of 3,528 meters, the rail section 6,596 meters and the main truss structure 2,347 meters.)
40	Malun Bridge	ဧရာဝတီတံတား (မလွန်)	112 m (367 ft)(x7)	980 m (3,220 ft)	Truss; Steel; 96+112x7+96	Road-rail bridge Irrawaddy River	2012	Malun; 19°54′05.2″N 95°04′58.7″E	Bago	
41	Ngawun Bridge		110 m (360 ft)	335 m (1,099 ft)	Box girder Prestressed concrete 77+110+77	Pathein-Monywa Road; Pathein River	1991	Ngathaingchaung; 17°23′19.0″N 95°03′49.0″E	Ayeyarwady	
42	Sittaung Bridge (Moppalin)	စစ်တောင်းတံတား (မုပ္ပလင်)	104 m (341 ft)(x4)	729 m (2,392 ft)	Truss; Steel	National Highway 8 Sittaung River	2008	Waw Township–Moppalin; 17°31′08.0″N 96°52′29.9″E	Bago; Mon	
43	Thuwunna Bridge		100 m (330 ft)	300 m (980 ft)	Box girder Prestressed concrete 70+100+70	Road bridge Pazundaung Creek	1985	Yangon; 16°48′36.8″N 96°11′32.4″E	Yangon Region	
44	New Thaketa Bridge	သာကေတတံတားသစ်	100 m (330 ft)	253 m (830 ft)	Extradosed; Concrete box girder deck, concrete pylons 60+100+60	Road bridge Pazundaung Creek	2018	Yangon; 16°47′07.2″N 96°10′45.2″E	Yangon Region	
45	Dedaye Bridge	ဒေးဒရဲတံတား		1,246 m (4,088 ft)	Truss; Steel	Road bridge Irrawaddy River	2003	Dedaye Township–Kungyangon Township; 16°24′47.8″N 95°53′24.9″E	Ayeyarwady; Yangon Region	
46	Anawrahta Bridge	အနော်ရထာ တံတား		1,582 m (5,190 ft)	Truss; Steel	Road bridge Irrawaddy River	2001	Chauk–Seikphyu; 20°53′45.6″N 94°48′30.4″E	Magway	
47	Thanlwin Bridge (Hpa-An)	သံလွင်တံတား (ဘားအံ)		686 m (2,251 ft)	Truss; Steel	National Highway 85; Salween River	1997	Hpa-an; 16°50′29.7″N 97°36′40.1″E	Kayin	
48	Kunlong Bridge	ကွမ်းလုံတံတား	100 m (330 ft)	241 m (791 ft)	Suspension; Steel truss deck, concrete pylons	National Highway 34; Salween River	1965	Kunlong; 23°24′37.4″N 98°38′32.5″E	Shan	

== List by state ==
- Ayeyarwady Division
  - Kyungon Bridge
  - Thegon Bridge
  - Sonegone Bridge
- Bago Division
  - Nawaday Bridge
- Kachin State
  - Bala Min Htin Bridge
- Kayah State
  - Thanlwin Bridge (Hpasawng) (Hpasawng Bridge)
- Chin State
  - Kettel Bridge
- Mon State
  - Thanlwin Bridge (Mawlamyaing)
- Rakhine State
  - Ramong Bridge
  - Thazintan Pauk Bridge
- Sagaing Division
  - Hsinbyushin Bridge
  - Monywa Bridge
- Shan State
  - Tahsan Bridge
  - Takawet Bridge
  - Second Myanmar-Thailand Friendship Bridge (Kenglat)
- Yangon Division
  - Bayinnaung Bridge
  - Dagon Bridge
  - Ngamoyeik Bridge
  - Shwepyitha Bridge
  - Dala bridge

== Historical and architectural interest bridges ==
	Name	Burmese	Distinction	Length	Type	Carries Crosses	Opened	Location	Division	Ref.
1	U Bein Bridge	ဦးပိန် တံတား	Longest teak bridge in the world	1,200 m (3,900 ft)	Trestle; Wood	Footbridge; Taungthaman Lake	1851	Amarapura; 21°53′29.1″N 96°03′21.8″E	Mandalay	
2	Goteik viaduct	ဂုတ်ထိပ်တံတား	Highest bridge in Myanmar; Height : 102 m (335 ft)	689 m (2,260 ft)	Trestle; Steel	Railway bridge Gohtwin Stream	1901	Nawnghkio; 22°20′35.5″N 96°51′33.8″E	Shan	

== See also ==
- Transport in Myanmar
- Rail transport in Myanmar
- List of crossings of the Mekong River
- Geography of Myanmar
- List of rivers of Myanmar

== Notes and references ==
- Notes
- Nicolas Janberg. "International Database for Civil and Structural Engineering". Structurae.com.
- Others references
