= Attaran Bridge =

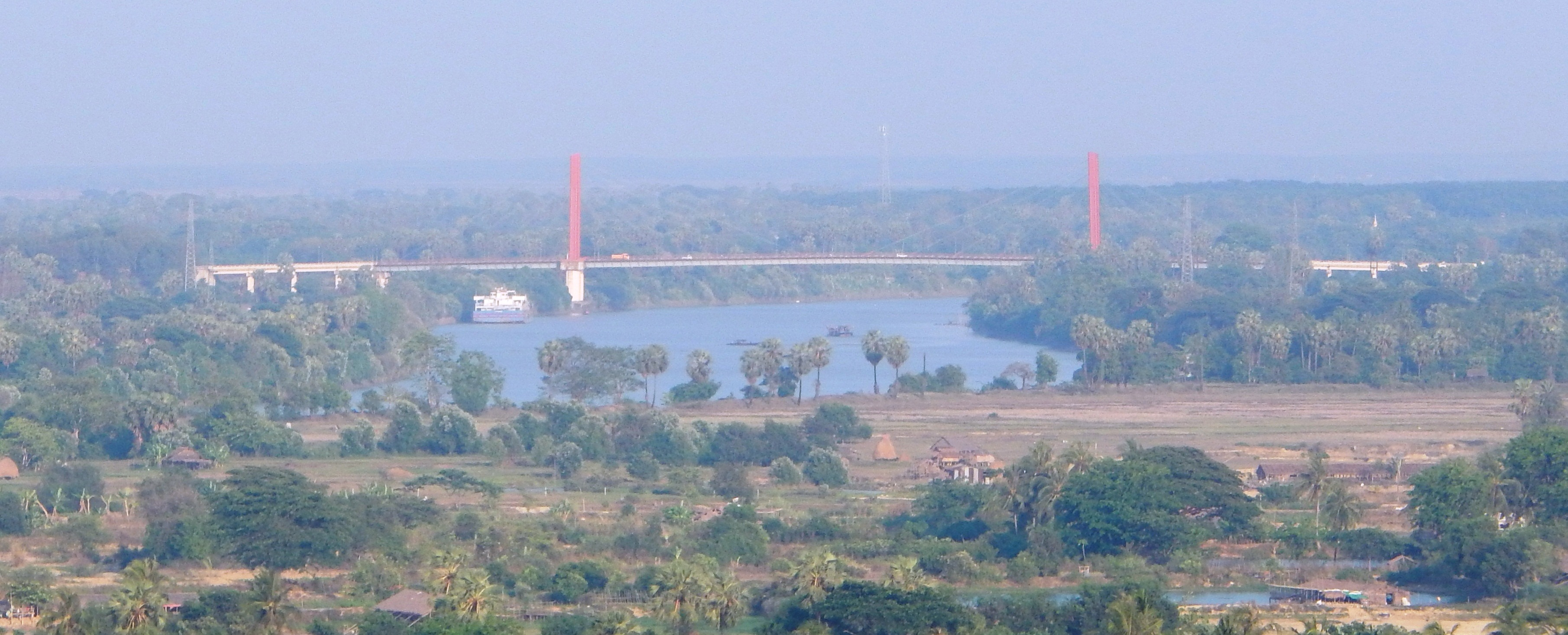
- Coordinates: 16°28′25″N 97°40′16″E
- Carries: 2 lanes, 2 pedestrian walk lanes
- Crosses: Ataran River
- Locale: Mawlamyine and Zartapyin
- Official name: Attaran Bridge
- Maintained by: Ministry of Transportation

Characteristics
- Design: Cable-stayed bridge
- Total length: 1,420 ft (430 m)
- Width: 2 traffic lanes, 2 pedestrian walk lanes
- Longest span: 590 ft (180 m)

History
- Construction end: 1998
- Opened: March 1998

Statistics
- Daily traffic: unknown
- Toll: unknown

Attaran Bridge (Burmese: အတ္တရံတံတား) is a bridge in the township of Mawlamyine, in the Mon State of Burma. It is suspended by steel cable with a reinforced concrete foundation. It is 1,420 feet (430 m) long and 24 feet (7.3 m) wide and was reported to have cost K 580.6 million. The bridge was established as part of infrastructural projects (Sittoung Bridge, Kataik Dam Project, etc.) to develop Mon State socio-economically.

Attaran Bridge was formally opened in March 1998 on the 53rd Anniversary Armed Forces Day, with an address by the chairman of the Work Committee for Development of Border Areas and National Races Secretary, Lieutenant General Khin Nyunt.
