= Thandi =

Thandi may refer to:

- Thandi (name), including a list of people with the name
- Thandi (rhinoceros), the name of a rhinoceros that survived being poached
- Thandi River, in Myanmar
