= Sittaung =

Sittaung (also spelled Sittang and Sittoung) may refer to:

- Sittaung, Mon, a village and historical site in Mon State, Myanmar
- Sittaung, Sagaing, a town in Sagaing Region, Myanmar
- Sittaung Bridge (Moppalin), a bridge over the Sittaung river in Mon State, Myanmar
- Sittaung River, a river in Myanmar
- Sittaung Temple or Shite-thaung, a temple in Mrauk U, Myanmar
