= Thandie =

Thandie is a given name. Notable people with the name include:

== People ==
- Thandie Galleta (born 1993), Malawian netball player
- Thandiwe Newton (born 1972), English actress formerly credited as Thandie Newton

== Fictional characters ==
- Thandie Abebe, character on the British medical drama Holby City

== See also ==
- Thandi (disambiguation)
- Thandi (name), a given name
- Thandiwe, a given name
