= Winyaw River =

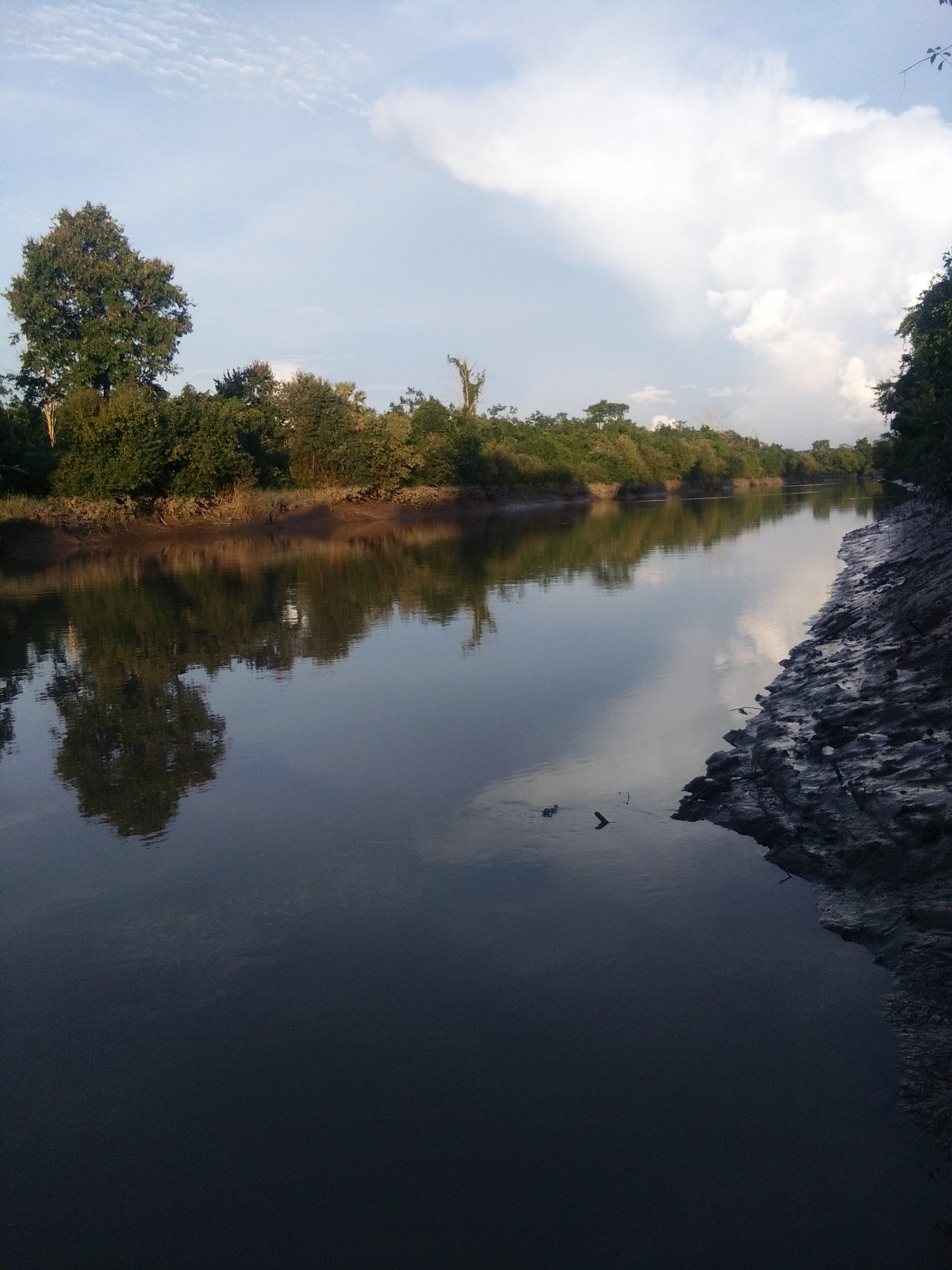
- On the west bank of Winyaw River just after looking back towards transl. Kawankathaung.
- Native name: ဝင်းရော်မြစ် (Burmese)

Location
- Country: Myanmar

Physical characteristics
- Mouth
  - location: Ataran River
  - coordinates: 27°46′16″N 85°25′38″E
  - elevation: 17 m (56 ft)

Basin features
- Tributaries
  - left: Phabya Chaung, Kyungawon Chaung
- Waterbodies: Tenasserim Range
- Bridges: Winyaw-Seikkyi Bridge

The Winyaw River (Burmese: ဝင်းရော်မြစ်) is a river in southern part of Myanmar. It originates in Tenasserim Range and empties into the Ataran River at the village of Chaunghanakwa. Death Railway crosses the river near Anankwin village.

== See also ==
- List of rivers of Myanmar
