= Thandi (name) =

Thandi is a given name. Notable people with the name include:

== Given name ==
- Thandi Brewer, South African television actress
- Thandi Klaasen (1931–2017), South African jazz singer
- Thandi Modise (born 1959), South African politician
- Thandi Ndlovu (c. 1954–2019), South African medical doctor and businesswoman
- Thandi Orleyn (born 1956), South African lawyer
- Thandi Phoenix (born 1993), Australian singer-songwriter
- Thandi Sibisi (born 1986), South African art gallery owner and former model
- Thandi Shongwe (born 1962), South African politician
- Thandi Tshabalala (born 1984), South African cricketer

== Surname ==
- Karman Thandi (born 1998), Indian tennis player
- Simranjit Thandi (born 1999), English footballer

== See also ==
- Thandi (rhinoceros)
- Thandie, a given name
- Thandiwe, a given name
