= Caelatoglanis =

Scientific classification
- Kingdom: Animalia
- Phylum: Chordata
- Class: Actinopterygii
- Order: Siluriformes
- Family: Sisoridae
- Genus: Caelatoglanis; H. H. Ng & Kottelat, 2005
- Species: C. zonatus

Binomial name
- Caelatoglanis zonatus H. H. Ng & Kottelat, 2005

Species of fish

Caelatoglanis zonatus is a species of catfish (order Siluriformes) of the family Erethistidae. It is the only member of the monotypic genus Caelatoglanis.

This species originates from the Ataran River drainage in Myanmar.

This genus and species is distinguished by its plicate (pleated) upper lip. It has a short thoracic adhesive apparatus that is not much longer than it is broad; it consists of longitudinal pleats of skin. It also has serrations on the pectoral fin spine on the anterior that point toward the tip of the spine, as well as serrations on the posterior edge. It has wide gill openings. This species reaches a length of 3.9 centimetres (1.5 in) SL.
