= Kyainseikgyi =

Kyainseikgyi ကြာအင်းဆိပ်ကြီး
- Town
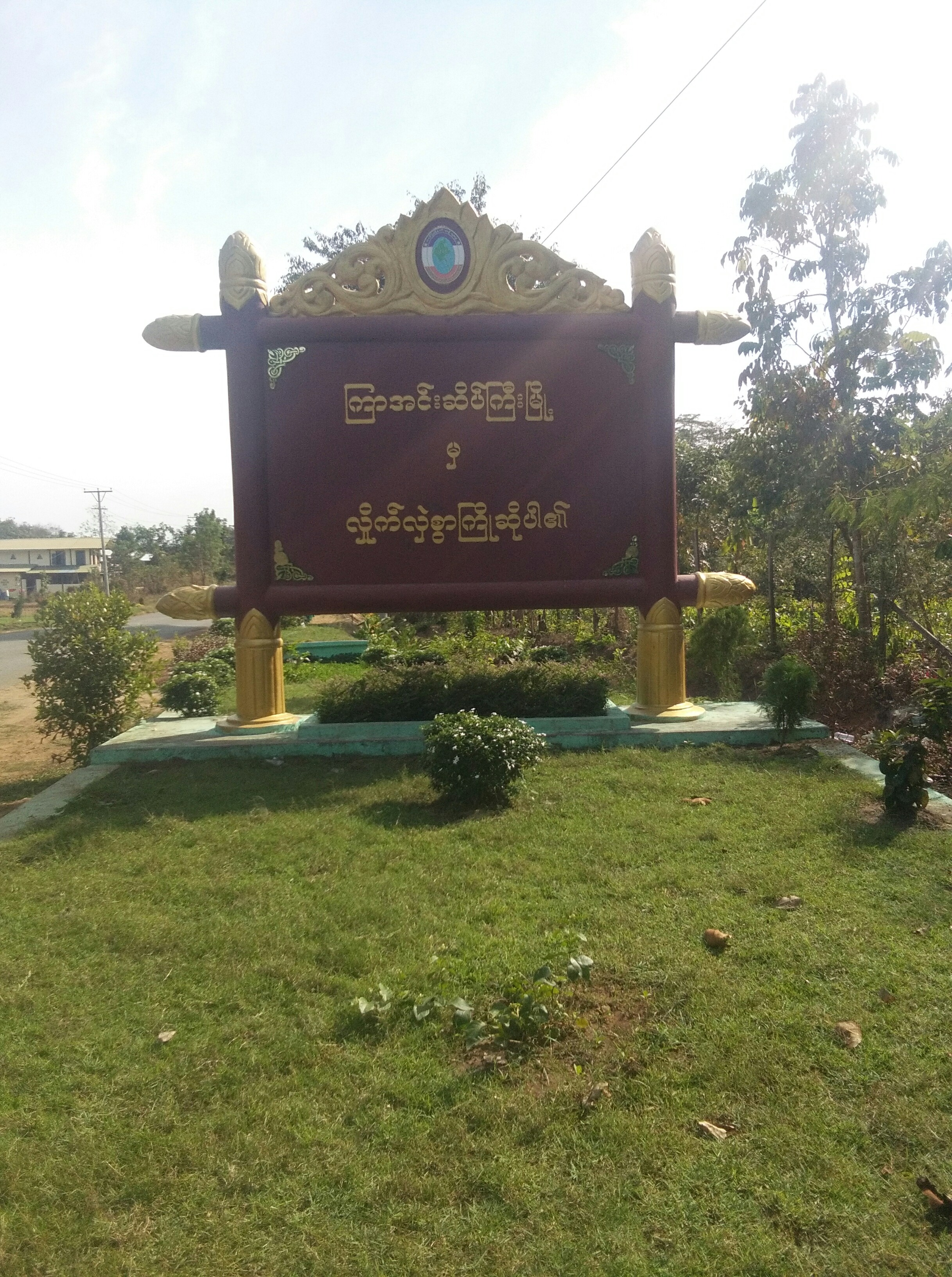

- Location in Myanmar (Burma)
- Coordinates: 16°2′0″N 98°8′0″E
- Country: Myanmar
- Division: Kayin State
- District: Kyain Seikgyi District
- Township: Kyain Seikgyi Township
- Elevation: 62 ft (19 m)

Population (2014)
  - Total: 4,428
  - Religions: Buddhism and Christianity
- Time zone: UTC+6.30 (MMT)
- Area code: 58

Kyainseikgyi (Pwo Eastern Karen: ဍုံလာ့တ်ုကဝ်သၞေဝ်ဖါဍောဟ်; Burmese: ကြာအင်းဆိပ်ကြီးမြို့; pronounced [tɕàʔɪ́ɰ̃sʰeɪ̯ʔtɕí mjo̰]; Mon: ဍုၚ်လှာဒကှ်) is a town in Kayin State, Myanmar (Burma), located on the eastern side of the Zami River. It is the administrative center of the Kyain Seikgyi Township.
