= List of rivers of Myanmar =

This is a list of rivers in Myanmar (also known as Burma).

This list is arranged by drainage basin from east to west, with respective tributaries indented under each larger stream's name.

== Bay of Bengal ==
- Nāf River
- Kaladan River
- Lemro River
- Mayu River
- Kaleindaung River
- Pyanmalot River (Pyamalaw River)
- Irrawaddy River (Ayeyarwady River)
  - Lai Za Stream
    - Mung Lai Stream
  - Yin River
  - Mon River
  - Yaw River
    - Kyaw River
  - Chindwin River
    - Myittha River
      - Manipur River
    - Uyu River
    - Tizu River
  - Mu River
  - Myitnge River
    - Zawgyi River
  - Shweli River
  - Taping River
  - N'Mai River
  - Mali River
  - Pathein River (Bassein River) (Ngawun River)
    - A-thút
    - Dagā River
  - Yangon River (Rangoon River) (Hlaing River)
    - Thandi River
  - Myitmaka River
- Bago River (Pegu River)
- Sittaung River
  - Phyu Creek
  - Kha Paung Creek
  - Sinthay River
  - Paunglaung River
- Salween River (Thanlwin River)
  - Ataran River
    - Zami River
    - Winyaw River
  - Gyaing River
    - Haungtharaw River
  - Yunzalin River
  - Moei River (Thaungyin River)
  - Pawn River
    - Pilu River
  - Pai River
  - Teng River
  - Hsim River
  - Nam Pang River
  - Nanding River
- Ye River
- Heinze River
- Dawei River (Tavoy River)
- Great Tenasserim River (Tanintharyi River)
- Lenya River
- Kraburi River (Pakchan River)
- Dapein River
- Tarpein River
- Paung Laung River
- Chaungmagyi River

== South China Sea ==
- Mekong
  - Kok River
  - Ruak River
  - Loi River
