= Myaungmya River Bridge =

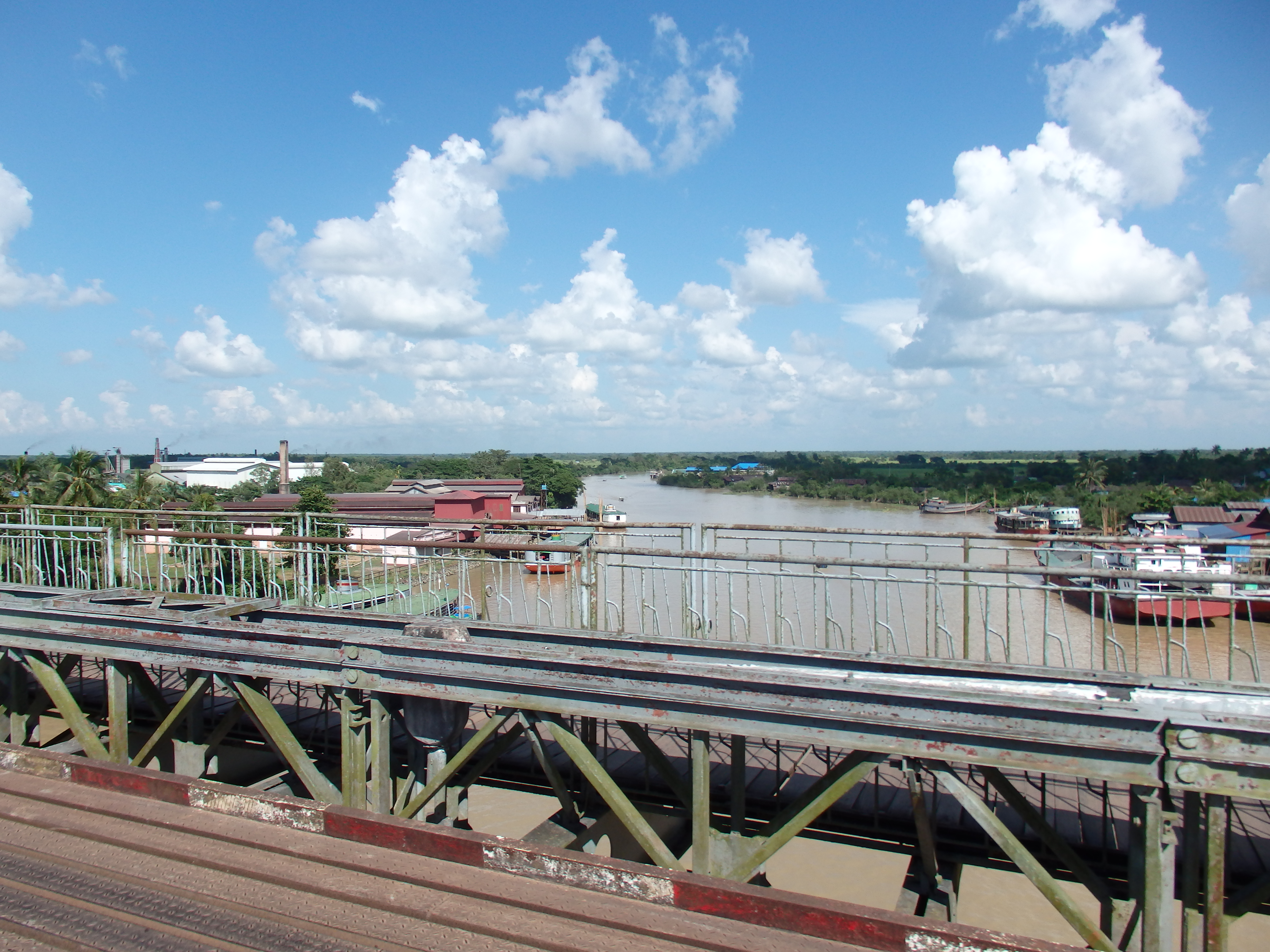
- Coordinates: 16°36′0.10″N 94°56′45.51″E
- Carried: Motor vehicles, pedestrians and bicycles
- Crossed: Myaungmya River
- Locale: Ayeyarwady, Myanmar
- Maintained by: Public Works Department

Characteristics
- Total length: 387 metres (1,270 ft)
- Longest span: 183 metres (600 ft)

History
- Opened: 1996
- Collapsed: 1 April 2018

Myaungmya River Bridge was a suspension bridge in Ayeyarwady, Myanmar. Construction started in 1994, and the bridge was opened in 1996. It collapsed on 1 April 2018.

== Bridge failure ==
The Ministry of Construction cited that the failure was due to the rusting of the suspension cable, which eventually broke, falling into the river below along with an 18-ton truck, killing two. The bridge was inspected monthly after it turned 20 years old in 2016.

After the bridge collapsed, the regional government arranged two ferries to carry cars and passengers across the river. The construction of a new bridge started in December 2018 and was originally scheduled to be completed in 2020.

== See also ==
- List of bridges in Myanmar
