= Pakokku Bridge =

Longest Bridge of Myanmar

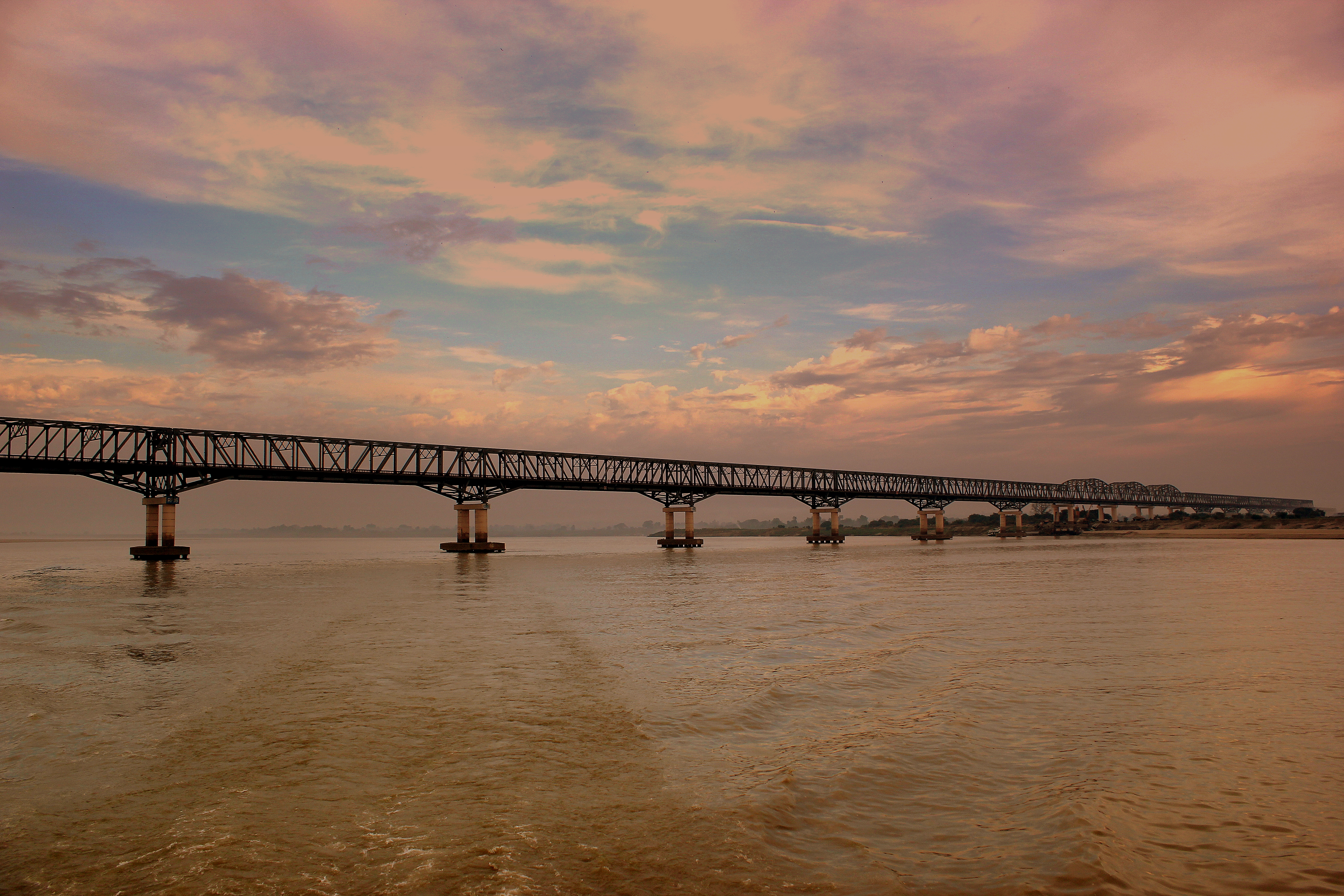
- Pakokku Bridge over the Irrawaddy River
- Coordinates: 21°18′2.8″N 95°3′37″E
- Carries: Motor vehicles, Trains
- Crosses: Irrawaddy River

History
- Designer: Crown Advanced Construction, Myanmar Ministry of Construction
- Construction start: 2009
- Construction end: 31 December 2011
- Opened: 1 January 2012

Pakokku Bridge is a rail and road bridge across the Irrawaddy River in Myanmar's Pakokku town. The main bridge is 3.4 km (2.1 mi) long with the motorway measuring 4 km (2.5 mi) and the railroad measuring 6.17 km (3.83 mi). The bridge is part of the India–Myanmar–Thailand Trilateral Highway and is the longest bridge in Myanmar.

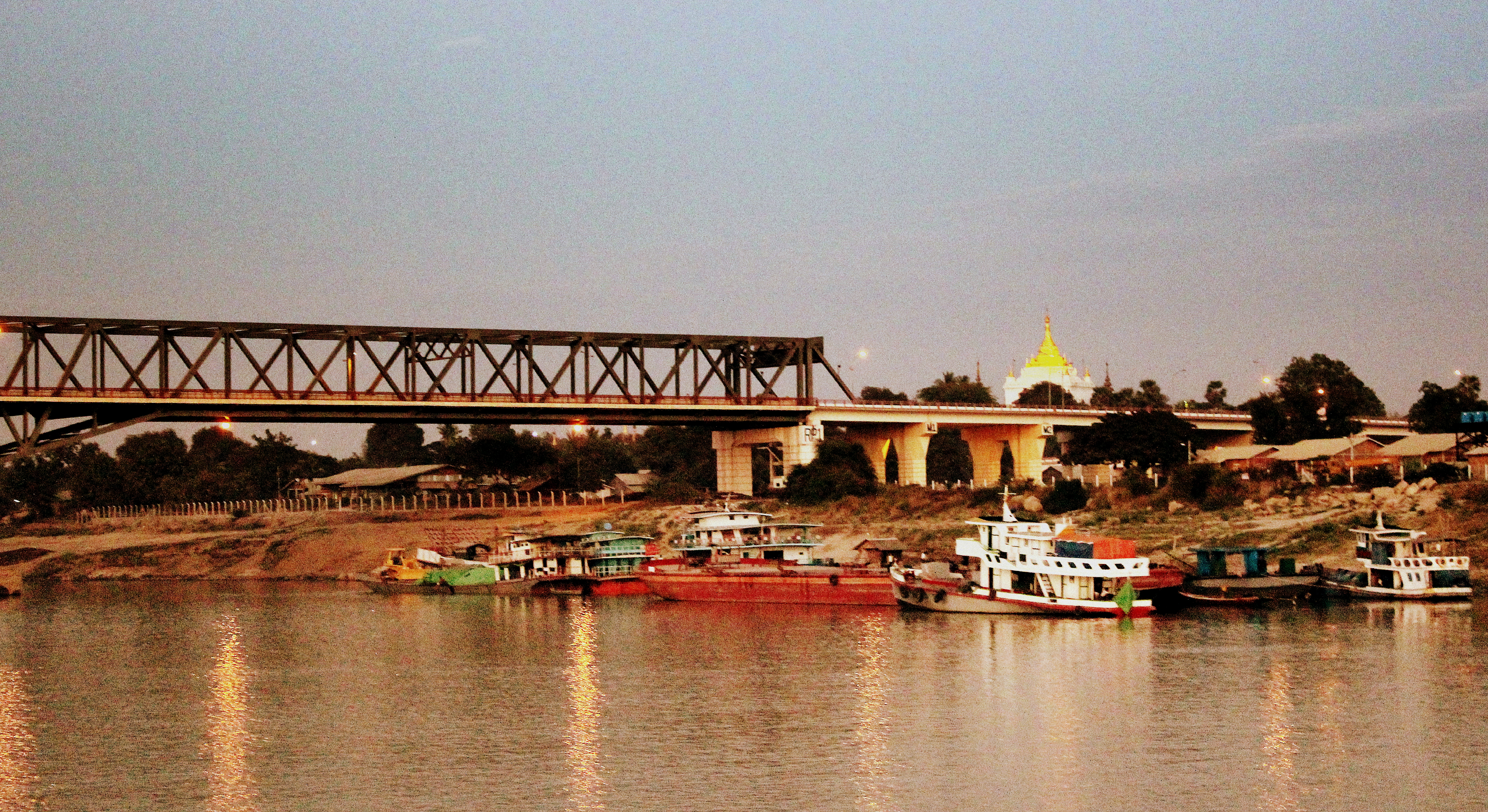
The bridge as seen during the ferry journey from Bagan to Mandalay.

== Construction ==
The bridge connects the town of Pakokku with the administrative district of Nyaung-U. The bridge has a 28 foot wide motorway and a 14 foot wide roadway in parallel besides two pedestrian walkways measuring three foot and three inches. It is a broad crested type bridge with a 52 foot high and 262 feet wide clearance area. The bridge also has a 512 feet long approach bridge and an 850 feet long approach embankment. The bridge was inaugurated on 1 January 2012 by Vice-president Tin Aung Myint Oo.

== Gallery ==
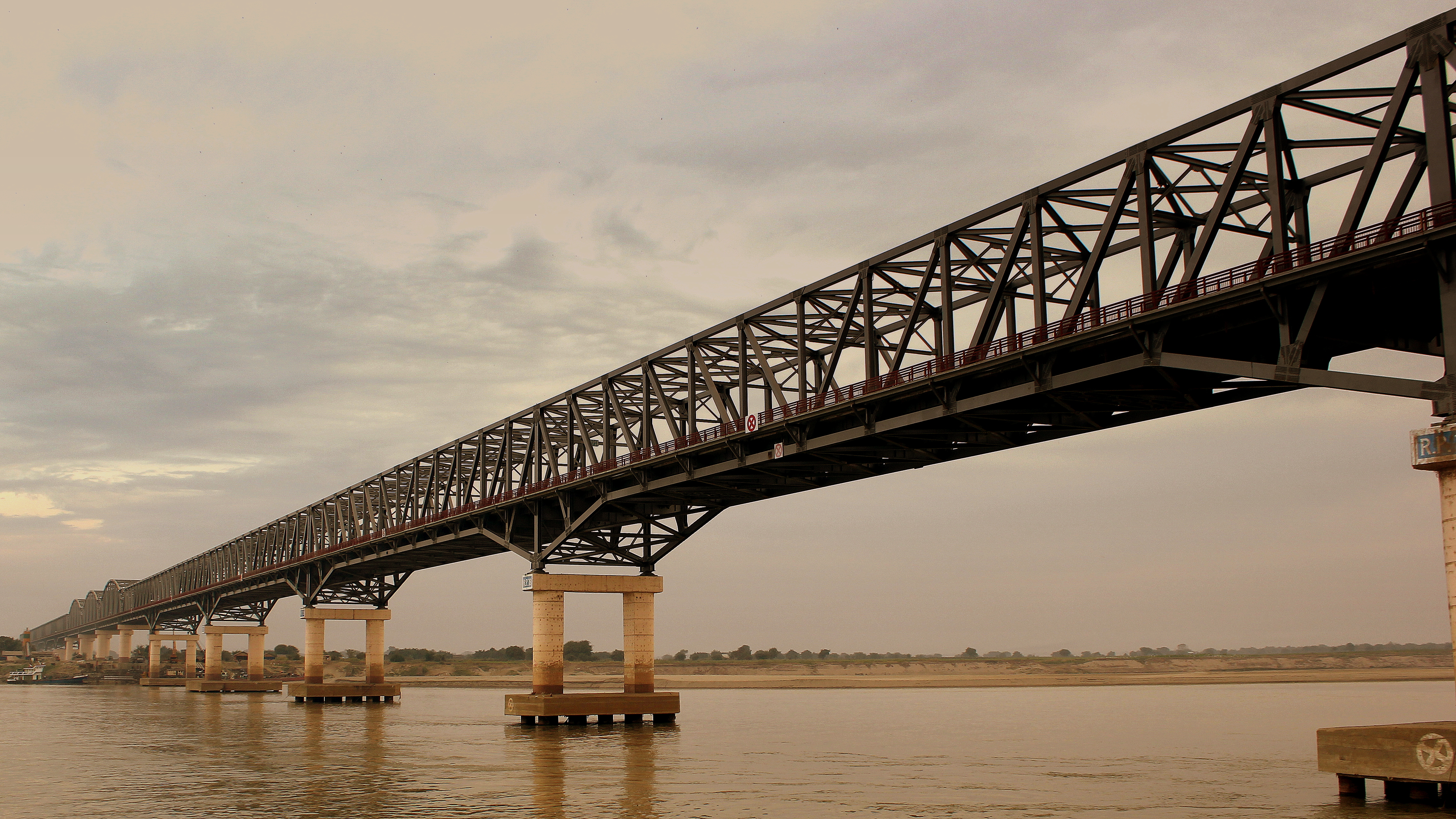
The bridge as the ferry passes below it

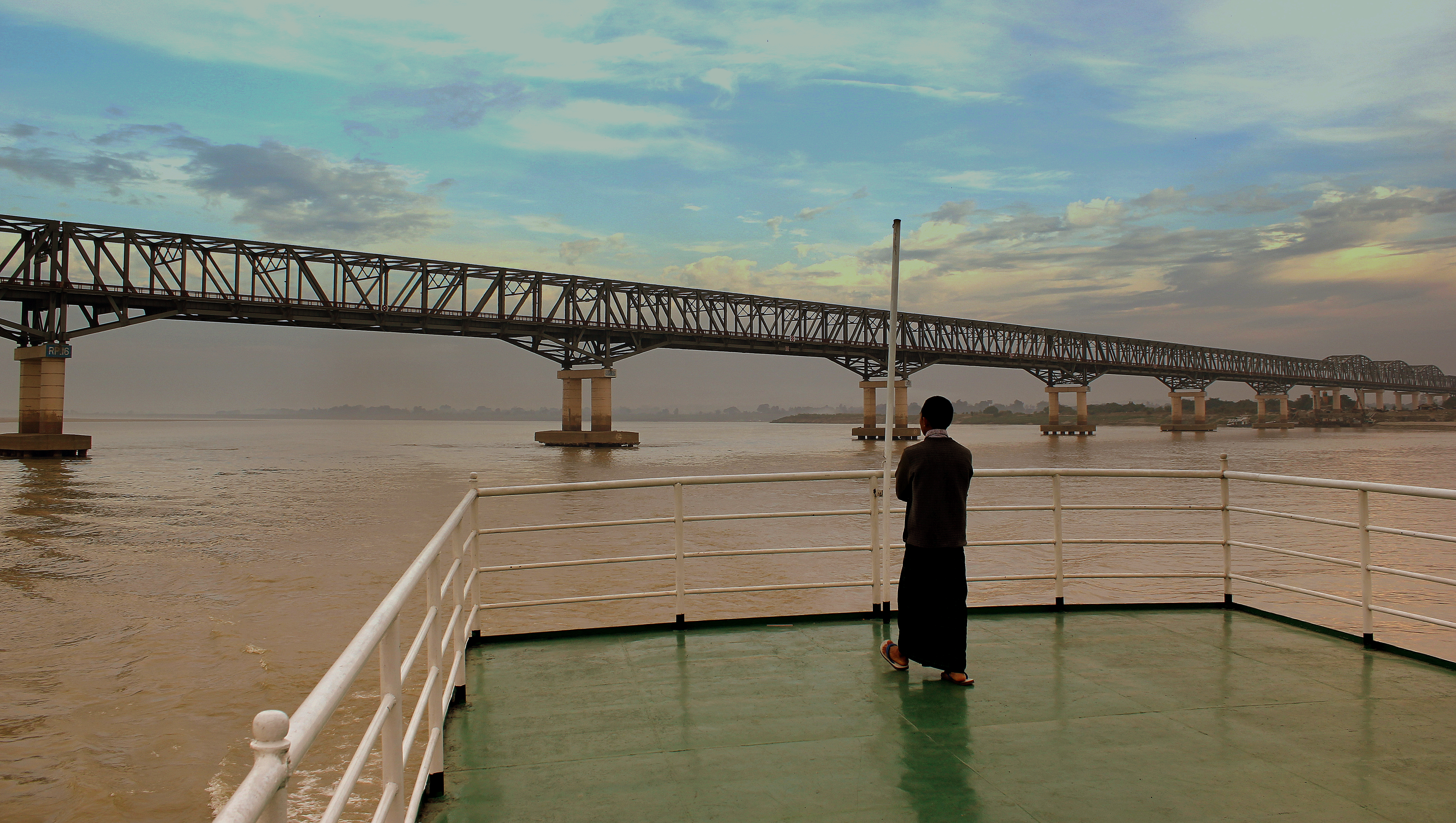
View of the bridge from the ferry

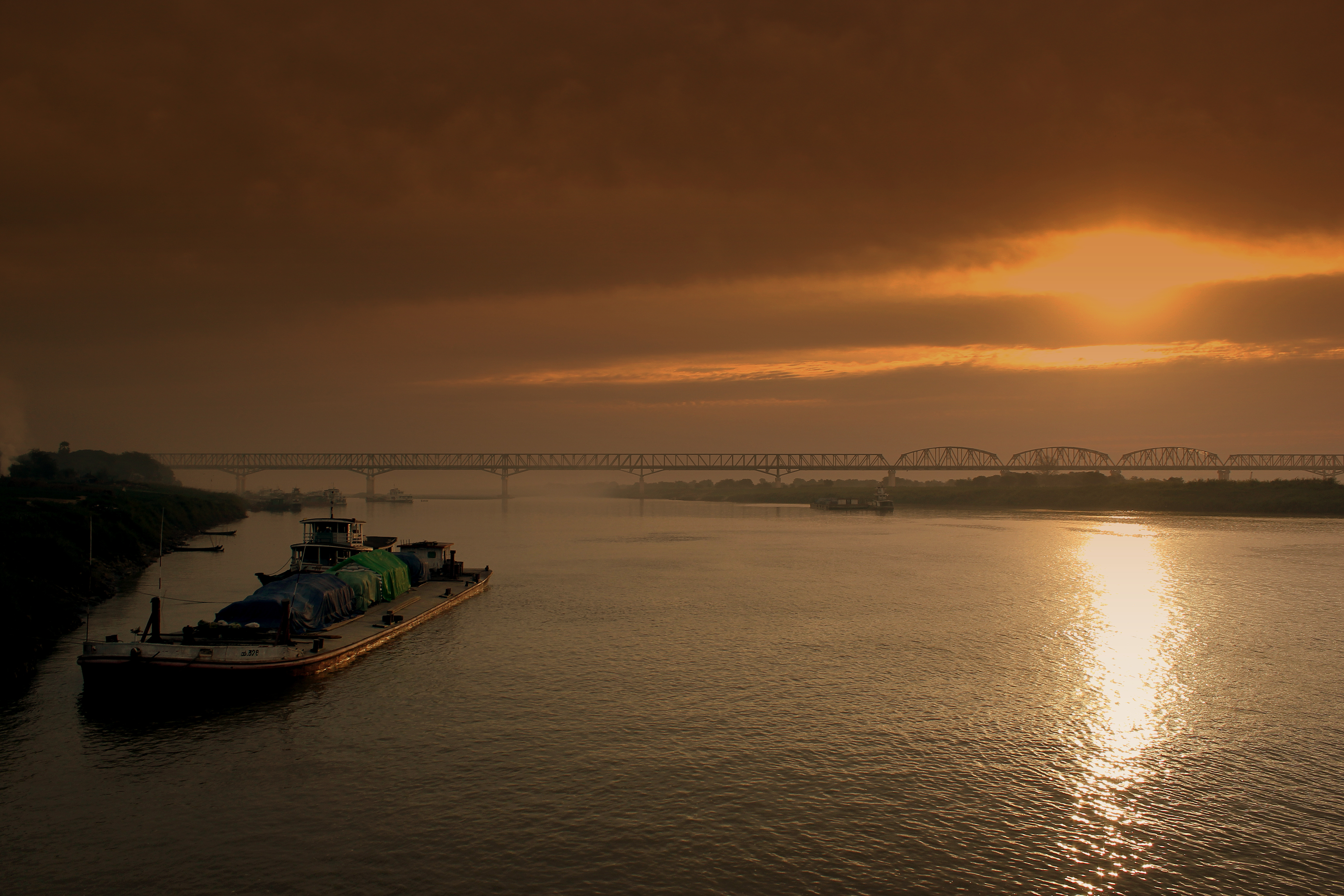
Sunset at the bridge.

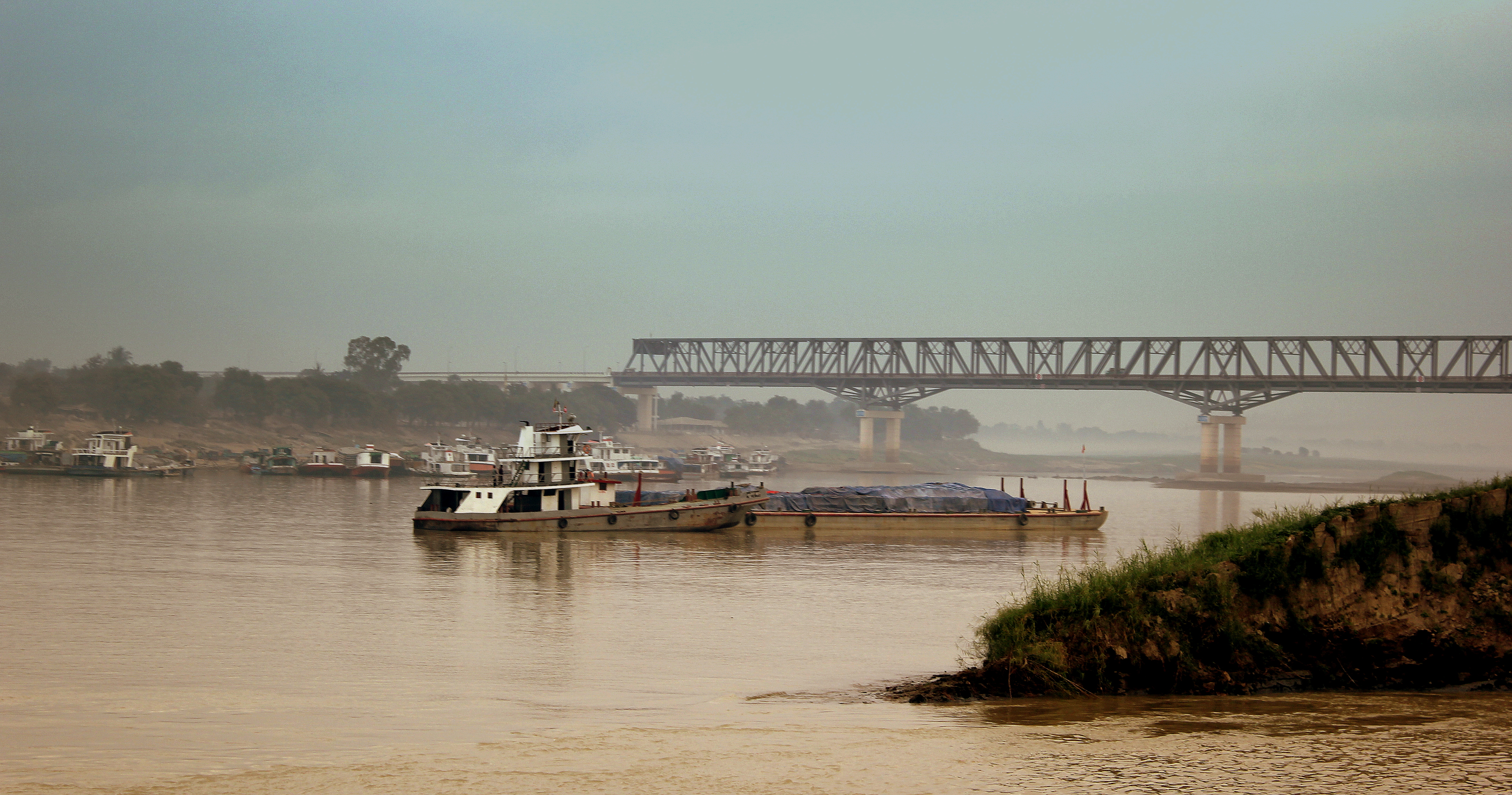
Ferries plying on the river with the bridge in the backdrop

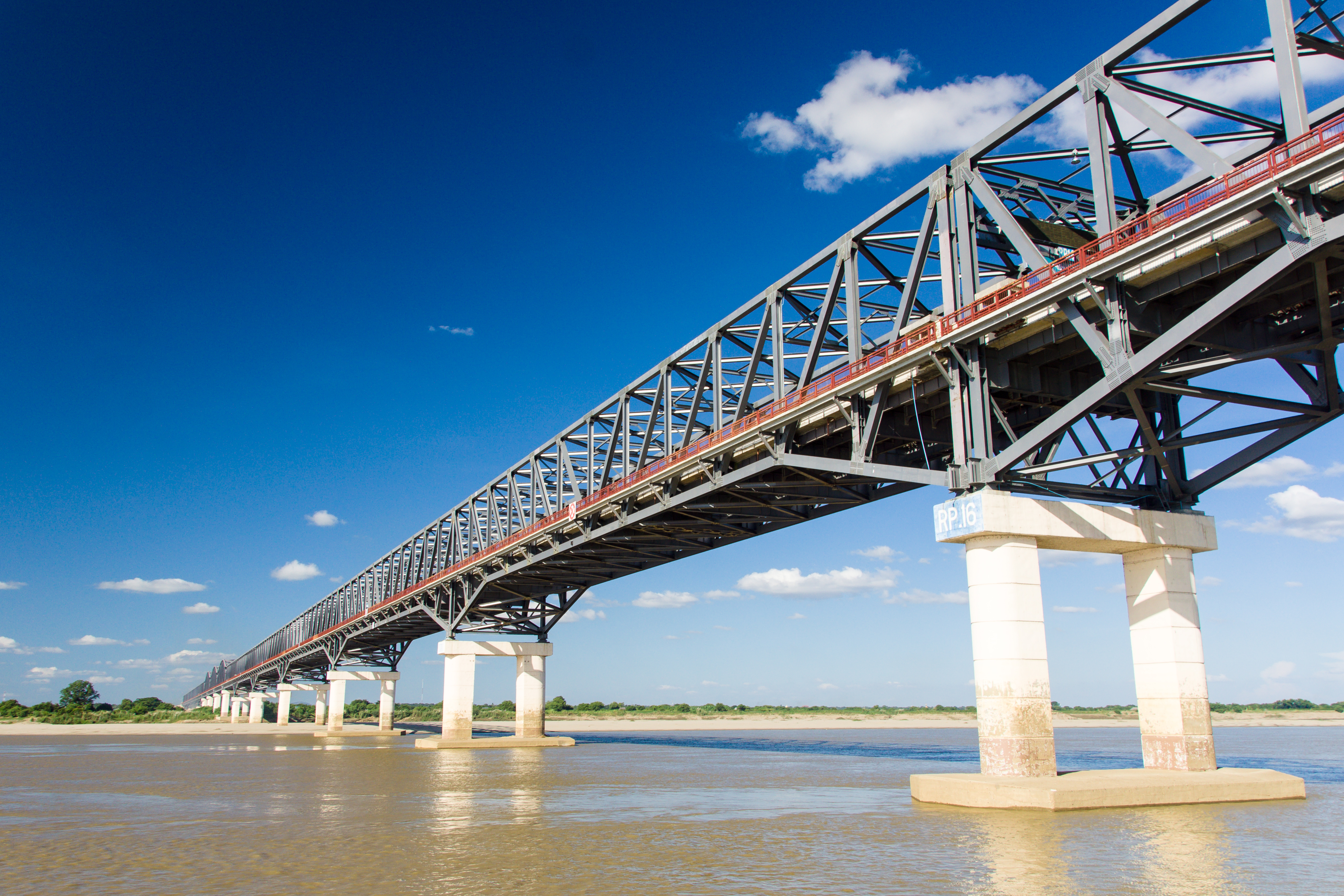
The bridge on a clear day

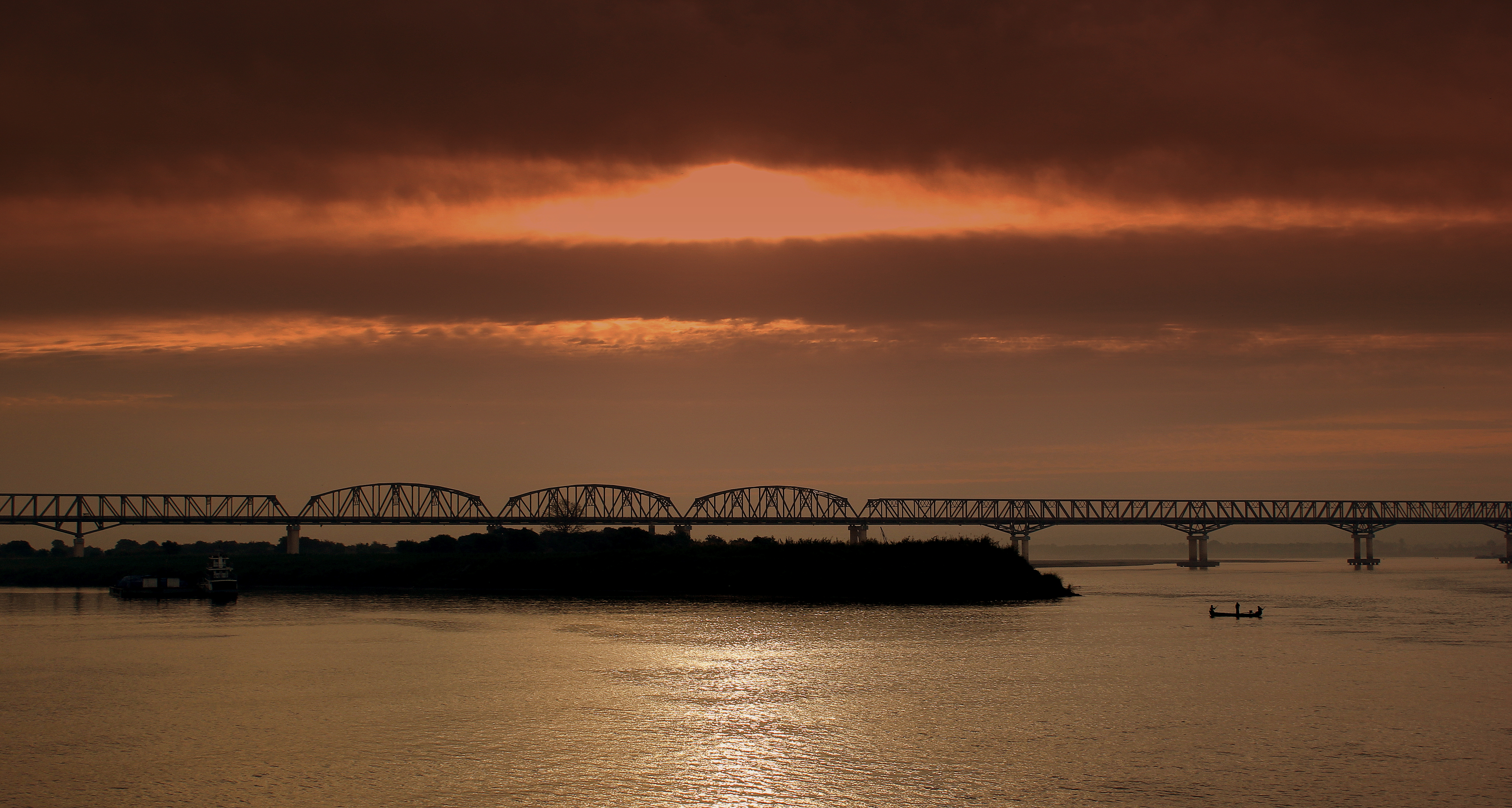
The bridge as night falls

== See also ==
- List of bridges in Myanmar
