= Thandiwe =

Thandiwe is a given name of Nguni origin which means "beloved". Notable people with the name include:

- Thandiwe Abdullah, American civic activist
- Thandiwe Banda (born 1971/1972), Zambian political science teacher; First Lady of Zambia
- Thandiwe Mweetwa (born 1988), Zambian wildlife biologist and educator
- Thandiwe Newton (born 1972), English actress
- Thandiwe Zungu (born 1960), South African politician

== See also ==
- Thandie, a given name
- Thandi (name), a given name
