= Zami River =

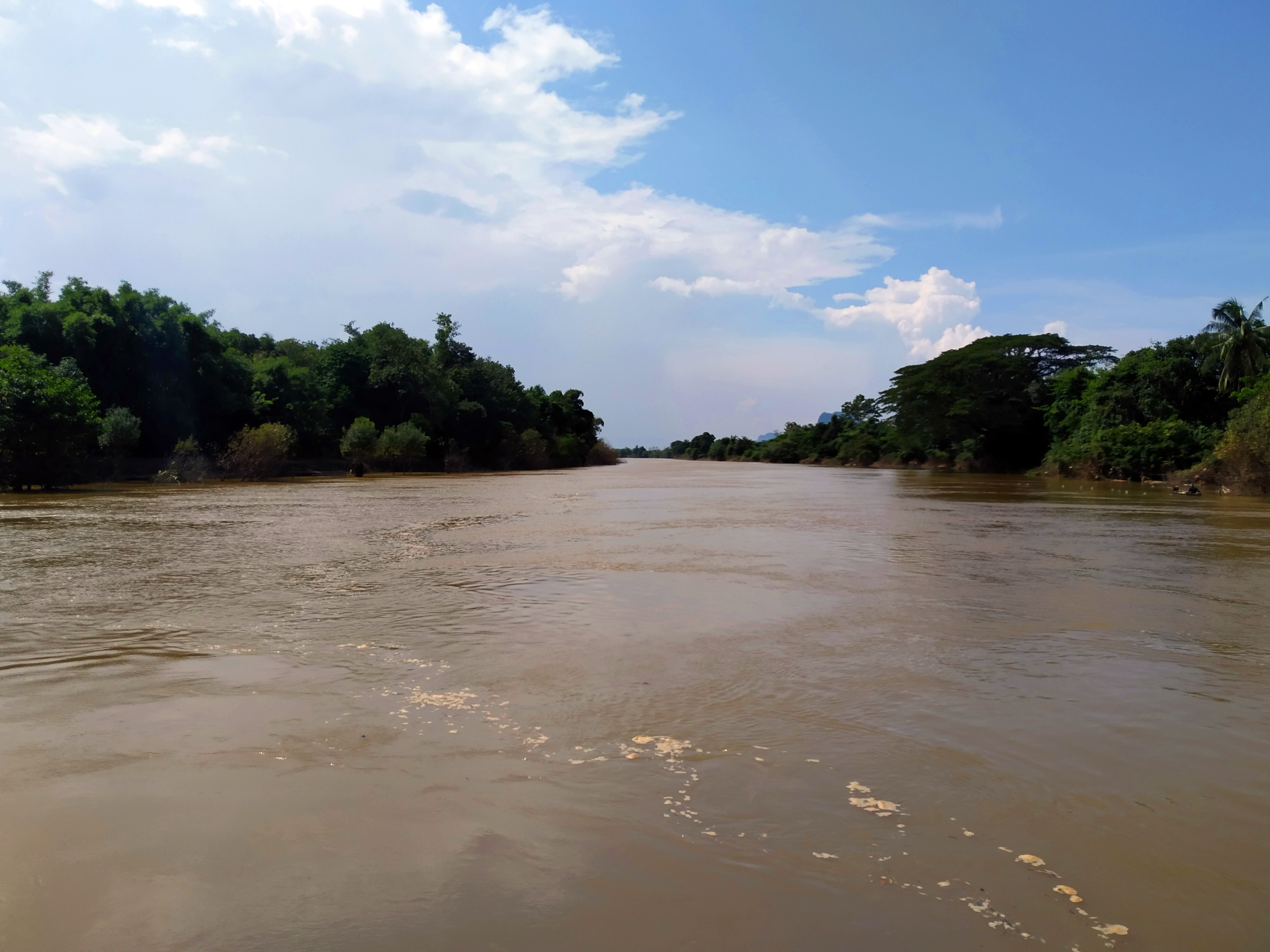
- Zami River at Kyainseikgyi Township
- Native name: ဇမိမြစ် (Burmese)

Location
- Country: Myanmar
- District: Kawkareik District
- City: Kyainseikgyi

Physical characteristics
- Source
  - location: Karen State, Myanmar
  - coordinates: 16°09′N 97°58′E
- Mouth: Ataran River
  - location: Chaunghanakwa, Myanmar
  - elevation: 7 m (23 ft)
- Length: 300 km (190 mi)

Zami River (Burmese: ဇမိမြစ်) is a river of Myanmar, arising at 15°17′16″N 98°15′37″E in southern Kayin State. It flows north past Kyondaw, Phadaw, Apalon, Kanni, Kyungyaung, Danon, Kyain Seikgyi, and Chaunghanakwa, where it flows into Mon State. The Zami River is a tributary of the Ataran River, which, on a grander scale, and is part of the Salween River Basin.

== See also ==
- List of rivers of Burma
