= A-thút =

A-thút A-thoot
- Location of mouth

Location
- Country: Myanmar
- District: Pathein District

Physical characteristics
- Mouth
  - coordinates: 16.750173643241638°N 94.50141591069786°E

A-thút or A-thoot is a river in Myanmar, in the Pathein District. It is born on Kyunlaha Lake and runs southwest on flat lands until it empties into the river Kyun-kabo not far from Paya-thun-zu. It is navigable about 25 km in rainy season.

== See also ==
- List of rivers of Myanmar
- Geography of Myanmar
