= Bogyoke Aung San bridge =

Bridge in Mon State, Myanmar

Bogyoke Aung San Bridge
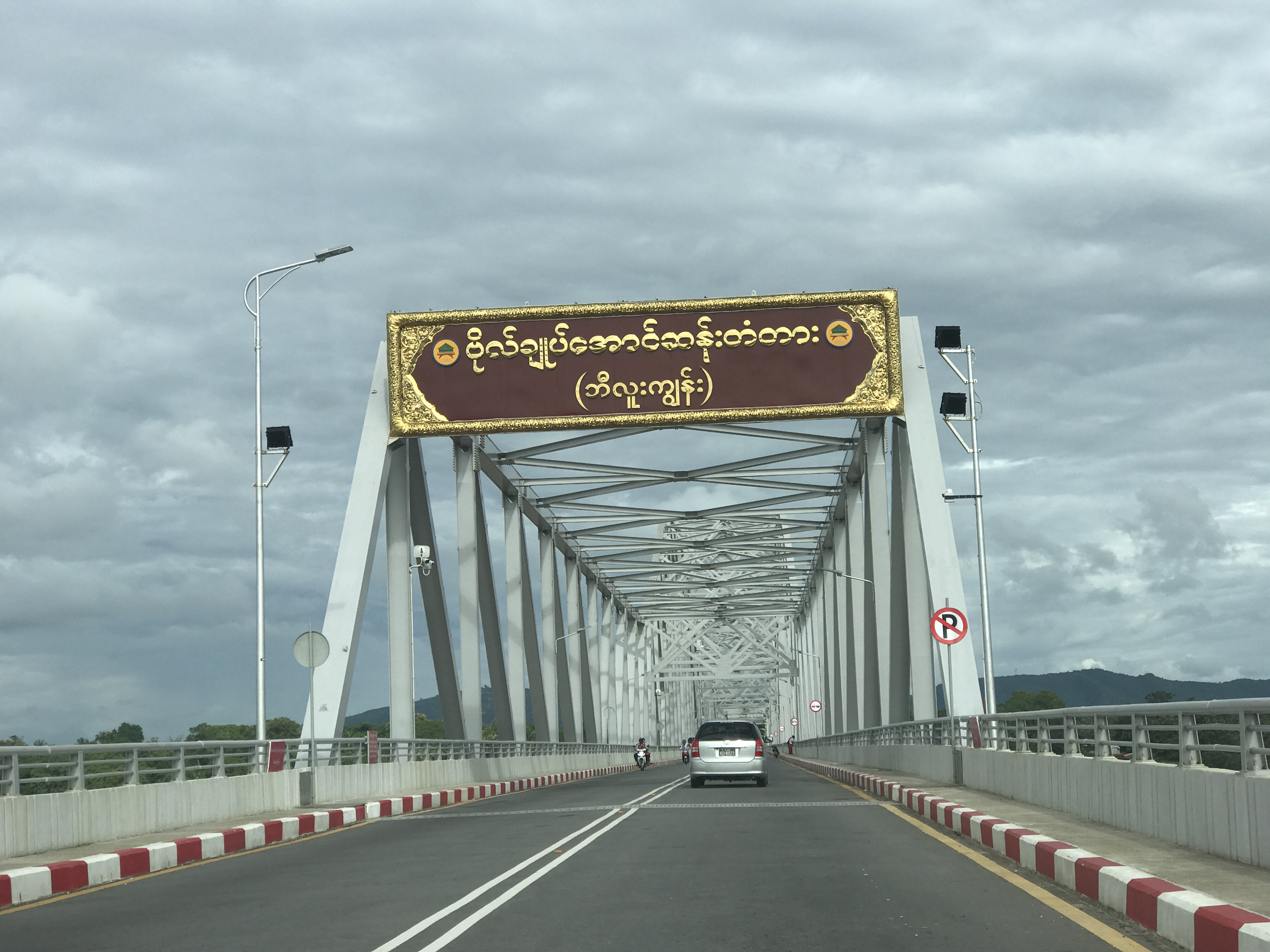
- Coordinates: 16°26′26.9″N 97°36′33.8″E
- Crosses: Thanlwin River
- Locale: Mon State
- Official name: ဗိုလ်ချုပ်အောင်ဆန်း တံတား
- Other name(s): Thanlwin Bridge (Chaungzon Township)
- Named for: General Aung San

Characteristics
- Design: Two-way steel arch arch bridge
- Total length: 5,230 feet (1,590 m)
- Width: 28 feet (8.5 m)

History
- Construction start: February 8, 2015
- Construction end: April 2017
- Construction cost: About 59,800 million kyats
- Opened: April 27, 2017
- Inaugurated: May 9, 2017

The Bogyoke Aung San bridge (Burmese: ဗိုလ်ချုပ်အောင်ဆန်း တံတား) is a bridge crossing over the Thanlwin River in Mawlamyine, Myanmar and connects Mawlamyine to Chaungzon. The bridge is also known as the Bilu Kyun Bridge. It was officially opened to the public on May 9, 2017.

== Information ==
The bridge is estimated to have cost 59,800 million kyats ($46,046,000 US Dollars) and is 5,203 feet (1,586 m) long. It is 28 feet wide and has a two-way steel arch bridge. The Mupon approach road on the Moulmein side is the shorter of the roads at around 757 feet long. The Bilu Island Ka Kyaw approach road is 16,980 feet long. On April 26, 2017, at 9 PM, a sign was erected under the name Bogyoke Aung San Bridge (Bilu Island) and on April 27, at approximately 9:45 AM, motorcycles and cars were allowed to pass the bridge free of charge.

== Controversy ==
The actual construction began under the name Thanlwin Bridge (Chaungzon), but at the end of the construction, the Pyithu Hluttaw had approved the name Bogyoke Aung San Bridge. Some local Mon ethnic groups staged multiple protests in March 2017 to rename it as the Thanlwin Bridge (Chaungzon). As of April 26, 2017, the petition has received about 150,000 signatures.

On April 5, 2017, fourteen political parties issued a statement that "The government should seriously reconsider naming the Bogyoke Aung San Bridge as it will not contribute to the national reconciliation and it will not undermine the national unity."

MP from Paung Township Mi Kun Chan's proposal to name Bogyoke Aung San Bridge was approved by a split vote in the Pyithu Hluttaw on 14 January 2017 with a total of 217 votes in favor and 2 abstentions. There were 43 votes against. The nomination was won due to 116 neutral votes.

ဗိုလ်ချုပ်အောက်ဆန်း names
