= Kataik Dam =

Dam in Mon State, Myanmar

Coordinates: 16°44′17.3″N 97°27′40.1″E

Kataik Dam is a dam in Paung Township, Thaton District, Mon State, Burma. It was completed in 2007 and became the 198th dam in Burma and the 10th in Mon State, opening on May 1. It is operated by the Irrigation Department of the Burmese Ministry of Agriculture and Irrigation and is intended to benefit 10,000 acres (40 km^{2}) of farmlands and facilitate regional socio-economic development as part of an overall coordinated state development in Mon State. Agricultural productivity is important to the economy of the region, not only for trade but for ensuring an adequate food supply.
