= Kattel Bridge =

Bridge Chin State, Myanmar

Kapteel Bridge
- Coordinates: 23°18′41″N 93°37′02″E
- Crosses: Manipur River
- Locale: Tedim Township, Chin State
- Official name: Kapteel Bridge
- Maintained by: Ministry of Construction, Union of Myanmar's Government

Characteristics
- Design: Suspension bridge
- Total length: 480-foot (150 m) long
- Width: 10-foot-9-inch (3.28 m) wide
- Load limit: 3 tons

History
- Construction end: April 25, 2002
- Opened: April 25, 2002

Kapteel Bridge (Zomi: Kapteel Guun Lei) is a bridge in Tedim Township, Chin State, Myanmar and opened on April 25, 2002. Kapteel Bridge is a suspension bridge across Manipur River in Chin State (Zogam).

The bridge is 480 feet (150 m) long and 10 feet 9 inches (3.28 m) wide. The bridge is on Tedim - Kapteel - Rih Lake motor road. Its clearance is 350 feet (110 m) wide and 20 feet (6.1 m) high, and it can bear three tons of load. The bridge was built by Deputy Superintending Engineer U San Win.

== Opening ceremony ==
The bridge opening ceremony was held at the central pandal of the bridge on April 25, 2002. The opening ceremony was attended by Chairman of Sagaing Division Peace and Development Council Commander of North-West Command Brig-Gen Soe Naing, Minister for Construction Maj-Gen Saw Tun, Brig-Gen Khin Maung Aye of Kalay Station, Deputy Minister for Construction Brig-Gen Myint Thein, officials of the ministry, state/district/township level departmental officials, members of the Union Solidarity and Development Association, Maternal and Child Welfare Association, Red Cross Society and Social Organization, and local people, totalling 2,200.
