= Dala Bridge =

Bridge across the Yangon River in Myanmar

The Dala Bridge (Burmese: ဒလတံတား), officially known as the Myanmar–Korea Friendship Bridge (Burmese: မြန်မာ-ကိုရီးယား ချစ်ကြည်ရေးတံတား), is a bridge spanning across the Yangon River in Myanmar. It connects downtown Yangon with Dala Township. It is the country's longest and largest steel cable-stayed bridge.

The project was first proposed in 2012 during a state visit by then President U Thein Sein to South Korea. During the visit, the South Korean government agreed to support the infrastructure project as a gesture of goodwill and to foster bilateral relations with Burma. A Memorandum of Understanding (MoU) was subsequently signed.

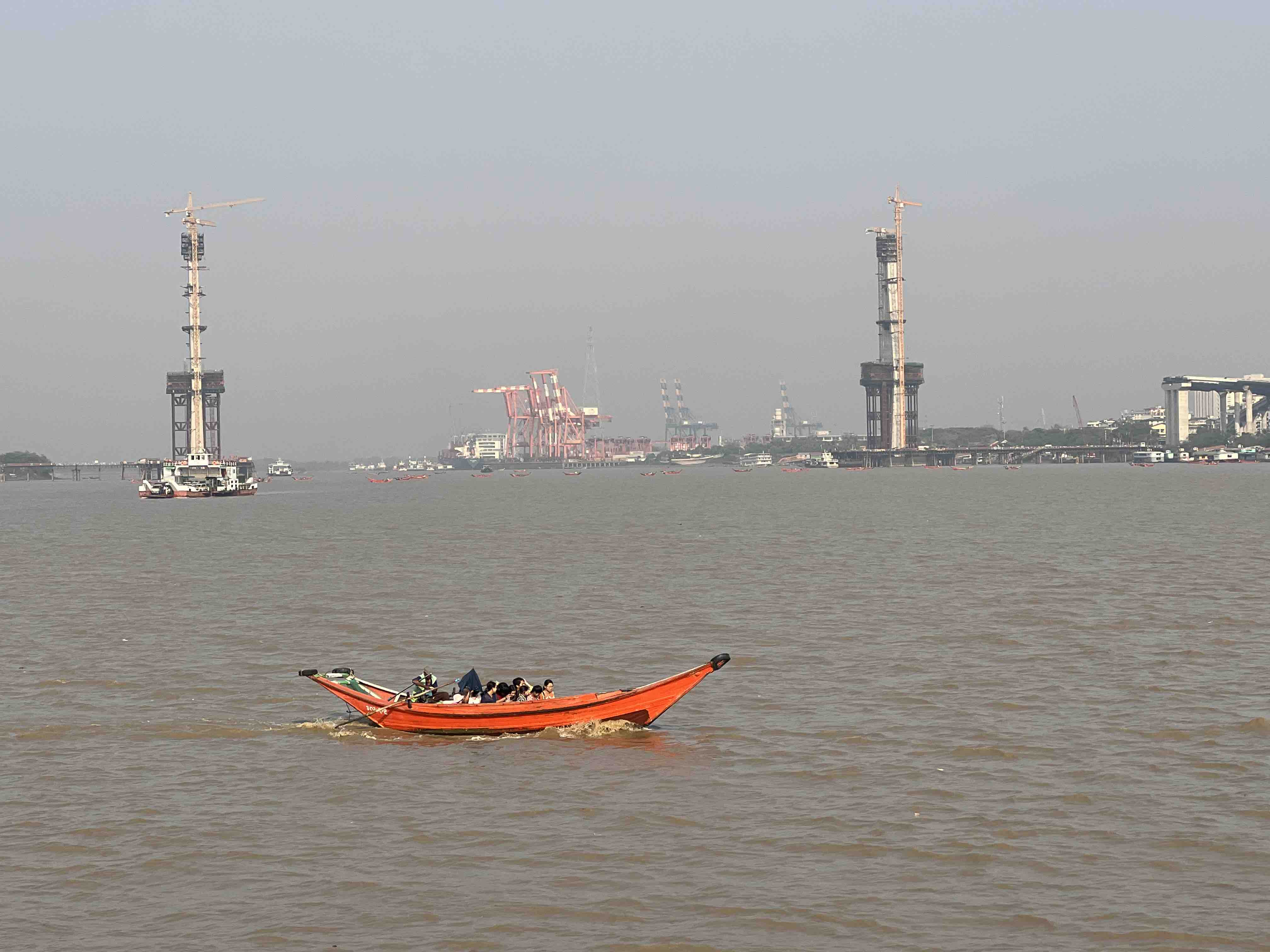
The Dala Bridge construction seen from the Yangon River

Construction first began on 24 December 2018. It was temporarily halted multiple times due to the COVID-19 pandemic and the 2021 military coup.

The bridge was opened successfully on 6 February 2026.
