= Dala Township =

Dala Township ဒလမြို့နယ်
- Township
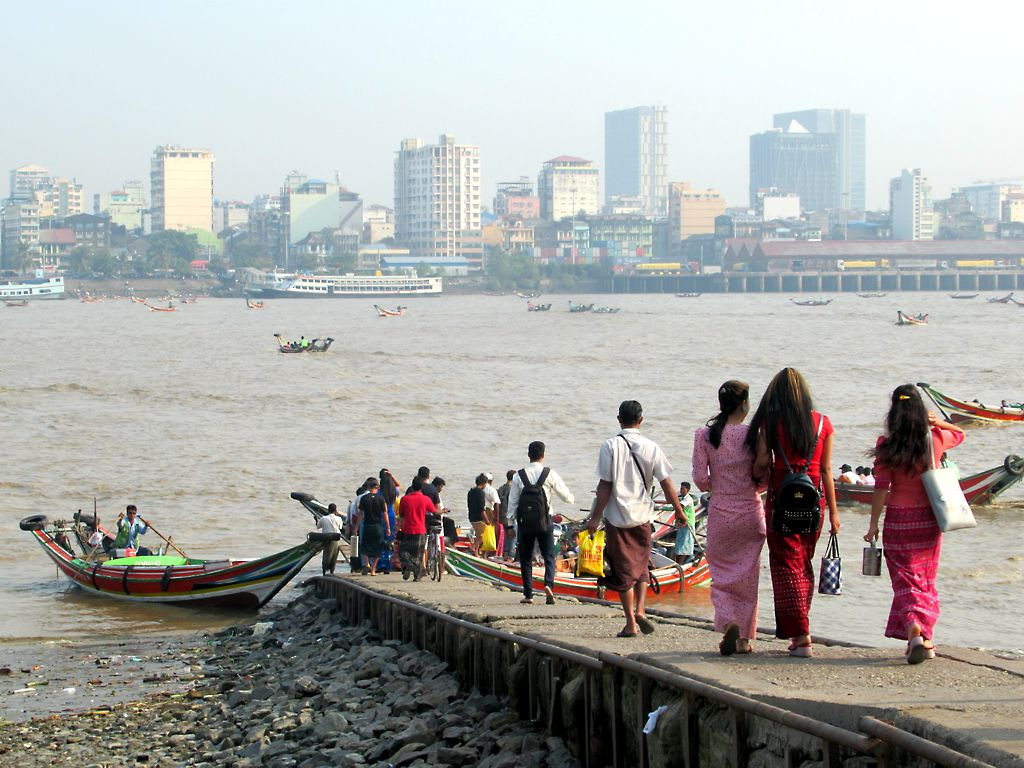
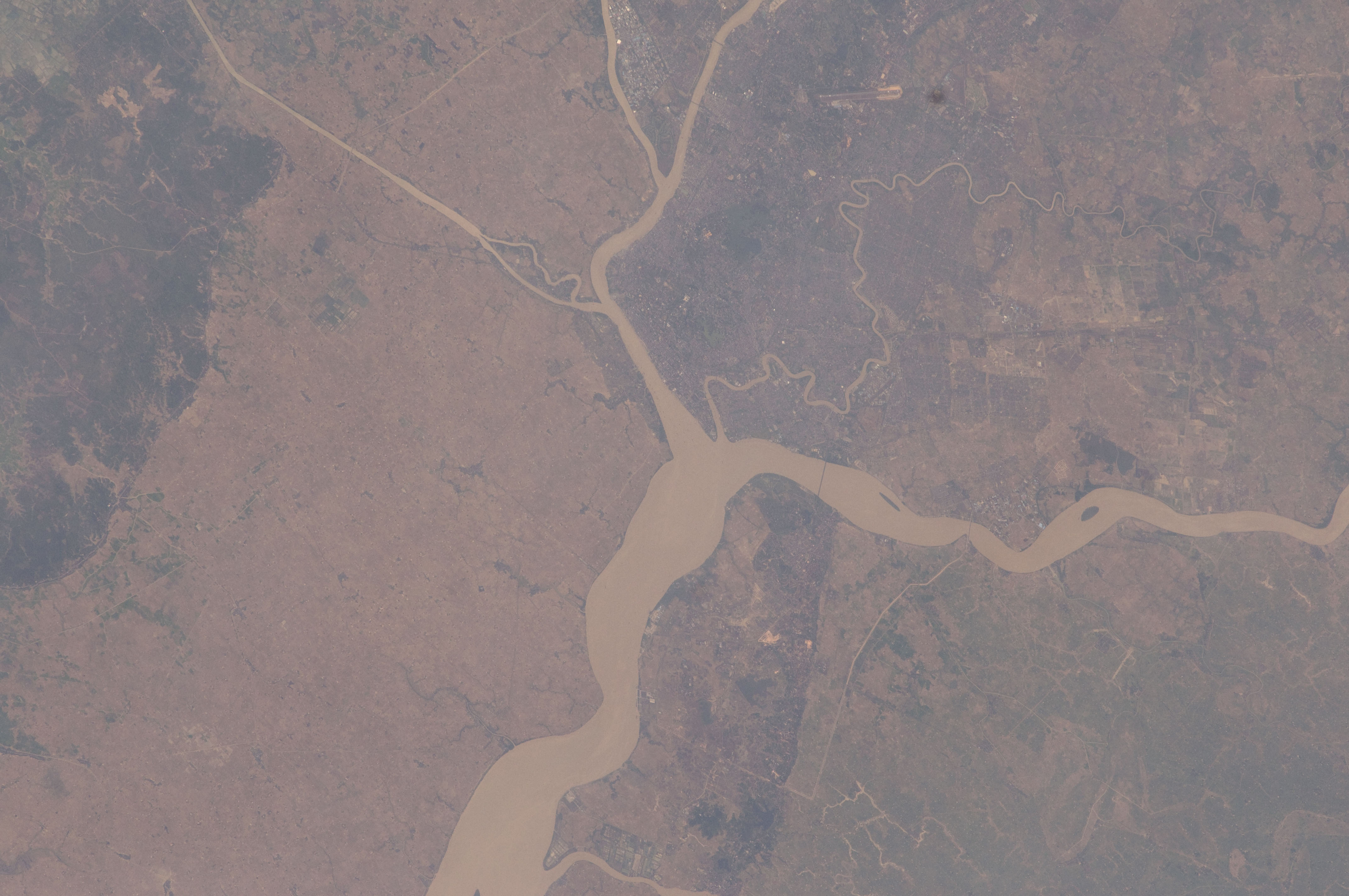
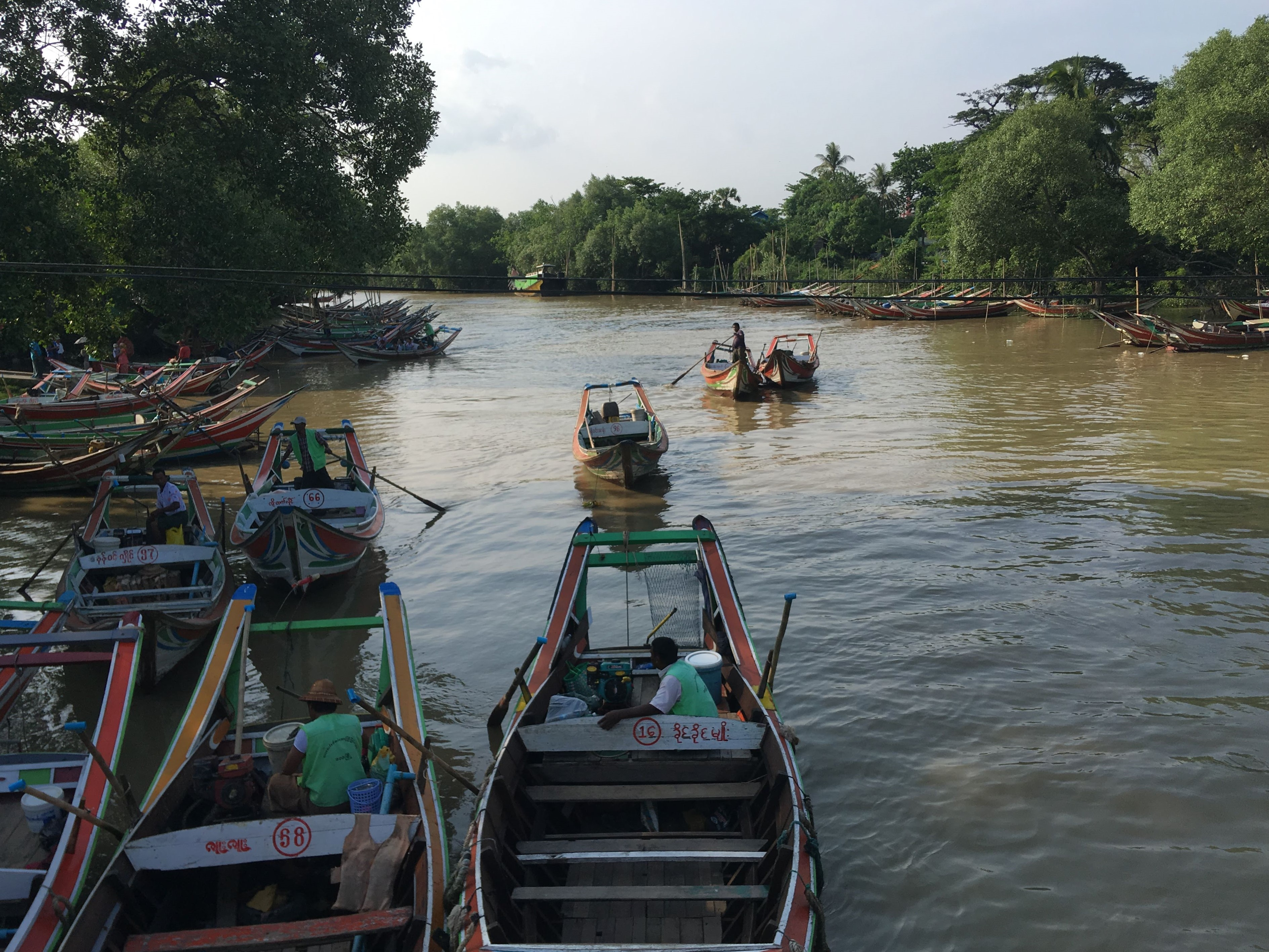
- Commuters in Dala heading downtown View of Yangon from space (at 30⁰ angle east), Dala Township on left side Boats on the Dala River

- Dala Township in Twante District
- Coordinates: 16°45′30″N 96°9′30″E
- Country: Myanmar
- Region: Yangon Region
- City: Yangon
- District: Twante District

Area
  - Total: 86.51 sq mi (224.1 km^{2})

Population (2023)
  - Total: 182,714
  - Density: 2,112/sq mi (815.5/km^{2})
- Time zone: UTC+6:30 (MST)
- Postal codes: 11261
- Area codes: 1 (mobile: 80, 99)

Dala Township (Burmese: ဒလမြို့နယ်, pronounced [dəla̰ mjo̰nɛ̀]) is located on the southern bank of Yangon river across from Downtown Yangon in Myanmar. The township, made up of 23 wards and 23 village tracks (including 50 villages), is bounded by the Yangon River in the north and east, the Twante Canal in the west, and Kawhmu Township in the south. The township's northern portion, the former town of Dala comprising an area of 5.59 square miles (14.5 km^{2}) is within the jurisdiction of Yangon city's government the Yangon City Development Committee (YCDC), though locals consider Dala a separate urban area. Dala has many differences from Yangon, ones being prices and architecture.

== History ==
In 1805, Alaungpaya's fourth son King Bodawpaya appointed Htaw Lay as the governor (myoza) of Dala (modern-day Dala and Twante).

During the colonial era, Dala was the site of the major shipyard of the Irrawaddy Flotilla Company.

== Transportation ==
Despite its strategic location near Yangon, the township is still largely rural and undeveloped. Back then, the only efficient way to commute to the largest settlement in the township, Dala, was by ferry or small boats called "Thamban". Another way of going to the township or town itself is going to Insein or Mayangon Township, crossing the bridge, turning left at the park by the intersection (south), going straight down, paying the toll to go on the Twantay Bridge, turning left at the intersection with the gas station (east), and going straight to Dala, but it takes almost 2 hours from Downtown. But in 2017, a bridge project was announced with an MOU signed with a Korean company. After almost 7 years, the bridge, the Myanmar-Korea Friendship Bridge (called the "Dala Bridge" by Yangonian locals), was finished on 6 February 2026 and is now open to commuters. The bridge collects tolls based on vehicle types and used to be open to pedestrians, though access to pedestrians has now been closed. You can also go to Dala by bus (the YBS buses) via the bridge.

== Education ==
Dala Township has all types of Basic Education Schools (B.E.P.S., B.E.M.S., and B.E.H.S.) yet they don't have a university. If students wanted to pursue tertiary education, most would go to Yangon and go to either Yangon University or Dagon University.

== Demographics ==
Due to its unique geography and relative location with Yangon, Dala is one of the few townships in the country who has a higher urban population than a rural population without being fully part of a city. In 2023, Dala Township as a whole had 182,713 people in the township. The northern portion, which is included in Yangon city, has 70.0% of the population with 127,918 people in 2023.

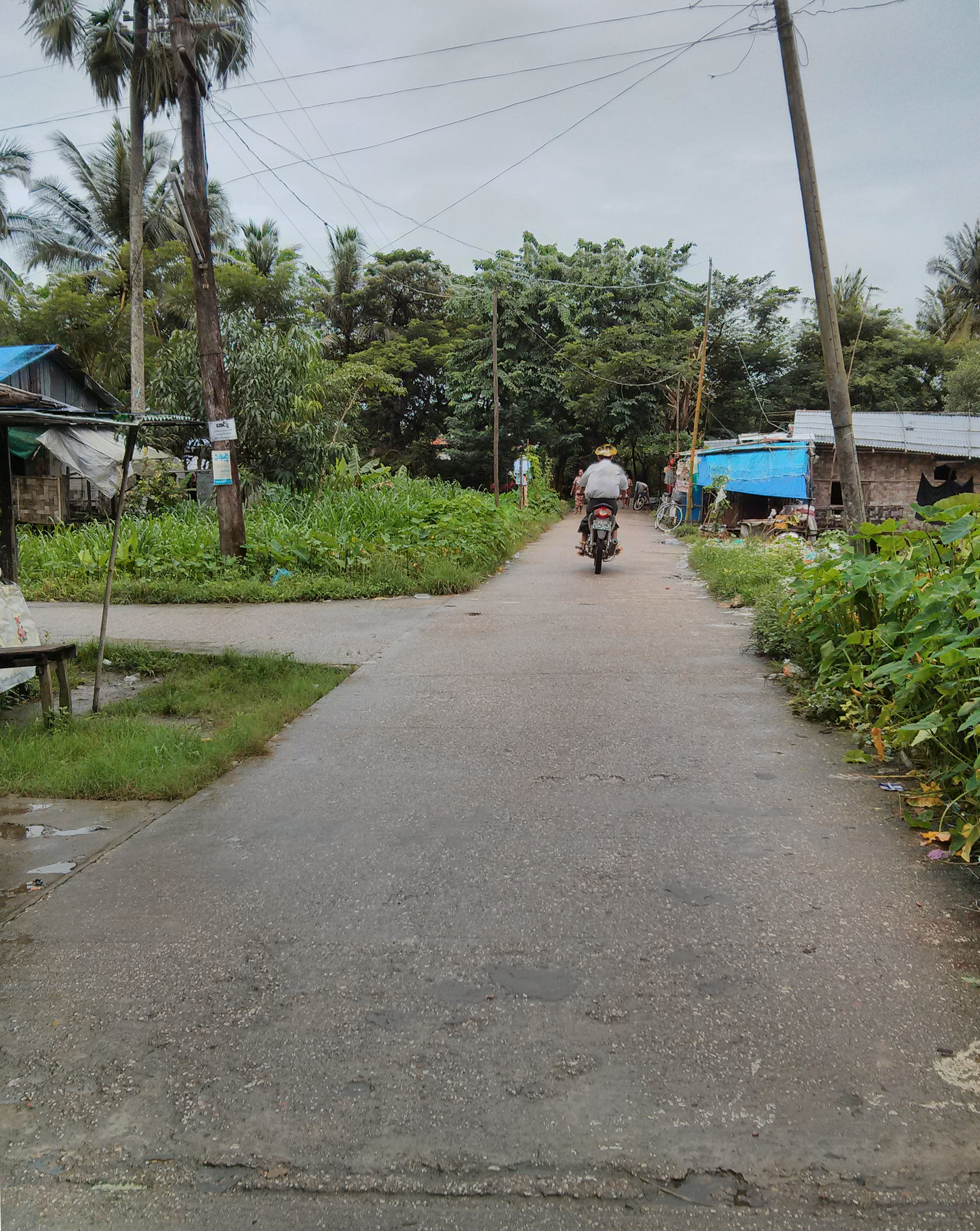
A street in Dala
