= Thandi Sibisi =

South African art gallery owner (born 1986)

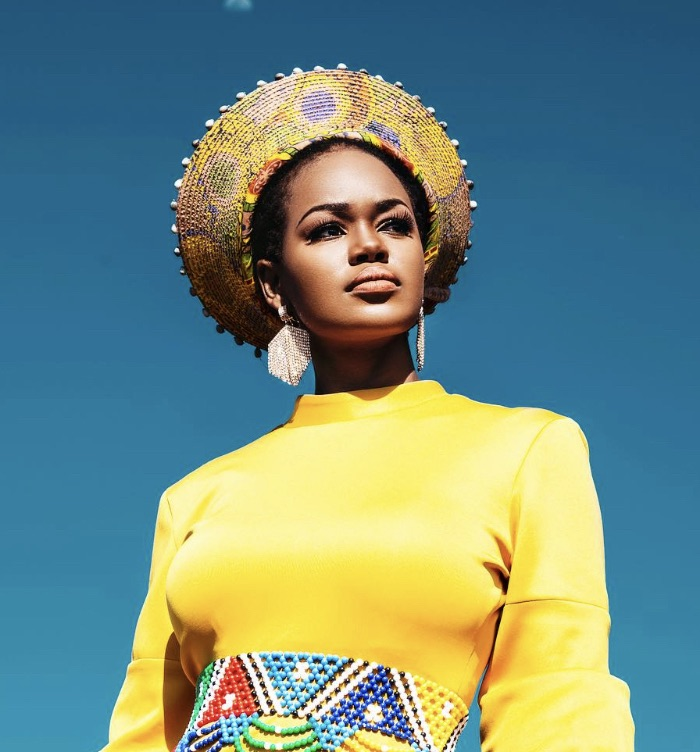
- Born: Ithandile Sibisi; 4 November 1986 (age 40); Estcourt, KwaZulu Natal, South Africa
- Education: University of Johannesburg, University of South Africa
- Occupations: Art dealer, Gallery owner
- Years active: 2005–present

Ithandile "Thandi" Sibisi (born 4 November 1986) is a South African art dealer and gallerist whose career has been central to the expansion of contemporary African art markets on the continent. In 2012, at the age of 25 she established Sibisi Gallery in the Melrose Arch precinct of Johannesburg, becoming the first Black woman to own and operate an art gallery in South Africa. Sibisi Gallery, also one of the first black female owned galleries in the world became part of the establishment in the contemporary African art space showcasing artists from across the continent.

== Early life and education ==
Sibisi was born on 4 November 1986 in Estcourt, South Africa to Siphiwo Sibisi and Sizeni MaMncube Sibisi. She is the last born of 9 children. Sibisi grew up in Weenen, a small town well known for its political and tribal conflicts. Sibisi and her family lived in a village named KwaMtebhelu, surrounded by faction fighting. Sibisi and her family moved to Ladysmith when she was 7-years-old to escape the conflict in Weenen.

Sibisi's parents were subsistence farmers of corn and cattle. Sibisi grew up herding cows and tending to the corn fields with her mother, father and siblings. Sibisi credits this time as her best years, and her mother, her best teacher, "she instilled in me a deep profound love for Africa. She told me stories about the history of a glorious continent and taught me to love it and serve it always".

Sibisi studied Business Management at the University of Johannesburg and dropped out after one year to start her own business in marketing. Sibisi inspired by her rural South African roots started Invogue Concepts at the age of 18, with the aim to propagate African arts and culture. Her aim was to shine a spotlight on African arts and culture, remind Africans of their intrinsic identity by showcasing it to the world.

== Career ==
Sibisi founded her first business, a media house, at the age of 18. Early in her career Sibisi battled to get her media house to take off. She describes this time as a blessing in disguise, "it was character building. I learned to rely on myself, as I was always alone persuing [sic] the impossible. I am grateful for this time because it taught me humility." At age 22, Sibisi's career began to take off, when she moved to Mahikeng, to consult with various government departments.

While working with the Department of Arts and Culture (South Africa), Sibisi re-discovered her love for contemporary African art. During a 6-month summit in Paris, France, Sibisi made a resolution to open Sibisi Gallery, a contemporary art gallery focused in contemporary African art.

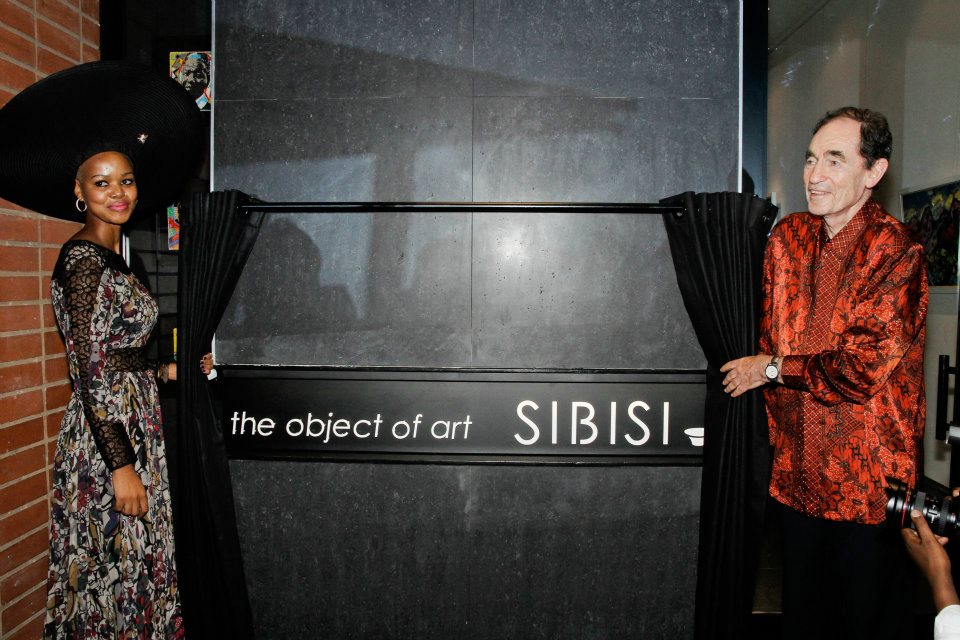
Thandi Sibisi with Justice Albie Sachs unveiling Sibisi Gallery. 2012

At 25, Sibisi became the first black woman to own an art gallery in South Africa, when she opened Sibisi Gallery at the Melrose Arch in Johannesburg.

In 2015, the company reincorporated into the equity holding company, Sibisi Holdings, an investment art group that garnered her invaluable founder and investor experience. Sibisi is passionate about local economic development. Sibisi Holdings' main focus is the promotion and accessibility of African arts and culture.

== Philanthropy and causes ==
Beyond her gallery work, Sibisi is the founder and director of the Sibisi Foundation, a philanthropic organisation focused on the welfare of rural women and girls in South Africa.

The Injusuthi Project is a Sibisi Foundation initiative which documents the stories of Ukuthwala, the act of forcing young women to enter into wedlock as young as 12-years-old. Ukuthwala is a cultural practice prevalent in South Africa, especially in KwaZulu Natal and Eastern Cape. Being born around this practice, Sibisi saw how this practice devastated families and young victims and has since sought to create awareness around it.

Although the practice has been integrated into the Traffic of Persons Act in South Africa, it is still rife in rural communities. As a result of this practice, young women lose the opportunity to get an education, they often find themselves having to grow up living with HIV and AIDS, and become victims of gender-based violence. Sibisi Foundation believes that this practice should not exist in a free and fair South Africa.

As an art practitioner Sibisi works closely with artists and craftspeople whom are at the beginner level phase, assisting in the development of their skills and creating an art market for the commercialization of their works of art. A big part of that involves sustainable development for female artists and crafters from previously disadvantaged backgrounds.

== Personal life ==
Sibisi identifies as a traditionalist and attributes her beliefs to African spirituality and traditional African religions, which she has spoken publicly in support of.
