= Bilu Island =

Bilu Island (Burmese: ဘီလူးကျွန်း; Mon: တေကာ့ခမိုင်း; Bilu Kyun, lit. "ogre island") is a Deltaic island of the Salween (Thanlwin) River in Chaungzon Township, Mon State, located west of Mawlamyine. The island is roughly the size of Singapore, and inhabited by 200,000 people.

On 8 February 2015, the Mon State government began a construction project to build a 1,586-metre (5,203 ft) bridge, the Bogyoke Aung San bridge, to connect Mawlamyine's Mupun jetty to Bilu Island's Ka-nyaw village, the first to be constructed. The project, which is estimated to cost US$60 million, will be constructed by a Japan-Burma joint venture. The people in this island depend on some interesting home industries such as black boards for schools, rubber bands, cane products, wooden pipes, pencils, pens and tobacco. Bilu island is now connected to the national electrical grid.
