= Thandi River =

River in Myanmar

Coordinates: 16°13′N 95°55′E

The Thandi River (Burmese: သံဒိမြစ်) is a river of Myanmar that lies in Dedaye Township, southeastern Ayeyarwady Region, Myanmar. It is a distributary of the Toe River, which itself is a distributary of Irrawaddy River. The river flows for most part at an elevation of 3 metres (9.8 ft) below sea level. The course of the river starts on the border with Yangon Region near Kyauksarit Island and passes through areas sparsely populated with an average of 266 people inhabiting every square kilometer of land.

The Thandi River is also known as Thandeik River. Towns and settlements near the river include Kyônda (2.9 km (1.8 mi)), Donyan (8.3 km (5.2 mi)), Kyònbaw (8.6 km (5.3 mi)), Begyi (9 km (5.6 mi)), Kyôndat (10.1 km (6.3 mi)), Nyaungleingôn (10.1 km (6.3 mi)) and Thandi (11.4 km (7.1 mi))(29.8 km (18.5 mi). The river ends near the Thandeik village tract where it meets the Gulf of Martaban and the Andaman Sea

== See also ==
- List of rivers of Burma
