= Thandi (rhinoceros) =

Southern white rhinoceros

- Species: Southern white rhinoceros
- Sex: Female
- Born: Kariega Game Reserve
- Known for: First known rhinoceros to survive being poached.

Thandi is a female Southern white rhinoceros living in Kariega Game Reserve in the Eastern Cape, South Africa. She is the first known rhinoceros to have survived being poached.

== Background ==
Thandi grew up in Kariega Game Reserve with several other rhinoceroses. After the poaching incident, she was named Thandi, a isiXhosa word which translates to "courage".

== Poaching incident ==
On 2 March 2012, Thandi and two other rhinoceroses were poached in Kariega Game Reserve. One died overnight, but Thandi and another rhinoceros were found by wildlife conservationists. With the help of the other conservationists, Dr. William Fowlds treated the rhinoceroses for their injuries. The other rhinoceros was named Themba and survived for another month before succumbing to his injuries, but the conservationists managed to save Thandi. It is suspected that the poachers tranquilized the rhinoceroses and used a machete to dehorn them.

== Breeding ==
Nearly three years after being poached, Thandi gave birth to a calf on 13 January 2015.
