= Ataran River =

River in Myanmar and Thailand

Coordinates: 16°31′N 97°39′E

Ataran River (Burmese: အတ္တရံမြစ်) is a river of Burma (most of its course) and Thailand (the uppermost part). In Thailand, it is usually known as the Kasat River. It merges into the larger Gyaing River and Salween River near the city of Mawlamyine. A main tributary of the Ataran River is the Zami River. The Ataran and its tributaries begin near the Thai-Burmese border and flow in a general north-north-west direction.

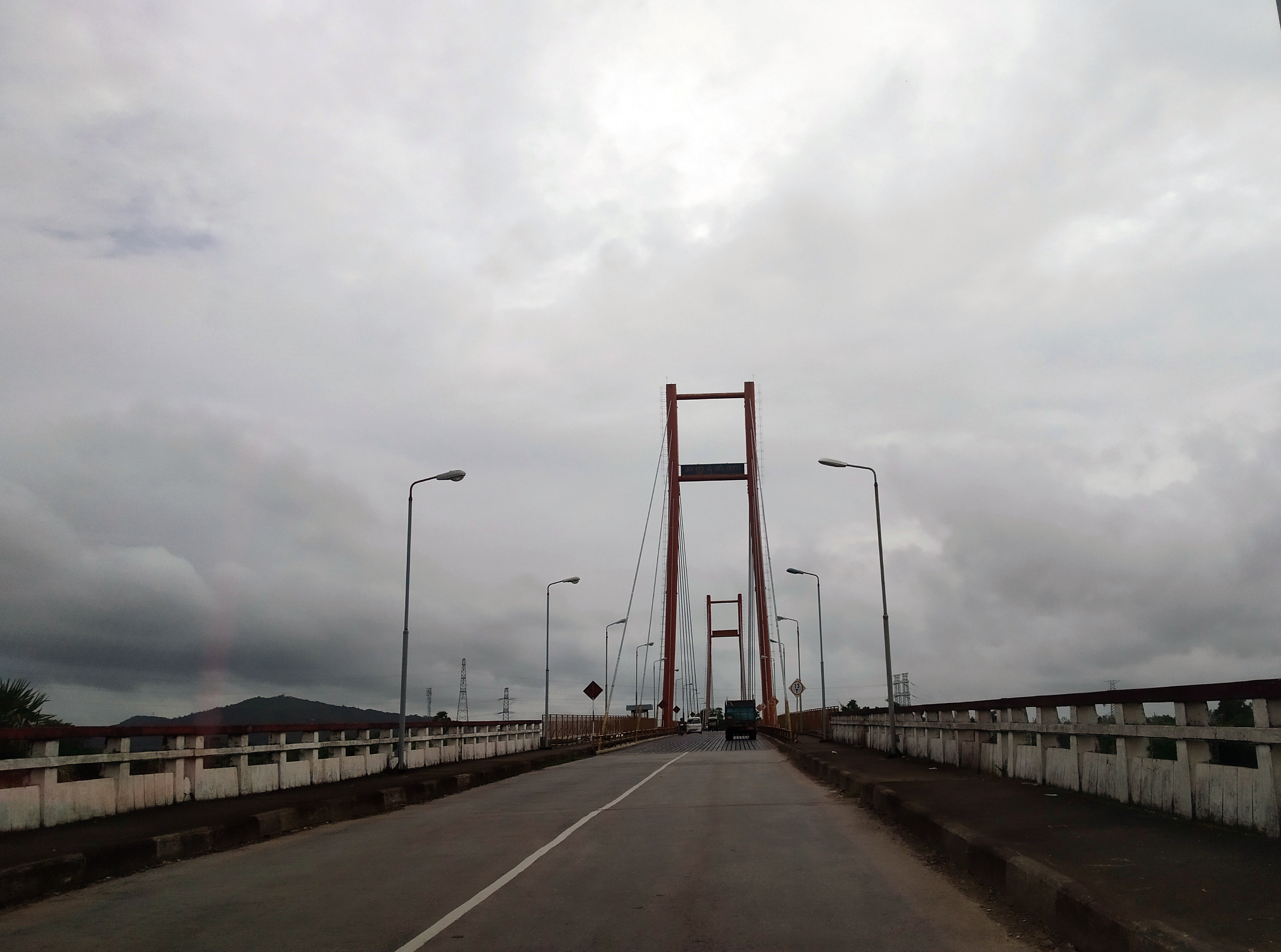
Ataran suspension bridge near Mawlamyine

Several fish species that sometimes are seen in the aquarium trade are native to the Ataran basin, including the Burmese border loach (Botia kubotai), humphead glassfish (Parambassis pulcinella), Microdevario kubotai and Caelatoglanis zonatus etc.

== See also ==
- List of rivers of Burma
