= Waw Township =

Township in Bago Region, Myanmar

Coordinates: 17°28′24″N 96°40′33″E

- Township
- Location in Bago district
- Country: Myanmar
- Region: Bago Region
- District: Bago District
- Capital: Waw

Population (2014)
  - Total: 176,014
- Time zone: UTC+6.30 (MMT)

Waw Township is a township in Bago District in the Bago Region of Myanmar. The principal town is Waw.
