= Sittaung Bridge (Moppalin) =

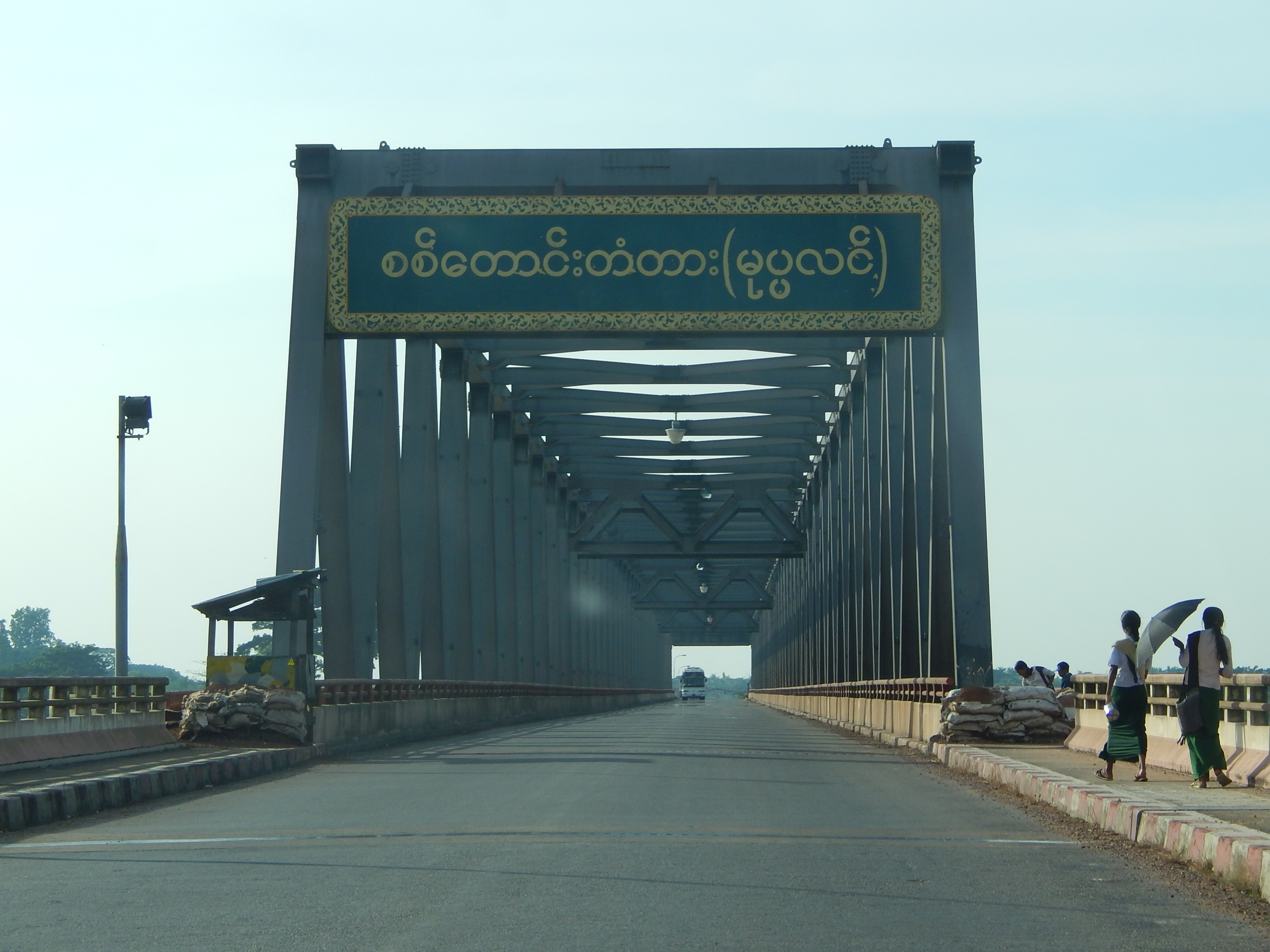
- စစ်တောင်းတံတား (မုပ္ပလင်)
- Coordinates: 17°27′08″N 96°52′34″E
- Crosses: Sittaung River
- Locale: Waw, Bago Region and Moppalin, Mon State
- Official name: Sittaung Bridge at Moppalin
- Maintained by: Ministry of Transportation

Characteristics
- Total length: 729.295 m (2,392.7 ft)
- Width: 12.192 m (40.0 ft)
- Longest span: 416.052 m (1,365.0 ft)
- Clearance above: 6.096 m (20.0 ft)
- Clearance below: 89.916 m (295.0 ft)

History
- Opened: 12 July 2008

Statistics
- Daily traffic: unknown
- Toll: unknown

The Sittaung Bridge at Moppalin (Burmese: စစ်တောင်းတံတား (မုပ္ပလင်)) is a steel bridge spanning the Sittaung river between Waw, Bago Region and Moppalin, Mon State of Myanmar. The bridge is 729.295 metres (2,392.70 ft) long, and has a capacity of 50 tonnes. It is the second bridge across the Sittaung. The older Sittaung Bridge at Theinzayat cannot serve heavier trucks.
