= Gyaing River =

River in Myanmar

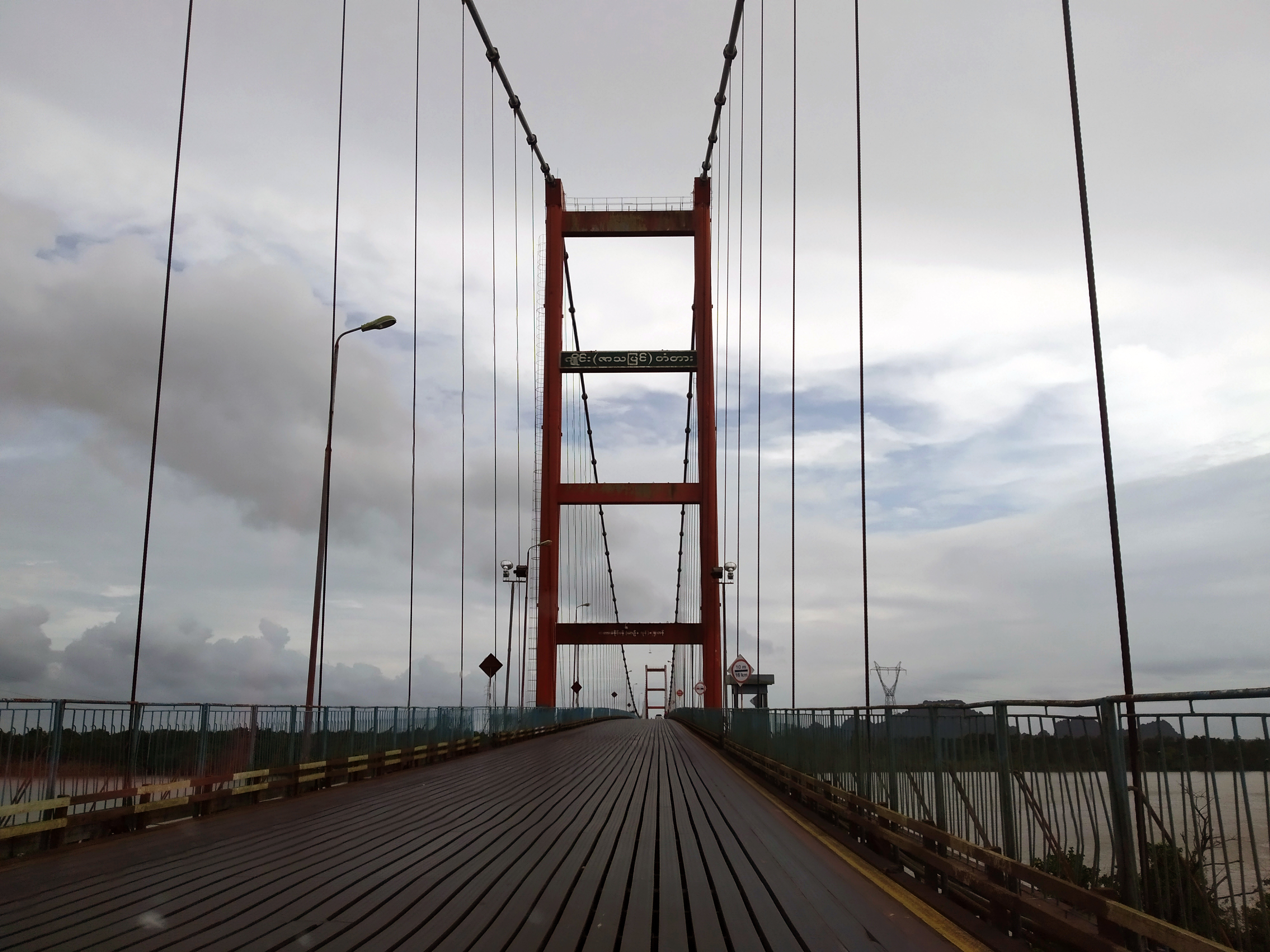
Gyaing suspension bridge between Kayin State and Mon State

Gyaing River (Burmese: ဂျိုင်းမြစ်) is a river of Kayin State and Mon State, in southeastern Burma (Myanmar). Its two major tributaries, the Hlaingbwe River and the Haungtharaw River, flow together to form the Gyaing at 16°36′12″N 98°00′25″E. It is about 45 miles (72 km) long and flows into the Salween River immediately above Moulmein, at 16°30′55″N 97°37′36″E (its mouth).

The Gyaing is a wide river, but quite shallow with numerous sandbars. It is navigable by smaller boats all year long. Important towns and villages along its banks include Gadoe (Kado), Zathabyin (Zathabyeng), Kalagong, Kawbein, Peinnegon, Tarana and Damathat (Dhammatha). The up-stream Gyaing forms part of the border between Hpa-an District and Kawkareik District of Kayin State, and downstream is the border between Kayin State and Mon State.
