= Memorial to the Fallen Heroes (Nay Pyi Taw) =

- သူရဲကောင်းဗိမာန်(နေပြည်တော်)
- Myanmar Armed Forces
- For fallen Myanmar soldiers and civilians
- Established: 27 March 2017; 9 years ago
- Location: 19.8053°N 96.2986°E; Zeyarthiri Township, Naypyidaw Union Territory, Myanmar
- Total burials: 0
- Commemorated: 1788

The Memorial to the Fallen Heroes (Nay Pyi Taw) (Burmese: သူရဲကောင်းဗိမာန်(နေပြည်တော်)) is a memorial in Nay Pyi Taw, Myanmar (Burma) to honour and enshrine the inscriptions of the name of Myanmar’s soldiers and civilians who heroically died in their fight for independence and counter-insurgency operations as well as those who died in doing notable and courageous actions for the country. It was opened in March 2017.

== Memorial building ==
The alabaster memorial, 54 feet (16 m) each in length, height, and width and decorated with 34 carvings of Myanmar traditional arts and crafts, was built on a 38.5 acres (16 hectares) hilltop around 3,000 feet (910 m) to the east of the military parade ground. The road leading to the memorial is 1,646 feet (502 m) long, and on the left side of the road is a 24,800 square feet (2,300 m^{2}) wide lake.

Inside the memorial is a 4 feet (1.2 m) long, 4 feet (1.2 m) wide, and 12 feet (3.7 m) feet high alabaster monument. The walls of the memorial have the names of over 2000 fallen soldiers and civilians who received gallantry titles and hero awards such as Hla Thaung, Ma Chit Po, Suk Bahadur Rai, Saw Ba Yi, Za Kaia, and fighter pilot Bo Peter.

== List of notable visitors ==
Date	Distinguished visitor	Nationality	remark, "Message for Memorial"
23 May 2017	Michail Kostarakos	European Union	visited as Chairman of the European Union Military Committee and laid a wreath
2 June 2017	Fang Fenghui	China	visited as a member of the Central Military Commission of China and Chief of the Joint Staff Department of the Chinese People's Liberation Army and laid a wreath
18 September 2017	Surapong Suwan-ath	Thailand	visited as Chief of the Defence Forces of Royal Thai Armed Forces and laid a wreath
2 October 2017	Ngô Xuân Lịch	Vietnam	visited as Vietnam's Minister of National Defence and laid a wreath
8 January 2018	Perry Lim	Singapore	visited as Chief of Defence Force of the Singapore Armed Forces and laid a wreath
20 January 2018	Sergey Shoygu	Russia	visited as Russia's Minister of Defence and laid a wreath
15 June 2018	Wei Fenghe	China	visited as State Councillor and Minister of National Defence of China and laid a wreath
4 September 2018	Birender Singh Dhanoa	India	visited as Air Chief Marshal of the Indian Air Force and laid a wreath
14 June 2019	Rozzano D. Briguez	Philippine	visited as Commanding General of the Philippine Air Force and laid a wreath
22 January 2021	Sergey Shoygu	Russia	visited as Russia's Minister of Defence and laid a wreath

== See also ==
- Martyrs' Mausoleum
- Kandawmin Garden Mausolea
