= Battle of Insein =

1949 battle of the Karen conflict

Coordinates: 16.892715°N 96.097986°E

- Part of the Karen conflict
Date	30 January – 21 May 1949 (3 months and 3 weeks)
Location	Insein, Rangoon, Myanmar
Result	Union of Burma victory

Belligerents
Union of Burma; Communist Party of Burma	Karen National Union

Commanders and leaders
President Sao Shwe Thaik; Prime Minister U Nu; Ne Win; Colonel Kyaw Zaw	Saw Ba U Gyi; Saw San Phoe Thin †

Units involved
Tatmadaw: Burma Army; Southern Command: No. (1) Chin Rifle Battalion; No. (3) Kachin Rifle Battalion; No. (3) Burma Rifle Battalion; No. (5) Burma Rifle Battalion; No. (unknown) Union Military Police Battalion	Karen National Defence Organisation: Unknown numbers of KNDO soldiers; No. (1) Karen Rifle Battalion; No. (2) Karen Rifle Battalion

Strength
4,000	6,000+

Casualties and losses
Over 80 killed and 120 wounded from No. (5) Burma Rifle Battalion including its OC, Major Hla Thaung	-->
- >500 soldiers, civilians, and rebels killed

The Battle of Insein was a 1949 battle during the Karen conflict where the Karen National Defence Organisation briefly captured the town of Insein, 9 miles from Rangoon. After 111 days of intense fighting, the KNDO failed their goal of capturing Rangoon, and retreated into the countryside.

== Prelude ==
During the leadup to Burma's independence from Britain, Karen groups were unwillingly to be in a Bamar-dominated country but faced internal divides over the territory of a Karen state and the extent to which they should respect Bamar demands. With this context, the KNU headquarters ordered the establishment of Karen defence militias, known as Karen National Defence Organisations, on 17 July 1947. In October 1947, the dominant political party of Burma- the Anti-Fascist People's Freedom League (AFPFL), asked the KNU to create a Karen state within Burma, but the KNU refused, demanding more territory.

Following independence, intercommunal violence grew in the Irrawaddy Delta. This violence was blamed on the KNDO by official government accounts, but such incidents were likely carried out by other Karen militias. Prime minister U Nu and Karen leader Saw Ba U Gyi attempted to de-escalate by touring the delta. To build newfound trust, U Nu allowed the KNDO to recapture Twante near Yangon from the Communist Party of Burma. The KNDO successfully took the Twante canal back but Bamar news organisations were badly informed about this operation, leading to many in Yangon to panic about an impending Karen insurrection.

On 1 September 1948, joint KNDO and ethnic Karen military police seized control of Thaton and Mawlamyine. This first move was poorly coordinated and would eventually spark the Karen conflict. Just four days later, the KNDO allowed central government forces to land in Mawlamyine before handing the city back. While the government had doubted the intentions of the KNU, this occupation increased their fears. Conflict increased as a series of retaliatory incidents and massacres escalated following a Bamar militia killing 200 Karens during a Christmas Eve service in a Palaw church.

== Battle ==
On 31 January 1949, the KNU formally declared war on the government and the KNDO was outlawed just four days afterwards. U Nu set up Sitwundan militias who began to demand the KNDOs and ethnic Karen military police to surrender their arms before engaging in battle. The Sitwundans surrounded the KNU headquarters in Insein where local KNDOs had raided the armoury earlier. Nearby KNDOs were called in to defend the quarters with the garrison reaching over 400 members. The KNDO successfully infiltrated Mingaladon airport four miles from Insein, but chose only to capture ammunition. Indian diplomats negotiated a ceasefire between the KNDO and the Burmese military in early February, but it only lasted for three days. The central government attacked Insein with the frigate UBS Mayu from the Hlaing River. During this time, certain portions of the countryside were under KNDO control, including Hinthada District in northern Ayeyarwady Region. KNDO forces also captured Mandalay, Pyin Oo Lwin, Meiktila, Toungoo, and Mawlamyine. The KNDOs in the delta attacked Pyu and Pathein as a distractionary attempt but ultimately failed to do anything but escalate tensions further.

With aid from ethnic Chin, Karenni, Shan, Gurkha, and even Communist fighters, the Battle of Insein eventually ended in the Burmese government's favour. As KNDO positions north of Yangon fell day by day, KNDOs quietly retreated across the Hlaing River and escaped into the countryside.

== Fate of the Karen Rifle Battalions ==
No. (2) Karen Rifle Battalions (Pyay) trying to link up with KNDO was defeated by No. (3) Burma Rifle Battalion at Wet Kaw Bridge, Zigon and advances from No. (1) Karen Rifle Battalion (Taungoo) was also blocked by government forces

== Aftermath ==
Shortly after the battle, the Burmese Army's commander-in-chief, Smith Dun (an ethnic Karen), resigned. The Burmese Army initially being on the verge of total defeat also led to hardline militarists demanding Ne Win to start a coup d'état, which he eventually did in 1962
