= Kawthoolei Armed Forces =

Alliance of armed groups in Myanmar

- ကော်သူးလေတပ်မတော်
- Dates active: 1949-1952; October 2014 – present
- Ideology: Karen nationalism Separatism

The Kawthoolei Armed Forces (Burmese: ကော့သူးလေတပ်မတော်; abbr. KAF) was the name of the armed forces of the self-declared Kawthoolei state in late 1940s during the Burmese civil war. It was recreated in the 2010s as an ethnic Karen rebel alliance.

== Origins and De Facto Disappearance ==
During the leadup to Burma's independence from Britain, Karen groups were unwillingly to be in a Bamar-dominated country In October 1947, the dominant political party of Burma asked the KNU to create a Karen state called Kawthoolei within Burma, but the KNU refused, demanding more territory. After outbreak of violence, the KNU would eventually declare war on 31 January 1949. A Karen state was declared in May of that year and a month later in June, Karen leaders met in Taungoo to form the government of Kawthoolei.

Accordingly on 15 June 1949, the armed forces of the Karen groups where renamed as the Kawthoolei Armed Forces (KAF). The KAF was restructured into two divisions based on pre-existing Karen National Defence Organisation lines- the Eastern Command and the Delta Command. General Min Maung became the KAF's first commander as Kawthoolei's defence minister, heading the Eastern Command with five brigades while General Sein Hmone commanded the Delta Command with four brigades. Later, a fifth Delta Brigade would be formed. The KAF operated primarily through radio communication across the spread out territory as the civil war continued.

In 1952, the central government's military launched a major military operation against the Delta Command of the KAF, burning Karen villages and fields as part of scorched earth tactics. After suffering significant territorial losses and remaining Karen fighters fleeing into the jungle of the Bago Yoma mountains, the KAF further lost significant support from Karen people in the delta. After a string of defections and more territorial defeat, remaining Karen leaders sought a different path and restructuring away from the KAF badge, which had become associated with warlordism and ineffectiveness.

== Proposed Revival and Merger ==
In October 2014, the Democratic Karen Benevolent Army, the KNU/KNLA Peace Council, the Karen National Defence Organisation, and the Karen National Union allegedly decided to unite into the KAF. However, many within the KNU and KNDO leadership swiftly denied that it agreed, claiming that those who joined the KAF made a "personal choice."

=== Tensions ===
After DKBA-5, the KNU/KNLA Peace Council, and the KNLA signed the Nationwide Ceasefire Agreement a year later, a statement ostensibly written by the KAF denounced the NCA for solidifying military rule in Myanmar.

=== 2021 coup d'etat ===
After the 2021 coup, the KNU and DKBA verbally agreed to reunite into the KAF in August 2022 after the latter group's negotiations with the Tatmadaw fell apart.
