= Daw Ohn =

Burmese activist and academic

- အုန်း
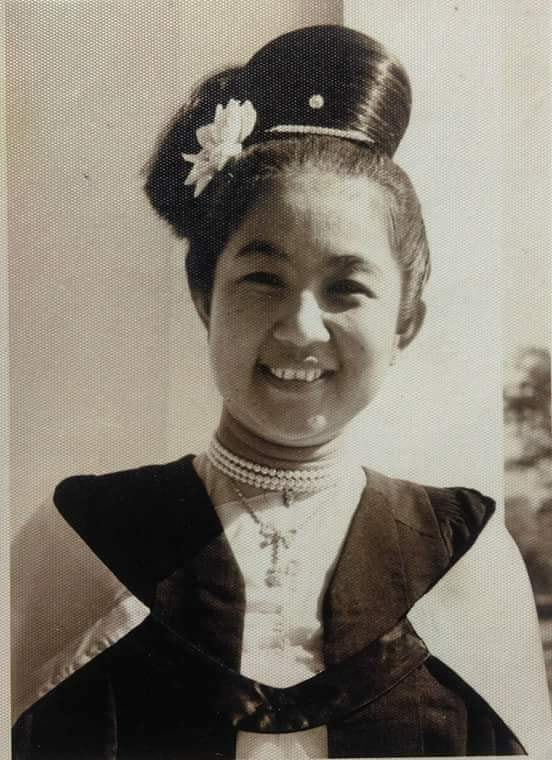
- MA Ma Ohn in 1938
- Born: July 6, 1913; Mandalay, British Burma
- Died: November 28, 2003 (aged 90); Mandalay
- Occupations: Pali linguist Writer
- Parent(s): U Kyaw Ya (father); Daw Daw Khin (mother)
- Awards: Naingngan Gonyi (Second Class)

Academic background
- Education: MA (Pali)
- Alma mater: University of Yangon
- Thesis: (1938)

Academic work
- Discipline: Linguist
- Institutions: Professor and head of the Department of Buddhistic Studies, Mandalay University

Ohn (Burmese: အုန်း, pronounced [ʔóʊɰ̃]; 6 July 1913 – 28 November 2003), known honorifically as M.A. Daw Ohn (Burmese: အမ်အေ ဒေါ်အုန်း), was a 20th-century Burmese activist, scholar and professor who specialized in the Pali language and the oriental studies and served as the head of the Department of Buddhistic Studies at the University of Mandalay from 1958 to 1966. She is regarded as the mother of the Department of Oriental Studies of Mandalay University.

Ohn was one of the founders of independent Mandalay University where she served as the Dean of the Faculty of Arts. She received Naingngan Gonyi (Second Class) order given by the government in 1980.

== Early life and education ==
Ma Ohn, the seventh of eight siblings, was born on 6 July 1913 in Kinsanamahi Quarter, Chanayethazan Township, Mandalay to U Kyaw Ya and Daw Daw Khin. She was educated at the Mandalay Central National High School after completing elementary at the National Women's School where she started her education in 1925. She passed the matriculation examination in 1930 with distinction in two subjects: pāli and mathematics. In 1931, she received the teacher's training certificate for secondary students from the normal school in Mandalay. She read pali and logic at the Mandalay Intermediate College in 1932 and 1933, and went to Rangoon University for a bachelor's degree in pali in 1936.

== Political and educational career ==
When the second university students strike in history broke out in 1936, Ohn and her friend Ludu Daw Amar became famous as women student leaders among the strikers camped out on the terraces of the Shwedagon Pagoda.

Ohn continued her education at Rangoon University in 1937 and completed a master's degree in pali the following year.

From 1936 to 1941, she served as a tutor at the pali department of Rangoon University and deputy-warden of Inya hostel.

Ohn worked as a female president at the youth headquarter of Asian Youth Organization from 30 August 1943 to 4 April 1945. She also served as the first female-group chairperson of Anti-Fascist Organization.

From 1 June 1947 to 31 May 1948, Ohn served as an assistant lecturer at the pali department of Mandalay Intermediate College, and of Mandalay Degree College from 1 June 1948 to 31 March 1951.

Ohn contributed to found the independent Mandalay University, together with Zeya Maung who was its first vice-chancellor. She also served as a lecturer at the pali department of Mandalay University from 1 June 1951 to 18 August 1958. In the year 1958, she became a professor at the Department of Buddhistic Studies until her retirement in 1966.

From 1 October 1957 to 1 April 1958, Ohn served as an acting vice-chancellor of Mandalay University. She also worked as a warden of Shwe Man hostel during her career at the university.

Ohn was invited to China in April and May 1952 as a Burmese representative, led by Tun Pe the minister of culture. She also attended to the eighth session of the Commission on the Status of Women of United Nations Economic and Social Council held from 13 March to 4 April 1953 as a representative from Burma.

On 7 June 1980, Ohn was awarded Naingngan Gonyi (Second Class) order by the Burmese government.

== Death ==
Ohn died on 28 November 2003 at 3:30 pm (MMT) at No. 217, between 30 and 31 street on the 80 road, Mandalay.

== Publications ==
Ohn, with the pen name M.A. Ma Ohn, wrote articles on local journals and magazines. Her well-known linguistic books included "History of Pali Literature" (1950) and English translation of "Cariya Atthakatha" (1956) which was written for the Pali Text Society.
