= Shwesandaw Pagoda =

Shwesandaw Pagoda may refer to:

- Shwesandaw Pagoda (Bagan)
- Shwesandaw Pagoda (Pyay)
- Shwesandaw Pagoda (Taungoo)
- Shwesandaw Pagoda (Thandwe)
- Shwesandaw Pagoda (Twante)
