= Taik Chun =

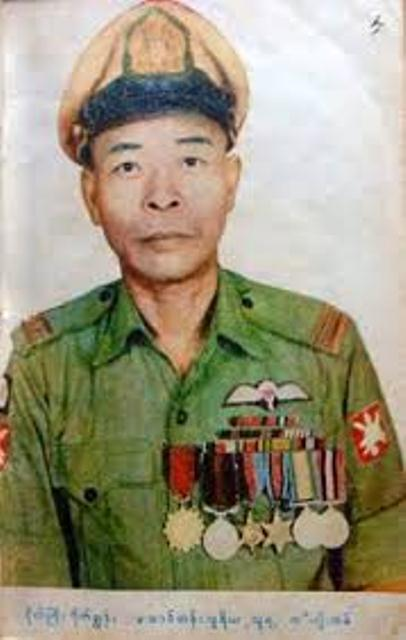
The Guardian of Burma

Captain Aung San Thuriya Thuya Taik Chon, also known as Captain Taik Chon (serial no: BC/5453 and BC/7288), was the only Chin (Matu) soldier to have received both Thuya and Aung San Thuriya Medal, the highest and most prestigious award for gallantry and bravery in the face of the enemy that can be awarded to members of Myanmar Armed Forces. He won the award at the Raid on U Seikkein Monastery at Battle of Insein near during the fight against of Karen insurgency in Myanmar.

The raid on U Seikkein Monastery can be regarded as one of the most prominent part of Battle of Insein. The structural pattern of U Sakkein monastery was something like a systematically built fortress. It was built on a hillock surrounded by other monasteries. The Karen insurgents were using these monasteries on the hillock as their stronghold and taking advantage of the uphill position to open fire on any approaching government forces. Lieutenant Taik Chon and his squad from No. 1 Chin Rifles Battalion (Chin Tha Nat Kine Tat Yin - Chin Tha Na Ka) was ordered to raid the monasteries complex. Lieutenant Taik Chon and four privates raided the fortified insurgents positions in the monasteries and killed numerous insurgents troops. Lieutenant Taik Chon fought bravely against the enemies who are firing upon his small squad from the heavily fortified positions.

Lieutenant Taik Chon was awarded Aung San Thuriya medal in 1950 for his exemplary bravery and honourable sacrifices in face of superior number of enemy forces in the following battles:

1. 10 April 1949 - Battle of Saw Bwar Kyee Gone
2. 16 April 1949 - Battle of U Seikkein Monastery
3. 18 April 1949 - Battle of U Seikkein Monastery

There have only been 6 recipients of Aung San Thuriya Medal in the history of Myanmar. Lieutenant Taik Chun is the only person to be still alive when Aung San Thuriya Medal was awarded while the rest were awarded posthumously.

He was also awarded Thuya medal for his bravery in other battles and promoted to the rank of Captain in 1950.
