= 1948 Karen demonstrations =

Series of peaceful demonstrations organized by the Karen National Union

- Part of Karen conflict
- Date: 11 February 1948
- Location: (Post-independence Burma (1948–1962)) Union of Burma
- Caused by: Karen demands for political recognition and a Karen State
- Goals: Establishment of a Karen State; political equality; prevention of communal conflict and civil war
- Methods: Peaceful demonstrations; silent processions
- Result: No establishment of a Karen State

The 1948 Karen demonstrations were a series of peaceful demonstrations organized by the Karen National Union (KNU) on 11 February 1948 in several towns across Burma, shortly after the country's independence. The demonstrators called for the establishment of a Karen State, political equality between Karen and Burman people, and the prevention of communal violence and civil war.

== Background ==
Karen political organizations had campaigned for political recognition and self-government during the final years of British rule. The KNU, established in February 1947, did not participate in the Panglong Conference. Karen political demands were not entirely uniform: some leaders sought a distinct Karen State, while others disagreed over its proposed territorial boundaries and political status.

On 3 February 1948, KNU president Saw Ba U Gyi and secretary Saw Tha Hto submitted a letter to the Burmese government requesting an independent Karen State. The proposed territory included parts of Tenasserim and Irrawaddy divisions, as well as Hanthawaddy, Insein and Nyaunglebin.

== Demonstrations ==
On 11 February 1948, Karen communities demonstrated in numerous locations, including Myitkyina, Myeik, Namkham, Lashio, Taunggyi, Kengtung, Meiktila and Chauk, as well as towns in Lower Burma.

The demonstrators carried banners displaying four principal slogans:

- "Give Karen State, At Once!"
- "Show Karen One Kyat, Burman One Kyat, At Once!"
- "We Don't Want Communal Strife!"
- "We Don't Want Civil War!"

Karen historical accounts report that more than 400,000 people participated. However, the exact attendance is uncertain; an interview published by Burma News International described the participation as tens of thousands.
