= Chit Po =

Tavoyan woman; only civilian woman to receive the Thura medal for bravery

Thura Ma Chit Po
- ချစ်ပို
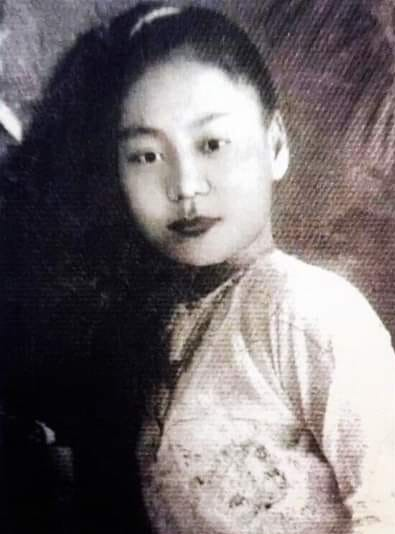
- Born: February 1908; Tabodwe 1269 ME; Tavoy, Tenasserim Division, British Burma
- Died: 8 April 1949 (aged 41); Friday, 11th waxing of Late Tagu 1310 ME; Pyin Oo Lwin; Burma
- Burial place: Pyin Oo Lwin
- Citizenship: Myanmar
- Known for: The only female recipient of the Thura Medal
- Spouse: Hla Maung

Thura Ma Chit Po (Burmese: သူရ မချစ်ပို; February 1908 – 8 April 1949) was a Burmese woman who was the one and only civilian woman to have received the Thura medal for bravery. She gathered intelligence on the Karen National Defence Organisation (KNDO) on behalf of the Myanmar Military before she was caught and executed by the KNDO insurgents.

== Biography ==
Chit Po was born in February 1908 in Tavoy (Dawei), Tenasserim Division. She married Corporal Hla Maung (a cook in No.1 Military Engineer Battalion), in Maymyo (Pyinoolwin) in 1947.

== Service ==
In 1949, the Myanmar Military (Tatmadaw) was fighting against the insurgent group called Karen National Defence Organisation (KNDO).

One of the issues the Tatmadaw had was a lack of access to intelligence. Chit Po, using a variety of disguises, which included a helmet, a cane for herding cows and a sleeping bag, entered the KNDO camp and reported back enemy artillery positions.

Shortly afterwards, Chit Po was arrested, interrogated, and killed by the KNDO on 8 April 1949. She was 41 (in her 42nd year). On 16 May 1949, her body was buried in a military ceremony.

== Legacy ==
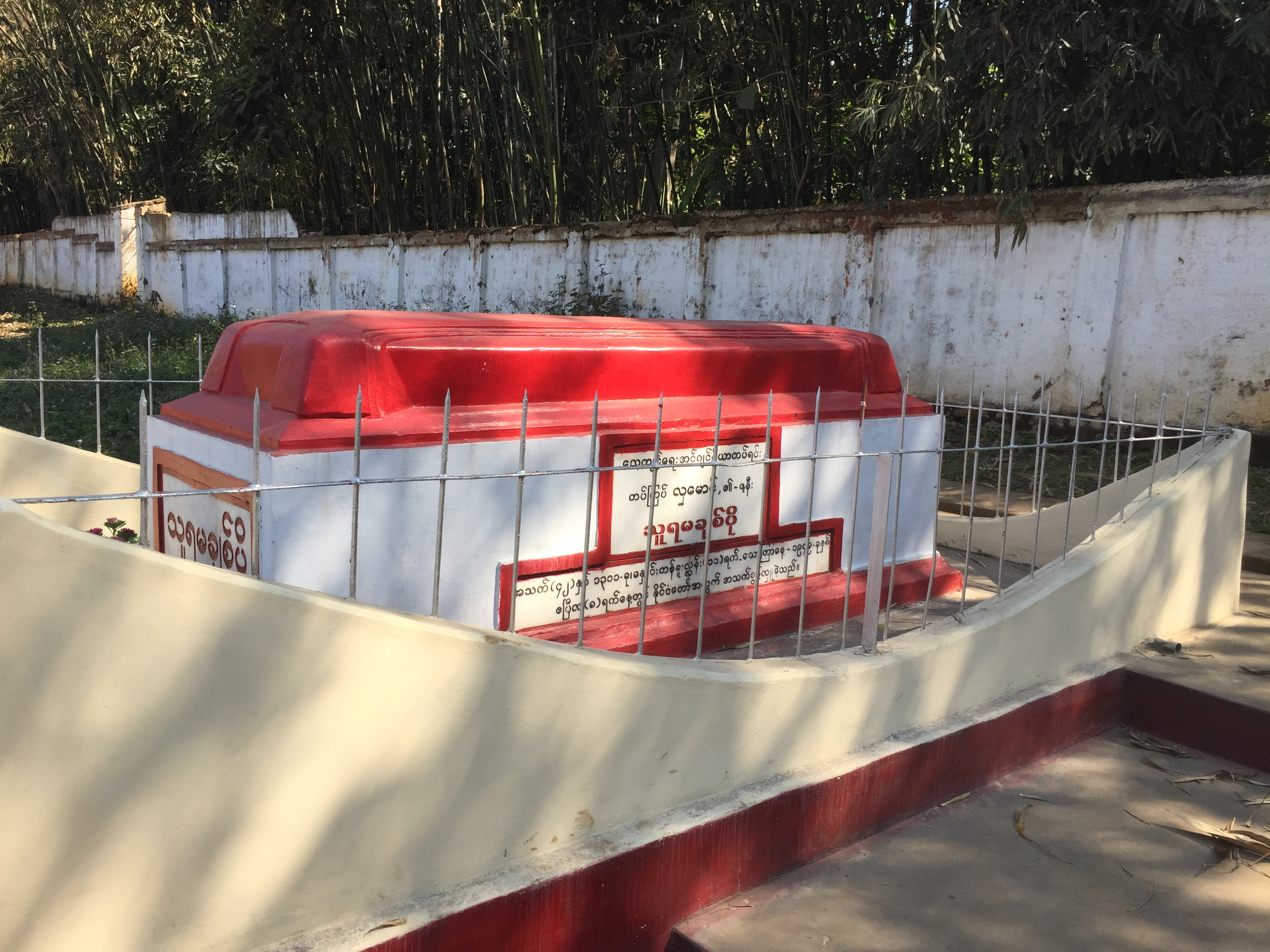
Thura Ma Chit Po's Grave

Chit Po was posthumously awarded the Thura Medal in 1950. She is still the only female recipient of the medal; 516 medals have been awarded to men. Her name is inscribed on the Memorial to the Fallen Heroes (Nay Pyi Taw) in Naypyitaw.

A statue of Chit Po was erected in the Friday Garden in her hometown of Launglon Township, Dawei District, in 2017. The sculptor was Maung Kyaw; the statue is over two metres tall, and shows Chit Po holding a machete and a bag of grenades.

The 110th anniversary of Chit Po's birth was commemorated in Pyin Oo Lwin in February 2018, organised by the Pyin Oo Lwin Township Writers' Association.

Chit Po is the subject of Maymyo Chit Swe's biographical book Thura Ma Phit Po (မြန်မာ့သမိုင်းတွင် တစ်ဦးတည်းသော သူရဘွဲ့ရအမျိုးသမီး သူရမချစ်ပို), first published in 2014. Portrayed by Soe Myat Thuzar in 2017 film Thura Ma Chit Po. In the Hall of Tanintharyi Region, Ma Chit Po is memorialized with a bronze bust.
