= Za Kaia =

Burmese soldier (1926–1949)

- Born: Za Kaia; 1926; Zimte Village, Tedim Township, Chin Hills, British Burma
- Died: 12 December 1949 (aged 23); Nanmekhon Village, Kayah State, Burma
- Military career
- Allegiance: Union of Burma
- Branch: Burma Army, 2nd Burma Rifles
- Service years: 1946–1949
- Rank: Lance corporal
- Units: 2nd Burma Rifles, Company C
- Conflicts: Nanmekhon
- Awards: Thiha Thura

Lance Corporal Za Kaia (1926 - 12 December 1949), (Burmese: ဒုတပ်ကြပ်ဇာကိုင်း) (Burma Army Serial No: 50996) was an ethnic Chin and a recipient of Thiha Thura (lit. 'brave as a lion') medal, the second highest award in Burma (Myanmar) for gallantry and bravery in the face of the enemy. Throughout Myanmar Army history, only 46 servicemen have been awarded this prestigious medal.

== Early life ==
Za Kaia was born in the year of 1926 to Pu Neih Thula and Pi Thang Ngovi, in Zimte village, Tedim Township, Chin Hills, British Burma.

== Military career ==
=== Pre-independence ===
At the age of 20, he joined the 2nd Burma Rifles Battalion and quickly earned the respect of his officers and comrades. He was promoted to the rank of Lance corporal in 1948 and entrusted him as a "Section Commander" i.e. he became a commander of 10 soldiers.

=== Post-independence ===
Burma gained her independence from the United Kingdom in 1948 and deadly civil war soon followed. Za Kaia continued to serve as Lance corporal in the 2nd Burma Rifles.

==== Nanmekhon Battle ====
In December, 1949, the "C" Company (about 150 soldiers) of the 2nd Burma Rifles Battalion marched towards Kayah State to pursue the retreating KNDO insurgent force. Za Kaia and the "C" company departed Nyaunglebin (ညောင်လေးပင်) town in central Burma to frontier area of eastern Burma and soon engaged in a ferocious battle at Nanmekhon village, approximately 6.5miles west of Loikaw on 12 December 1949. As the KNDO force consisted of about 800 soldiers there, "C" Company of 2nd Burma Rifles was soon surrounded as the KNDO force were superiors in both soldier numbers and weapons. Za Kaia bravely fought rebelling force and showed tremendous courage and skill of a good soldier. Za Kaia and his comrades made a defensive line and constantly engaged with the rebelling force. They fought back while the KNDO troops shot them mercilessly. The condition was hopeless as the "C" company was pinned down and KNDO soldiers fired relentlessly.

He then reported to his immediate officer that:

"Captain, if we take defensive position like this, we all will soon be killed and annihilated. So, all of our troop better fall back while me and my section will remain in this defensive position to cover your retreat. I and my section will sacrifice our life so that you can save other soldiers and fight on another day".

The company commander then gave a retreat order as Za Kaia suggested. Za Kaia and his section hold their position and resisted the rebelling force while the whole company was retreating to safety line. He took ammunitions of his fallen comrades and continued shooting, shooting and shooting. The enemy soldiers shouted to him to surrender but he and his section never surrendered and resisted until they all are killed. He and his section had sacrificed their life for their comrades.

== Award ==
Due to his acts of extreme bravery, he was awarded Thiha Thura medal, the second highest gallantry medal in Burma posthumously in 1951 with awarding order number 4/A Htoo (Special)/1951. The then Prime Minister of Burma U Nu, came to Falam, the Capital city of Chin Special Division and handed over this gallantry medal together with Kyats 5,000 as an honorarium to the mother of Za Kaia. His mother received Kyats 40 per month as an honorarium salary for this medal.
