= Twante Canal =

Canal connecting the Irrawaddy River and the Yangon river in Myanmar

Coordinates: 16°43′26″N 95°57′54″E

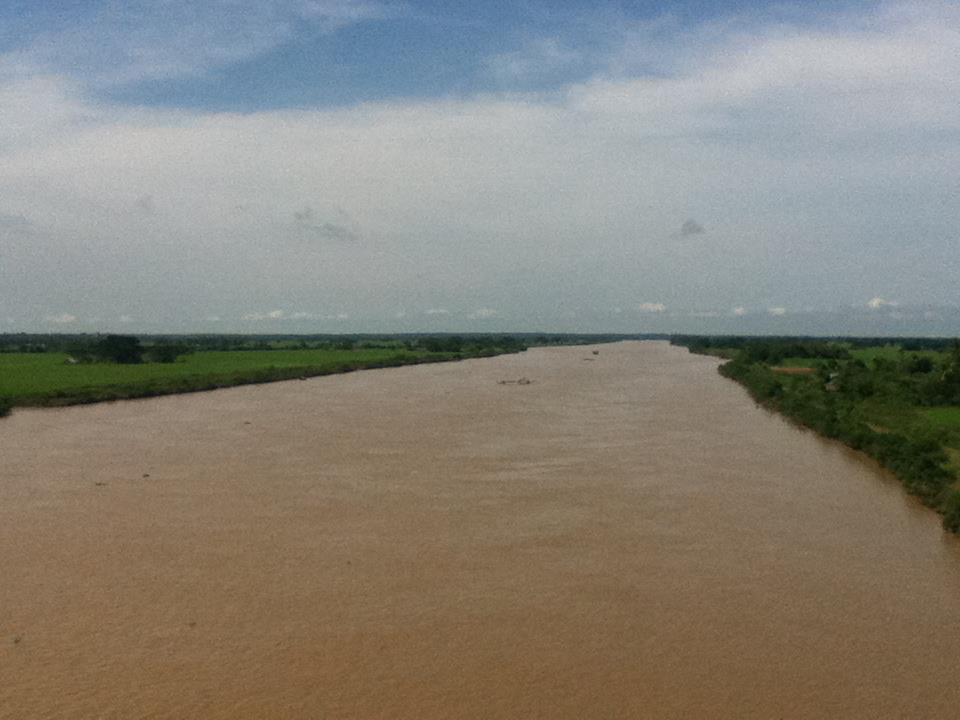
Twante Canal

The Twante Canal (Burmese: တွံတေး တူးမြောင်း [tʊ̀ɰ̃té tú mjáʊɰ̃]) is a canal that connects the Irrawaddy River and the Yangon river in Myanmar. The 35 km (22 mi) canal is a heavily used shortcut between the city of Yangon and the Irrawaddy Division. The canal is named after the town of Twante, located near the canal's midway point. The canal was the quickest route from Yangon to the Irrawaddy Delta until the 1990s when roads between Yangon and the Irrawaddy Division became usable year round. The canal is still heavily used.

Due to the lack of regular maintenance, the canal has become silted and narrower over the years. In 2010, the mouth of the canal was widened by 600 feet (180 m). However, plans to put in concrete embankments were yet to be carried out, and the navigation problems still remain. Twante Bridge is the only bridge that spans the Twante Canal.

== History ==
The construction work on Twante Canal began in 1903 during the British colonial rule. The canal was completed in 1915. The Twante Canal shortened the distance by the Kanaungto creek between Yangon and the Irrawaddy river. The Irrawaddy Flotilla Company, Ltd., which handled nearly all inland carrier traffic in British Burma, ran daily services from Yangon to the Irrawaddy delta and Upper Burma. In 1935, the canal was widened and deepened to allow for the Irrawaddy Flotilla Company's large steamers to Mandalay. Previously larger steam ships had to go out the Yangon river and up one of the larger mouths of the Irrawaddy.

Following Burma's independence from Britain, the canal was briefly occupied by the Communist Party of Burma (CPB) during the start of their armed insurgency. At the same time, Karen militia attacks increased tension in the Irrawaddy delta. Prime minister U Nu and Karen leader Saw Ba U Gyi attempted to de-escalate by allowing the Karen National Defence Organisation to recapture Twante and the canal. However, panic increased in Yangon as badly informed Bamar news organisations reported on this as an impending Karen insurrection. This misunderstanding was one reason for the formal outbreak of the Karen conflict.
