= Bonmazeya =

18th-century Burmese legal scholar and translator

Maha Siri Uttama Zeya Thingyan Bonmazeya
- ကျုံးဝန်ဘုမ္မဇေယျ
- Occupation(s): Legal scholar, jurist
- Era: Konbaung Dynasty
- Known for: Translation and composition of the Manukye Dhammathat (Manurathese Pyathton)
- Notable work: Manukye Dhammathat
- Title: Kyone Wun

Bonmazeya (Burmese: ဘုမ္မဇေယျ) was a politician and legal scholar during Konbaung dynasty who translated and composed the Manugye Dhammathat (also known as the Manurathese Pyathton). It is a translation of the Manusmriti, an ancient Hindu legal text, rendered from Pali into Burmese in 18 parts. It is recognized as one of the most significant legal texts in Burmese jurisprudence. He served as the minister of moats (Kyone wun) under King Alaungpaya's court.

During the reign of King Alaungpaya, Bonmazeya held titles such as Maha Siri Uttama Zeya Thingyan. Although his ancestry and birth date remain unknown, he was highly esteemed as a legal scholar.

In the era of King Alaungpaya, Bonmazeya flourished as one of the highly noted legal scholars, alongside Sindakyawthu U Aw, Shin Lanka Thara, Makara Lawka Khinkyo, Left Minister Binantu, and Atula Sayadaw.

The text, appreciated not only as a legal code but also as a significant Burmese translation, continues to be regarded as an essential work for legal and literary study in Myanmar.
