= Kawthoolei =

Proposed sovereign state for the Karen people of Myanmar

The KNU flag, sometimes used as the flag of Kawthoolei

Kawthoolei (S'gaw Karen: ကီၢ်သူလ့ၤ, lit. 'land without darkness', Pwo Eastern Karen: ခါန်ႋဆူလါင့်; Burmese: ကော့သူးလေ) is the endonym for a proposed state that the Karen nationalists have sought to establish in Myanmar since the beginning of the Karen conflict in the late 1940s. In general, Kawthoolei refers to the aspirational hypothetical state imagined by Karen separatist leaders. The area variously defined as being part of Kawthoolei includes areas where other ethnic groups, such as the Mon people, predominantly live. The Karen National Union (KNU) has pursued the political goal to creating a Kawthoolei State variously over the course of the Karen conflict.

Kawthoolei was first described as an autonomous region for the Karen people to be set up following Burma's independence from the British. But after the outbreak of the Burmese civil war in 1949, it evolved into the name of the territories controlled by the KNU. In 1953, the KNU announced the declaration of the Kawthoolei Free State, based in its capital, Papun. In the 1990s, the KNU chairman Bo Mya re-aligned KNU strategy towards protecting a smaller Kawthoolei territory in Eastern Myanmar based in Manerplaw, establishing his vision of an alternate society to military dominated Myanmar.

Following the 2021 Myanmar coup d'etat, the KNU abandoned its prior ceasefire peace process and focused again on establishing Kawthoolei as a self-governed state. In 2023, they announced their intention for a multi-ethnic and democratic Kawthoolei as part of the federal democratic union and began drafting a constitutional charter that they ratified on 10 April 2026. The charter has neither been made public nor been explained officially.

On 7 January 2026, the splinter armed group Kawthoolei Army declared the independence of the "Republic of Kawthoolei".

== Initial definition ==
The name "Kaw-thu-lay" was used by the government of the Union of Burma in the drafting of its 1948 constitution, which made provisions for an autonomous region for the Karenni people. Questions regarding what a Karen territory would look like and even who counts as part of the Karen ethnicity were questions left unsettled at the time of independence, in part because the Karen National Union had boycotted the elections at the time. While the Karenni and the Shan State were given a right of secession in the constitution, The Karen State was explicitly not allowed to secede. Instead, Article 181 of the Constitution allowed for "Kawthulay" to created as a special region comprising the Salween District and nearby Karen majority areas to be later determined by a special commissioner.

It is unclear as to why the name "Kawthoolei" was adopted. Kawthoolei is not the only name used to refer to a Karen country. The precise meaning of Kawthoolei is disputed even by the Karen themselves. The Pwo Karen use the phrase "Kan Su Line", meaning literally, 'land cool cave'. Kawthoolei, itself, is typically translated as 'A Land without Blemish', but is alternately possible to be interpreted as 'A Land Without Evil' or 'Land of Light'. It can also mean 'Land of the Black Flower' or the 'Garden of Flowers'.

Prior to the 1947 Panglong Conference and the Constitution using the word "Kawthulay", Karen leaders had proposed the formation of an independent state called Karenistan to the British. The British instead had demanded the ethnic groups reach an agreement together.

== History during the Civil War ==
"Republic of Kawthoolei" corresponds to the territory partially administered by the Karen National Union (KNU), which, as of 2017, comprised the Kayin State and parts of the Mon State, Tanintharyi Region, Bago Region, and the Ayeyarwady Division.

The KNU held a conference in Mawlamyine in October 1947 and made the decision with the leadership of about 145,000 people to declare those groups of ethnicities to be the members of the state of Kawthoolei prior to the declaration of independence. The day after independence on 5 January 1948, some Karen leaders had already announced they were seceding as part of the "Republic of Kawthoolei".

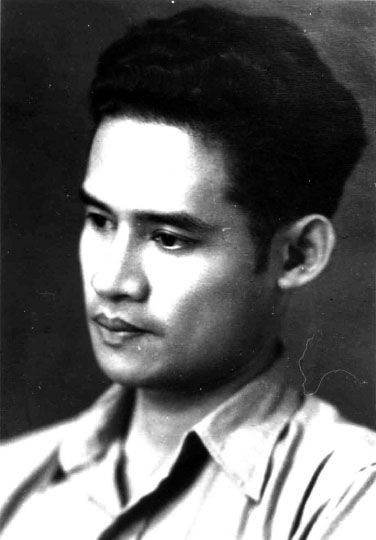
Saw Ba U Gyi, the first prime minister of Kawthoolei

On 31 January 1949, following a series of retaliatory incidents and massacres from the central government, the KNU declared formal war on the government. After their loss at the Battle of Insein, the KNU launched a political campaign from their capital in Taungoo in May 1949. KNU leaders met by June – though the increased attacks from the central government prevent leaders from further Karen territories from attending. All of the military forces under KNU control were renamed to the Kawthoolei Armed Forces (KAF) divided into the Delta and Eastern divisions. At the end of the meeting the Free Karen radio announced the establishment of the provisional Kawthoolei government in Taungoo called the Karen Governing Body. The influential Karen leader Saw Ba U Gyi was announced as its first prime minister. The government was founded with four principles, a variation of which remains the guiding principles of the KNU to this day:

1. Surrender shall not be discussed
2. Karen weapons will remain within Karen hands
3. The Karen political destiny will be created by the Karen
4. The recognition of the Karen State must be completed

In 1952, the Kawthoolei Armed Forces suffered significant territorial defeat in the Irrawaddy Delta. Corruption and warlorism had further tarnished the name and mission of Kawthoolei. As the central government's forces pushed the Karen out of major cities like Thaton, the remaining Karen leaders sought a new path for the movement. In 1953, the Karen National United Party took helm of the KNU and began its decade long process of reforms to set the model for ethnic insurgency throughout the entire Burmese civil war. To start its political consolidation, in 1953 they announced to the Thai government that they were forming the Kawthoolei Free State and seeking recognition from the United Nations. The United States believed the formation of Kawthoolei was part of the a larger Chinese communist strategy to divide Southeast Asia, citing the KNU's close relation with the Communist Party of Burma.

Following the 1962 Burmese coup d'état, political divisions within the KNU had led to a split between the now more socialist Karen National United Party and the nationalist Kawthoolei Revolutionary Council (KRC). General Ne Win, who had seize control of the central government, took advantage of this and brokered a peace treaty with the KRC on 12 March 1964. Within the treaty, Ne Win agreed to retitle Kayin State, the subdivision of Myanmar, as "Kawthoolei State" and introduce ways within the new government to expand Kawthoolei to potentially include parts of Tanintharyi Division and Ayeyarwady Division. However, despite the KRC's call for the KNU to join them in this new future, very few KNU joined in putting down their arms, tarnishing the reputation of the KRC until its disbandment.

In the 1970s, the KNU's chairman, Bo Mya forged a coherent sense of identity in the then territorially fragmented, ethnically diverse and economically poor liberated areas controlled by the KNU. The flag of the KNU was adopted in 1974. The 1974 Constitution of Burma reverted the name of Kayin State from Kawthoolei back to Kayin State.

By the 1980s, this territory, had a stronger identity around the idea of Kawthoolei. Recognising the changing landscape of the revolution and civil war, especially following the influx of educated young Bamar dissidents after the 8888 Uprising coming into Kawthoolei, Bo Mya focused his efforts on created a "mini-state" of liberated territory in the rugged hills of Eastern Myanmar.

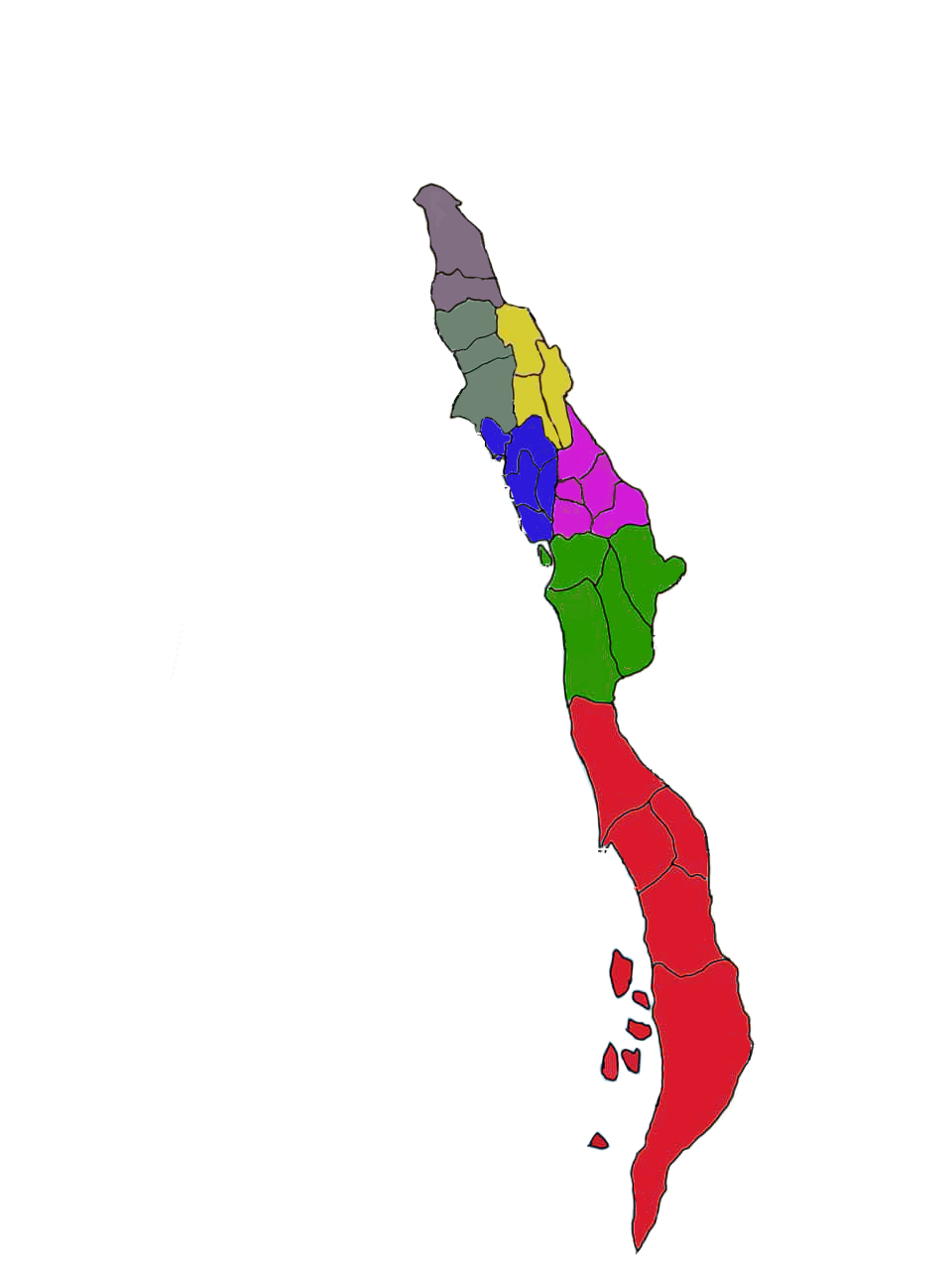
The seven districts of Kawthoolei used by the KNU and its subdivisions

By the 1990s, this area stretching from the Mawdaung Pass to the hills near Taungoo had become a small pocket where this vision of Karen society could be seen by travellers. The network of hospitals, clinics, churches and schools were administered under seven main districts with surprisingly high standards given the conditions of active civil war. Each area was self-sufficient- both as a necessity of war and as an ideological expression countering the authoritarian rule of the central government over the Delta's Karen people. The districts were left largely to their own devices, except for the annual congress in Manerplaw. A variety of nationalist festivals and religious syncretism were celebrated, in contrast to the religious tension that would break the KNU just a decade later. Against observers' recommendations, Bo Mya's vision for Kawthoolei focused less on expanding the war and on protecting this smaller territory. This ultimately led to the complacency amongst the KNU leadership that could not effectively fight back against Myanmar's new military doctrine Four cuts of collective punishment.

In the 2010s, after the Nationwide Ceasefire Agreement with the newly democratic central government, tensions arose over the administration of Kawthoolei territory outside of Kayin State. Disagreement arose over overlapping education, healthcare, social welfare and environmental protection agencies between Kawthoolei and the central government's Mon State, Bago Region and Tanintharyi Regions when the central government expanded their reach into Kawthoolei territory without informing the KNU.

Following the 2021 Myanmar coup d'etat, the KNU abandoned its prior ceasefire peace process and focused again on establishing Kawthoolei as a self-governed state. In June 2023, they announced their intention for a multi-ethnic and democratic Kawthoolei as part of the federal democratic union. Over the next three years, the KNU developed the Kawthoolei Charter to be its constitution through consultation with its own administration officials as well as representatives from civil society and minorities. The KNU announced on 10 April 2026 that the charter had been ratified.

On 7 January 2026, the Kawthoolei Army proclaimed independence from Myanmar and established the Republic of Kawthoolei. The Karen National Union dismissed the declaration as a publicity stunt, stating that the KTLA controls no territory and does not represent the Karen people.

== Administration ==
Despite pressure from civil society groups, the Kawthoolei Charter of the Karen National Union has not been made public as of November 2026. The KNU has also declined to provide any official explanations of the composition or structure of the charter. According to interviews, the charter defines the Kawthoolei Consultative Council with four stakeholders- KNU representatives, parliamentarians ousted by the 2021 coup, non-Karen constituents and youth and women's organisations.

The KNU has 12 administrative departments and multi-departmental committees focusing on issues like displaced IDPs. The newly formed Kawthoolei Governing Council includes seven departments from the KNU's twelve. One of the departments included is the Department for Women, Youth and Children.

The KNU administers the territory through four levels of government- central, district, township and village tract. It contains seven districts and delegates from lower levels elect congressional officials who meet every four years. The Central Standing Committee acts as a legislature in between congress sessions. The KNU also conserves various "kaws" of Kawthoolei- indigenous land to protect wild areas through customary land ownership.

== See also ==
- Karenni people
- Karen people
