= Ludu Daw Amar =

Burmese writer and journalist

- လူထုဒေါ်အမာ
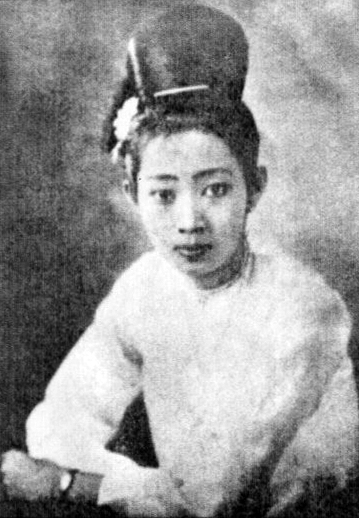
- Portrait of Ludu Daw Amar in her youth
- Born: 29 November 1915; Mandalay, British Burma
- Died: 7 April 2008 (aged 92); Mandalay, Myanmar
- Other names: Khin La Win; Zabudhipar Aung Tun; Aung Naing The Father; Phoe Thar Aung; Mya MyitZu; Amar; Amar (strike student); Student Of Inlya Dormitory
- Occupations: Writer, Author, Journalist
- Spouse: Ludu U Hla
- Children: Soe Win; Than Yin Mar; Po Than Gyaung; Tin Win; Nyein Chan
- Parent(s): U Htin; Daw Su

Ludu Daw Amar (also Ludu Daw Ah Mar; Burmese: လူထုဒေါ်အမာ, pronounced [lùdṵ dɔ̀ ʔəmà]; 29 November 1915 – 7 April 2008) was a dissident writer and journalist based in Mandalay, Burma. She was married to fellow writer and journalist Ludu U Hla and was the mother of popular writer Nyi Pu Lay. She is best known for her outspoken anti-government views and left-wing journalism. She also produced work on traditional Burmese arts, including theatre, dance, and music, and translated several works from English, both fiction and non-fiction.

== Student writer and activist ==
Born into an old established Mandalay family that traded in tobacco and manufactured cheroots, Amar was the fourth in a family of twelve, of whom only six survived to adulthood. She was educated at the American Baptist Mission School and subsequently the National High School under the headmaster Abdul Razak who later became the Education Minister in Aung San's cabinet and was assassinated with him and others in July 1947. She read science at the Mandalay Intermediate College and went on to Rangoon University for a bachelor's degree.

Her first notable work was a translation of Trials in Burma by Maurice Collis in 1938. By that time, she had already been published in the university's Owei (အိုးဝေ, Peacock’s Call) magazine and Kyipwa Yay (ကြီးပွားရေးမဂ္ဂဇင်း, Progress), which was run by her future husband, U Hla, under her own name as well as the pen names Mya Myint Zu and Khin La Win.

When the second university students strike in history broke out in 1936, Amar and her friend from Mandalay M.A. Ma Ohn became famous as women student leaders among the strikers camped out on the terraces of the Shwedagon Pagoda. U Hla was a staunch supporter of the strike and started courting Amar; in 1939, they got married and U Hla moved his magazine to Mandalay.

== Wartime Kyipwa Yay ==
The family fled to the countryside north of Mandalay when the Second World War broke out in the East in 1942, but the magazine continued to come out. Daw Amar translated one of the three wartime bestsellers of the Japanese soldier writer Hino Ashihei called Wheat and Soldiers (ဂျုံနှင့်စစ်သား, Gyon hnint sittha) and published it together with the other two translated by her husband. She also translated The Rainbow (သက်တံရောင်, Thettant yaung) by the Polish-Soviet writer Wanda Wasilewska in 1945, printed on blue matchbox wrapping paper, the only kind of paper available at the time. Both husband and wife became involved in the Resistance movement against the Japanese Occupation, and formed the Asha Lu Nge (အာရှလူငယ်, Asia Youth) organisation in Mandalay. Her husband was arrested briefly by the military authorities after the recapture of the city by the British Fourteenth Army on account of the Hino Ashihei books.

== Postwar Ludu ==
At the end of the war in 1945 U Hla launched a fortnightly paper called the Ludu Journal (လူထုဂျာနယ်) – Ludu is Burmese for 'the people/masses' – with Amar as his assistant editor. The Ludu Daily was successfully launched the following year and the couple subsequently came to be known as Ludu U Hla and Ludu Daw Amar. Their incisive political commentaries and analyses made a significant contribution to the country's yearning for independence and unified struggle against colonial rule. Their publications had never carried advertisements for alcohol, drugs to enhance sexual performance or gambling, nor racing tips, salacious affairs and gossip. U Hla had to be persuaded to make an exception of film advertisements for the survival of the paper.

One morning in 1948, soon after Burma gained her independence from Britain, however, the Kyipwa Yay Press in Mandalay was dynamited to rubble by government troops who were angry that the Ludu couple appeared to be sympathetic to the Communists. This was a time when regime change happened quite often with the city falling into the hands, in turn, of the Karen rebels, Communists and the new Socialist government under U Nu. The entire family, including two pregnant women, was thrown out into the street, lined up and was about to be gunned down when a number of monks and locals successfully intervened to save their lives.

In 1953 Amar travelled abroad to the World Democratic Women's Conference in Copenhagen, World Peace Conference in Budapest, and 4th World Festival of Youth and Students in Bucharest. In October 1953 the Anti-Fascist People's Freedom League (AFPFL) government of U Nu imprisoned U Hla under Section 5 for sedition as a political prisoner after publishing a controversial news story in the paper and he spent over three years in Rangoon's Central Jail until his release in January 1957. They had five children by now, with the youngest Nyein Chan ( his given name means 'peace' in Burmese, pseudonym Nyi Pu Lay b. 1952) barely a toddler. In March 1959 the paper was sealed off by the authorities, and it did not come out again until May the next year. Amar travelled to Moscow in 1962 as an invited guest by Aeroflot Russian Airlines and visited East Germany, Czechoslovakia and China. U Hla and Daw Amar were well known to foreign students of Burmese as well as Burmese writers, journalists and artists; the younger generation of budding writers and artists called them 'U-Lay' (Uncle) and 'Daw Daw' (Aunty). Their home, Ludu Taik (Ludu House) on 84th and 33rd, and always open to such visitors, was often their first port of call in Mandalay.

== Military era ==
A poem for the "Mother of Mandalay" – 85th. birthday tribute, November 2000

The Ludu Daily was closed down by the military government on July 7, 1967. The paper had openly championed for peace and a socialist society, and came out very strongly in support of the peace parley in 1963 between the Revolutionary Council government of Ne Win and various insurgent groups, both Communist and ethnic, just as they had done before in the early years of the civil war in the 1950s. When the peace talks broke down, Amar's oldest son Soe Win (b. 1941), aged 22 and a student leader at Rangoon University, went underground with a few others to join the Communist Party of Burma. He was killed in a bloody purge in 1967 in the jungles of Bago Yoma mountains when the CPB carried out its own cultural revolution. The Ludu couple, true to Burmese Buddhist attitude to death, declined an invitation from the authorities to visit their first born's jungle grave. Their second son Po Than Gyaung (b. 1945) was also arrested for alleged clandestine student political activities at Mandalay University in July 1966, aged 21, and detained without charge or trial until May 1972. He spent part of his imprisonment in Mandalay Prison and later on Cocos Island Penal Colony in the Andaman Sea.

They were personally known to Ne Win from the early days, and the latter often called at their place whenever he visited Mandalay. They carried on with writing, researching, organising literary seminars, giving talks and publishing material other than domestic politics, and remained active in social and community affairs. In 1975 they accepted the government's invitation to give talks to university students from both Mandalay and Rangoon taking part in the reconstruction of the temples in Bagan damaged by the great earthquake of the same year. Amar was given the epithet 'tough by name, tough by nature' by some people (amar means 'tough/hardy' in Burmese).

== Publications ==
Daw Amar had written several books including biographies, travelogues, treatises on traditional Burmese culture, and numerous articles in various magazines, some of them autobiographical and many collected into books later.

1. Trials in Burma by Maurice Collis : 2 volumes (1938) (Translated Work)
2. Sandamala by Maurice Collis (1940) (Translated Work)
3. Wheat and Soldiers by Hino Ashihei (1945) (Translated Work)
4. The Rainbow by Wanda Wasilewska (1945) (Translated Work)
5. The Challenge of Red China by Gunther Stein in 2 volumes (1949) (Translated Work)
6. Thamada Ho Chi Minh – President Ho Chi Minh (1950)
7. In the Name of Peace by Archie John Stone (1953) (Translated Work)
8. Hsoshalit taingpyi mya tho – To the Socialist States (1963)
9. Listen Yankees by C. Wright Mills (1963) (Translated Work)
10. Cash and Violence in Laos by Anna Lewis Strong (1963) (Translated Work)
11. Pyithu chit thaw anupyinnyathemya – Artistes that People Loved (1964)
12. The Other Side of the River by Edgar Snow (1966) (Translated Work)
13. Aung Bala, Po Sein, Sein Gadoun – About Burmese Performer with the same name (1967)
14. Shwe Yoe, Ba Galay – About Burmese Performer with the same name : 2 volumes (1969)
15. Shweman Tin Maung – About Burmese Performer with the same name : 2 volumes (1970)
16. Anyeint – Traditional Burmese theatrical performances : 2 volumes (1973)
17. Gaba akyizoun sa ouk – The World's Largest Book (1973), English translation by Dr. Than Tun (1974)
18. Shwedaungtaung Articles (1975), translated into Japanese by Yasuko Dobashi aka Yin Yin Mya (1994)
19. Sayagyi Thakin Kodaw Hmaing – Biography of Thakin Kodaw Hmaing (1976)
20. Memoirs of China in Revolution by Chester Ronning (1979) (Translated Work)
21. Chindwin hma pinle tho – From the Chindwin to the Sea: a travelogue (1985)
22. African Short Stories (1989)
23. Myanma Mahagita – Grand Classical Music of Burma (1989)
24. Taung Asha pyudinbauk mya – Windows of South Asia (1990)
25. Thai Short Stories in 2 volumes (1992–1993)
26. Mandalaythu Mandalaytha mya – Folks of Mandalay (1991)
27. Yadanabon Mandalay, Mandalay, Kyama do Mandalay – Yadanabon Mandalay, Mandalay, Our Mandalay (1993)
28. Thathana dazaun Sayadaw gyi mya – The Grand (Buddhist Abbots): the Light of Sasana (1994)
29. Kyama do nge nge ga – When We Were Young (1994)
30. Gaba akyizoun kyauk sindudaw – The World's Highest Buddha Statue (1996)
31. Myanma hkithit bagyi – Modern Burmese Art (1997)
32. Amei shaysaga – The Old Sayings of My Mother : 2 volumes (1997), vol 3 (2007)
33. Shissè thoun hnit shissè thoun khun latkensasaunmyar – Eighty Three Years Eighty Three Speeches Leaflet (1998)
34. Nge ga kyun dè hkinpunthe tho – To My Husband My Young Love (2001)
35. Hsè hnapwè zaythe hnint kyama do anya – The Twelve-Season Festival Traders and Our Anyar (Upper Burma) (2002)
36. Lwanthu sa – Letter of Craving (2003)
37. Sa ouk sainga luwin luhtwet atway amyin hsaungba mya – Articles on the Influx and Outflow Perspectives of Bookstores (2004)
38. Mya Myint Zu Short Stories (2006)

== Famous dissident ==
People's Mother at 90 – Ludu Daw Amar's 90th. birthday book of tributes

Daw Amar had been very outspoken against the military regime particularly in her later years. She was arrested together with her husband and their youngest son Nyein Chan in 1978, after her second son Po Than Gyaung went underground to join the Communist Party of Burma (current spokesman for the CPB) just like his late brother Soe Win before him in 1963. Daw Amar and Nyein Chan were not released for more than a year from prison until later in 1979 after U Hla had been released. Nyein Chan was re-arrested in December 1989 this time to spend nearly 10 years in prison. Po Than Gyaung, now living in exile in Yunnan, would never see his mother again.

U Hla died in 1982 after 43 years of marriage, five children and six grandchildren. The Ludu couple had been one of the best known husband-and-wife teams among the Burmese literati. Daw Amar suffered another loss when her printing plants and warehouses burnt down in the great fire of 1984 that wiped out the heart of Mandalay. Since she turned 70 in 1985, Daw Amar's birthday had been celebrated by the world of art and literature in Burma every year. The event had become an unofficial convention of dissidents under the watchful eyes of the ever-present Military Intelligence Service, normally taking place at Taung Laylone Monastery by the shores of Taungthaman Lake in Amarapura near Mandalay until November 2006 when the venue had to be changed under pressure from the authorities. She remained active in public life and was instrumental in founding the Byamazo Luhmuyay Athin (Mutual Voluntary Aid Association) in 1998 engaged in helping poor families with the cost of healthcare and funeral arrangements. She had been called 'Mother of the People' and 'Grand Old Lady'. In a society where old age is revered, most people would address her as Amei (Mother) the same as she would refer to herself according to Burmese custom.

"For those of us who don't dance to the tune of the authorities, we must be creative in what we write to get our message across" she said confirming that there was no freedom of press in Burma. She regretted that she had to give up journalism, and could only write about tradition and culture. In her articles collected later into "Mother's Words of Old", she bemoaned the loosening of social cohesion, morals, and traditional values in dress and manner which she blamed on economic disorder, consumerism and globalisation, and Chinese immigration. She once wrote that the Chinese had occupied Mandalay without firing a shot, and had dubbed the present Lawpan (boss in Chinese) era; she felt as if Mandalay was an undeclared colony of Yunnan Province. Daw Amar was a staunch defender of Burmese history, culture, religion and sovereignty embodied in her birthplace, the last royal capital of Burma, Mandalay – thus broadly nationalistic, religious and ethnocentric traditionalist in her perspective, and yet she had been in the forefront of modernising the written language, fostering mutual understanding and friendship between the dominant Bamar and the ethnic minorities in tandem with her husband, promoting sex education and public awareness of the HIV/AIDS problem, and voicing complaints regarding unpaid labour contributions of women in society.

Ludu Daw Amar died on 7 April 2008 at the age of 92. Her home was Ludu Taik in Mandalay with her second daughter Tin Win (b. 1947) in charge of the publishing business and her youngest son Nyein Chan (writer Nyi Pu Lay – b. 1952) and his family. Her oldest daughter Than Yin Mar (b. 1943), a retired professor of medicine who has also started writing assuming one of her mother's old pen names Mya Myint Zu, looked after her health. She was survived by her two sons, two daughters and six grandchildren.

== See also ==
- Ludu U Hla
