= Aye Cho =

Burmese soldier (died 1948)

Aung San Thuirya Aye Cho
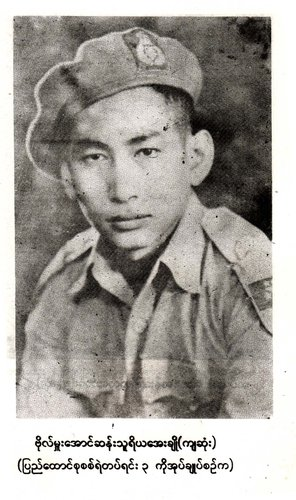
- Died: 21 August 1948
- Military career
- Allegiance: Myanmar
- Branch: Myanmar Armed Forces
- Rank: Major
- Unit: No. 21 Union Military Police Battalion
- Awards: Aung San Thuriya

Major Aung San Thuirya Aye Cho (also known as Aye Cho) (died 21 August 1948) was a Burmese soldier. He was the Bamar recipient of Aung San Thuriya Award, the highest and most prestigious award for gallantry and bravery in the face of the enemy that can be awarded to members of Myanmar Armed Forces and he is also the first recipient of Aung San Thuriya medal in Myanmar. He won the award at the Battle of Po Tha Aung Gon Bridge during the outbreak of Communists insurgency in Myanmar.

In August 1948, a large number of Communist insurgents troops were advancing along the Pyay-Yangon road to attack and seize the city of Yangon. On 19 August 1948, communists forces arrived at Po Tha Aung Gon Bridge near Nattalin, and met with a strong resistance from the soldiers of the No. 21 Union Military Police Battalion that was stationed in Nattalin. Commanding Officer of the battalion Major. Aye Cho led his troops to courageously defend the bridge and the town, which was critical for communists forces to advance towards Yangon. Despite overwhelming number of enemy forces, which outnumbered his small police battalion 30 to 1. The men of the No.21 UMP under the leadership of Major. Aye Cho fought back ferociously and as result the enemy had to retreat from the bridge. Major. Aye Cho was mortally wounded in the battle and he died on the morning of 21 August 1948. For his supreme sacrifice, valiant courage and uncommon valour, Major Aye Cho was awarded Aung San Thuriya medal posthumously.
