= Four cuts =

Burmese military doctrine

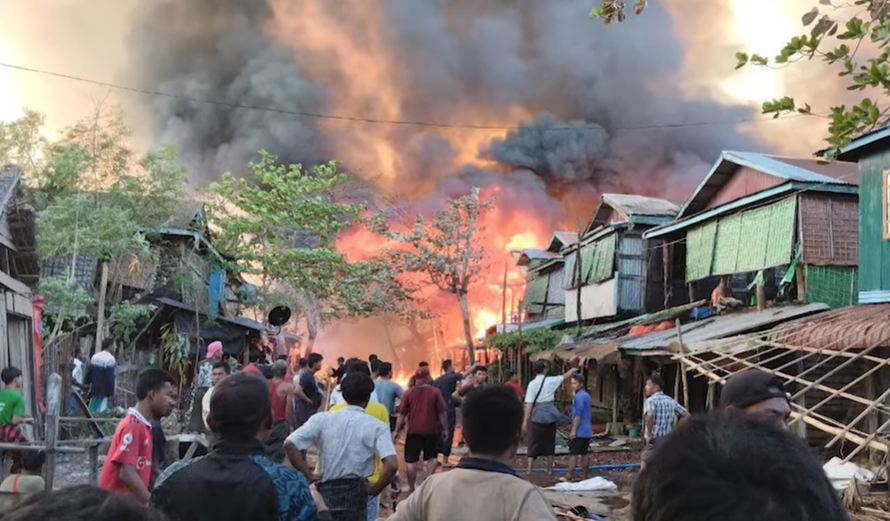
Air Force bombing of a village in Kyauktaw Township, 2025

The four cuts strategy (Burmese: ဖြတ်လေးဖြတ်) is a military doctrine of the Tatmadaw (the military of Myanmar) that consists of violent collective punishment against civilians perceived to have ties to insurgent groups. The strategy has its origins in the 1960s in the internal conflict in Myanmar and has been used multiple times since.

The name refers to "cutting" off four types of supplies to insurgents: food, funds, information and recruitment. The doctrine functioned based on clearing areas of intermittent rebel control and breaking insurgent networks with the locals. The early decade of the doctrine's use saw it more in the form of a formal military operation with newly formed Light Infantry Divisions performing shock operations to take a town and make it impossible for the insurgents to return with threats and monitoring of the remaining population. Through this method, the Tatmadaw was able to effectively break apart large areas of rebel control into manageable areas.

It also involved forcibly relocating villagers into military-controlled towns and villages. For villages that were cooperating with the new campaign, civilians were recruited into people's militia with schoolchildren made to participate in military drilling to fight the rebels. This particular aspect of the Four Cuts has been the most effective component in the Tatmadaw's counterinsurgency efforts after 1975. It removed villagers' ability to remain neutral and created deep and personal tensions between the communities supportive of the insurgents by forcing them to work against the insurgents or face their own deaths. The Four Cuts strategy differed from prior counterinsurgency operations in that it targeted civilians and functioned on a military doctrine branding civilians and insurgent sympathisers as military targets.

== History ==
The doctrine was introduced at a Tatmadaw conference after the failure of the mid 1960s peace attempts based on their assessment that Myanmar's rebels gained their strength from their strong relations with locals. The first use of the doctrine, as a prelimary test before its formal adoption, was in 1966 against the Kachin Independence Organisation (KIO) in General Ne Win's counterinsurgency campaign in the Nagal hills and the Hukawng valley where it was used as scorched earth policy.

The Four Cuts doctrine began with a change in language from the central government, calling insurgents as saboteurs, racists or bandits rather than as rebels. The Tatamadaw divided the country into regional military commands, with a colour-coding system to determine the specific tactics based on the amount of rebel control in each command. This system was based on the Strategic Hamlet Program in Vietnam and remains largely the same to this day. Millions of rural peasants and villagers were forcibly relocating to villages under their control. Those who refused were threatened to be brandied insurgents who were to be shot on sight. This was based on the doctrine's thinking that every community must be fighting against, fleeing from or joining the Tatmadaw with no room for neutrality. To spearhead these operations the Light Infantry Divisions were created starting in 1966, forming shock troops who were trained to have few issues about respecting locals.

In the military's counterinsurgency campaign against the Karen National Union (KNU), the Tatmadaw targeted every person suspected of having ties, indiscriminately destroyed food and aid that could support the KNU and arrest people suspected of providing aid and food and engaged in widespread sexual violence and forced relocation. According to independent security research Kim Joliffe, the strategy was crucial to forcing the KNU to regroup to its current bases in southeastern Myanmar and leave western Ayeyarwaddy Region holdings. In Ayeyarwaddy, several watch towers were erected and mobile columns constantly patrolled the delta clearing town by town. With a strict control over recently cleared areas, the CPB and KNU were cut off from food, support and contact with family until they surrendered, died or came out of hiding. Testimony from Karen refugees entering Thailand in 1975 suggests that there was a quota imposed with certain amount of villagers "having to die" every year as part of the Four cuts campaign in Karen state.

The bulk of the Four Cuts strategy was used to clear out the CPB stronghold in the Bago Yoma in the late 1960s. After sustained success in the delta, Operation Moe Hein was launched in 1968 cornering off portions of the delta and encircling possible areas of insurgent control. The operation was carried out by the recently formed 88th Light Infantry Division who rapidly cut off escape routes and trapped Karen National Defence Organisation militias. Most seriously for the insurgents, the Tatamadaw had managed to block off routes back down to the delta during an emergency meeting held by the CPB and KNU further into the mountains, trapping crucial leadership. In 1969, the Tatmadaw was able to take the CPB stronghold in Myaungmya District, cutting off escape routes and killing many experience organisers from the CPB. By 1974, the CPB and the KNU had been effectively removed as a threat from the southwest, and more importantly, their village networks had been either destroyed or isolated.

In 1976, the Tatmadaw launched one of the largest Four Cuts operations against the Communist Party of Burma (CPB) commander Thet Tun who had established a new base of operations in northern Rakhine State. Thet Tun's forces were able to remain strong despite the decline of the CPB by strategic avoidance of head-on conflict and his own tactical abilities. However, he was eventually forced to surrender in 1980 after a four year long retreat due to the Tatmadaw's Four Cuts campaign which reduced his ability to find local recruit and support.

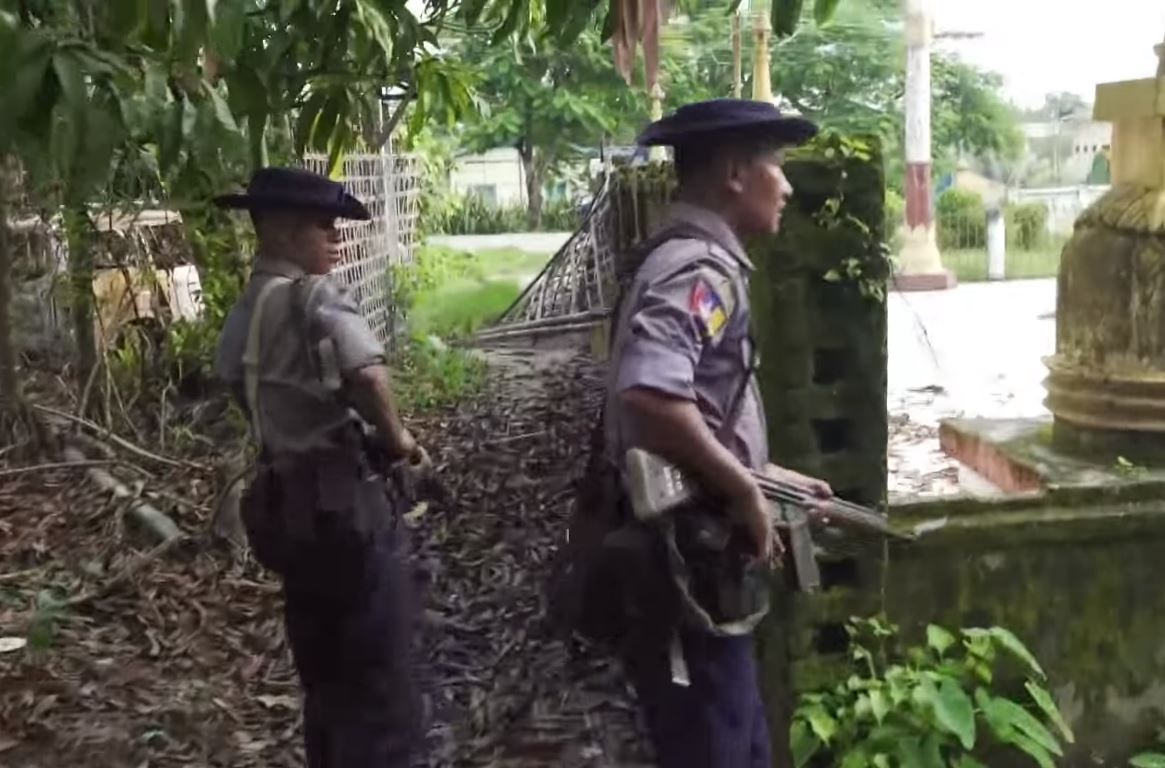
Police patrols in Maungdaw, 2017

In the 1990s, under the rule of General Than Shwe, systematic surveillance and travel restrictions were also imposed as part of the Four Cuts Doctrine in areas near insurgent activity. The strategy was also used in 2011 against the KIO and in the Rakhine conflict, including as part of the lead up to the 2017 Rohingya genocide.

Following the 2021 myanmar coup d'état, the Tatmadaw applied the Four cuts doctrine to the new People's Defence Forces (PDF) who took over rural portion of Sagaing Region. As part of its war, the Tatmadaw launched indiscriminate airstrikes, burned civilian homes and cut off vital items to severely limit humanitarian access to the civilian populations under the control of the rebels. In 2023, the military struggled to control southeastern Myanmar and deployed the Four Cuts strategy to wage a scorched-earth campaign to demoralise communities in Mon state. The military pursued a campaign of deliberate violence with the goal of breaking down society in areas sympathetic to the resistance by attacking schools, hospitals, places of worship, shops and rice fields. In the 2020s, the strategy also involved cutting mobile data and networks in areas where clashes are frequenting to spread misinformation and to hunt down suspected civilians.

According to aid workers and activists such as Thinzar Shunlei Yi, Min Aung Hlaing's Union Government of Myanmar tightened restrictions on the distribution of menstrual pads on 20 April 2026. Although pro-government sources gave no official response, potential reasons include purported first-aid use by rebel forces. As a result, women are reportedly resorting to unsafe improvisations such as leaves or rags; black market sanitary prices observably tripled.

== See also ==
- Briggs Plan
- List of massacres in Myanmar
- War crimes during the Myanmar civil war (2021–present)
- Mo So massacre
