= Burmese Gurkha =

People of Nepali origin settled in Burma

Burmese Gurkhas
ဂေါ်ရခါးလူမျိုးများ (Burmese) bamar gu r hk गोरखाली (Nepali) Barmī gōrkhā
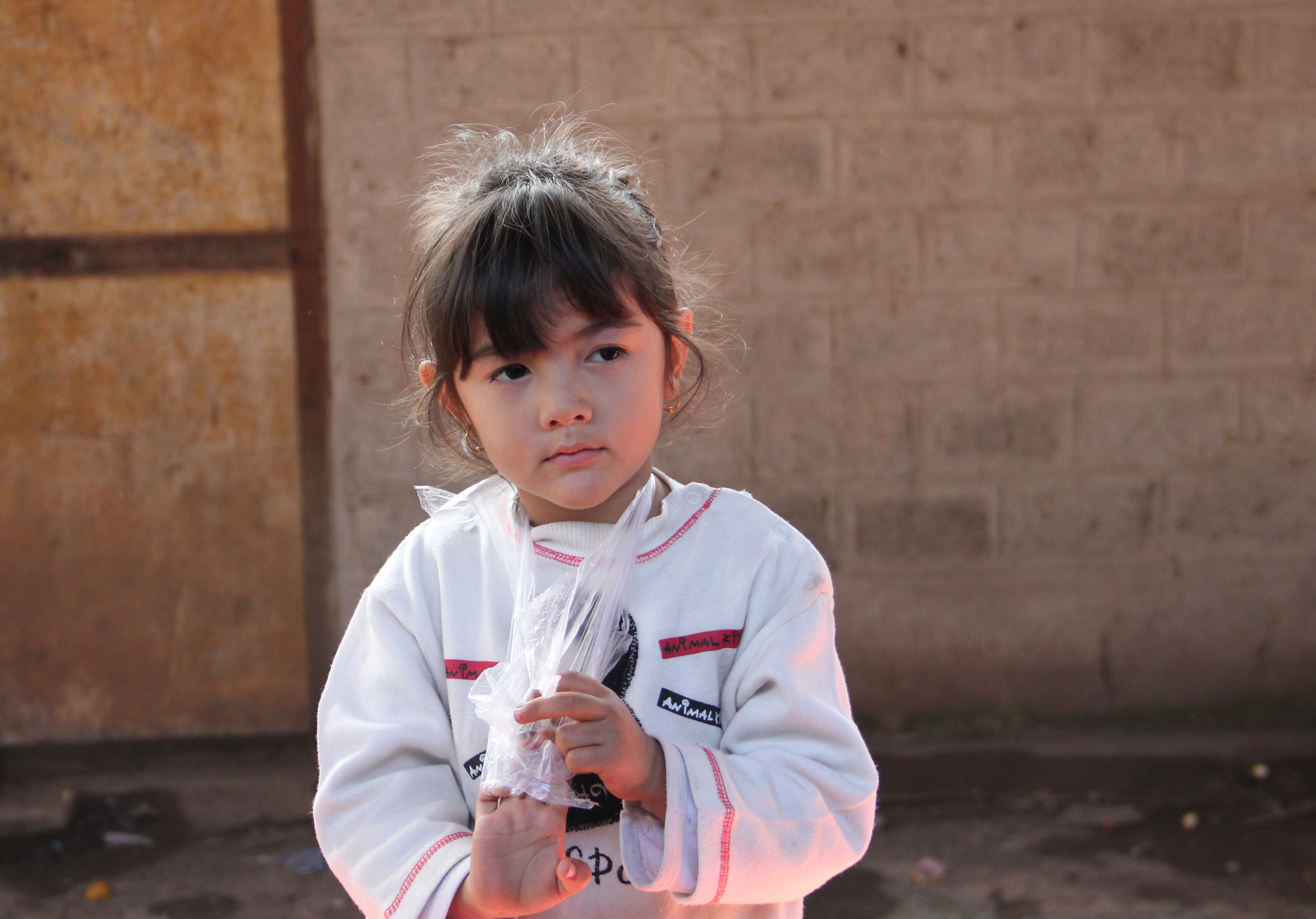

Regions with significant populations
- Myanmar, Yangon, Mandalay, Mogok, Pyin Oo Lwin, Taunggyi, Mandalay Division, Shan State, Kachin State

Languages
- Burmese and Regional Languages

Religion
- Hinduism; Buddhism

Related ethnic groups
- Nepalese peoples and Indian Gorkhas

Burmese Gurkhas (Burmese: ဂေါ်ရခါးလူမျိုးများ; Nepali: गोरखाली) are a group of Nepali-speaking Burmese people living in Myanmar (formerly Burma). While the Gurkhas have lived in Burma for many centuries, it was during the British rule in Burma, that the majority of the Gurkhas migrated from Nepal.

The estimated population of Gurkha is nearly 3 lakhs. The majority of Gurkha now reside in Yangon (Rangoon), Mandalay, Pyin U Lwin, Mogok, Tamu, Kalaymyo, Taunggyi, Myitkyina and other parts of the country.

== History and demography ==
Like many other people who reside in Myanmar and who have their origin in Nepal, the majority of Gurkha came along with the British administration. Many Gurkhas served during the Second World War in the Burma Campaign, especially as rear guard units for the British retreat from Burma.

After Burma's independence in 1948, the Gurkhas joined the new Burma Army. Many Gurkhas have served in the new republic's various campaigns against ethnic insurgents and the Kuomintang invasions. The Gurkha were considered key assets of the Burmese Army in the 1950s. There was also a soldier named Suk Bahadur Rai † that won the highest honor of Tatmadaw, The Aung San Thuriya Medal.

In the Myanmar civil war, many Gurkhas fight for the Kachin Independence Army.

== Culture ==
Many of Gurkha in Myanmar practice Hinduism and Buddhism. A very small number of them practice Christianity. There are a few Gurkha Hindu temples and Buddhist monasteries in the cities around Kachin State, Shan State, Yangon and Mandalay. Gurkha form a large minority in Myitkyina, Mogok, and the hill station of Pyin U Lwin (Maymyo).

=== Language ===
Most Gurkha typically speak Nepali and Burmese languages.

=== Education ===
The Gurkha place high importance on education, and they represent a disproportionately high share of those with advanced (medical, engineering or doctorate) degrees in Burma.

== Notable Gurkha people in Burma ==
- Private Aung San Thuriya Suk Bahadur Rai – No.4 Burma Regiment (4th Gurkha) Myanmar Army. – recipient of the Aung San Thuriya award, the highest gallantry award in Myanmar.
- Suk Bahadur (Burmese: ဗဟာဒူး) is a Burmese footballer who served as the captain of the Myanmar national football team (1952–1970). He is considered the greatest Burmese footballer that ever lived. He was also a major in Myanmar Army
- Nandar Gyawali, Podcaster, human rights activist and feminist activist
