= Saw Ba Yi =

- Native name: စောဘရီ
- Died: 1951
- Allegiance: Union of Burma
- Rank: civilian
- Awards: Aung San Thuriya

Saw Ba Yi (Burmese: စောဘရီ [sɔ́ ba̰ jì]) was an ethnic Karen and the only civilian to have won the Aung San Thuriya Medal, the highest award for gallantry and bravery in Burma (Myanmar) in 1951. Under normal circumstances, the medal is only awarded to members of the Myanmar Armed Forces.

== Service to the country ==
Saw Ba Yi volunteered in saving a group of government officials sieged by KNDO rebels in Thandaung in 1951. Though his acts of valour and self-sacrifice preserved the lives of hostages, he was killed in action. He was honoured and awarded the medal posthumously by the President of Burma then.

== Commemorations ==
- Aung San Thuriya Saw Ba Yi Street in downtown Yangon is named in his honour.
