= Hla Thaung =

Awarded the Aung San Thuriya

- လှသောင်း
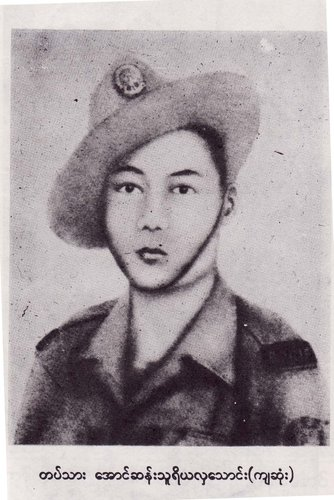
- Born: Magyidan Quarter, Kungyangon Township, Rangoon Division, British Burma
- Died: 28 April 1949; Daik-U, Pegu Division, Burma
- Military career
- Allegiance: Union of Burma
- Branch: Myanmar Army
- Service years: 1947-1949
- Rank: Private
- Unit: 3rd Burma Rifles Battalion
- Conflicts: Rakhine Yoma; Irrawaddy delta; Battle of Insein; Battle of Daik-U
- Awards: Aung San Thuriya

Private Aung San Thuriya Hla Thaung (Burmese: လှသောင်း [l̥a̰ θáʊɰ̃]; died 28 April 1949) of 3rd Burma Rifles Battalion (Bama Thenatkaing Tatyin - Tha Na Ka) (Serial 88865) was a recipient of Aung San Thuriya Award, the highest and most prestigious award in Myanmar (Burma) for gallantry and bravery in the face of the enemy. He won the award at the Battle of Daik-U during the fight against of Karen insurgency in Myanmar.

On the early hours on 28 April 1949 at the Daik-U battlefront, HQ company of 3rd Burma Rifles Battalion was encircled by the attacking KNDO forces with much greater strength supported by artillery. Private Hla Thaung gallantly fought back the insurgents to defend the HQ company. He fought with bravery and risk his life while killing large numbers of enemy troops and halting the enemy advances towards the position of HQ Company. Private Hla Thaung provided cover fire for the troops of the 3rd Burma Rifles Battalion as they retreated safely from the encircled position, holding a Bren GPMG Gun in his hand and shooting non-stop till his final dying breath. He fell during this battle and when his comrades found his body after the battle, his fingers were still tightly gripped to the trigger of his Bren Gun. He was awarded Aung San Thuriya medal (Order No. 10/A Htoo/50) for his selfless valour, sacrificing his life in order to save the lives of his comrades and bravery in face of superior number of enemy forces.

Before the battle of Daik-U, Private Hla Thaung fought bravely against the insurgents in the battles of Rakhine Yoma, Irrawaddy Delta Region, Zeegon, Wetkaw and Insein.

== Family ==
Hla Thaung was born to U Than Maung and his wife, Daw Than Khin, in Kungyangon, Rangoon Division, British Burma in 1929. His grandparents were subordinates of the Royal House of Konbaung. His grandfather, Pabe Wun U Shwe Bin, who along with Aung San's grandfather Bo Min Yaung fought against the British annexation of Burma in 1886.

== Commemorations ==
- Aung San Thuriya Hla Thaung High School in Mingaladon is named in his honour.
