= Po Than Gyaung =

Burmese Marxist-Leninist

Yebaw Po Than Gyaung
- ဖိုးသံချောင်း

Spokesperson of the Communist Party of Burma
- Incumbent
- Assumed office 1989
- Preceded by: office created

Member of the Central Organization Committee of the Communist Party of Burma
- In office 1989–Present

Secretary of Mandalay division of the All Burma Federation of Student Union
- In office 1960–1966

Personal details
- Born: Chit Khin; July 23, 1945 (age 81) Ludu Taik, Mandalay
- Citizenship: Myanmar
- Party: Communist Party of Burma
- Other political affiliations: All Burma Federation of Student Unions (1960-1966)
- Relations: Soe Win (Older Brother); Than Yin Mar (Older Sister); Tin Win (Younger Sister); Nyein Chan (Younger Brother)
- Parents: Ludu U Hla (father); Ludu Daw Amar (mother)
- Education: Mandalay University

Yebaw Po Than Gyaung (Burmese: ရဲဘော်ဖိုးသံချောင်း; born 1945) is a Burmese revolutionary, writer, journalist and current spokesperson of the Communist Party of Burma (CPB). He is the son of Ludu U Hla and Ludu Daw Amar, and the older brother of acclaimed author Nyi Pu Lay.

== Early life ==
Po Than Gyaung was born on 23 July 1945 in Mandalay by authors and publishers Ludu U Hla and Ludu Daw Amar. He was given the birthname Chit Khin (lit. Kindness) for his peaceful mannerisms and antics in his childhood. He attended high school at St. Joseph Convent and St. Peter's High School in Mandalay.

== Political career ==
He took an interest in politics at a very young age. After he enrolled at Mandalay University in 1960, he was partaking in many student movements. he became the secretary of the Mandalay Division of the All Burma Federation of Student Unions and joint-secretary of the Student United Front of Mandalay University.

On 1966 July 4, he was detained for his involvement in the movements against the ruling military junta. In 1969, he was sent to the Coco Islands for life imprisonment as a political prisoner. There, he changed his birthname "Chit Khin" into "Po Than Gyaung" (lit. Hard as Steel) and made connections with prominent writers and revolutionaries such as Bhamo Tin Aung and Mya Than Tint. From there, he was contacted by the clandestine Communist Party of Burma (CPB) to partake in their movement for the rights of political prisoners on the Coco Islands.

Po Than Gyaung was released from life imprisonment in 1972 due to an amnesty by the ruling junta but he was kept under close supervision by the intelligence services. On 1976 August 30, he escaped the arrest from the military and reached out to the northeastern frontier of the CPB. Since then, he has become an official cadre of the party.

In the immediate aftermath of the 1989 frontier crisis of CPB, he was selected as a member of the Central Organizing Committee of the CPB, as well as the official spokesman for the party. He relocated with the rest of the cadres to Kunming and continued the struggle.

After the 2021 Myanmar coup d'état, Po Than Gyaung and other CPB cadres reentered the China–Myanmar border and rearmed their military wing. When the Three Brotherhood Alliance declared the Operation 1027 against the current military junta, they participated in the operation as an ally and helped allied forces capture Thienni and Kutkai.

Po Than Gyaung is currently serving as the official spokesperson of the CPB, partaking in newsroom interviews to give insights about the operation and the involvement of the party in the conflicts.

== In popular culture ==
A character in Mya Than Tint's popular novel "Crossing the Sea of Fire" adopted his name.

He is the subject of his mother Ludu Daw Amar's book, "Prison and Mother".

== Works ==
- သေနတ်ကို အမိန့်ပေးနိုင်ရင် အစိုးရဖြစ်တဲ့ခေတ် (If You Can Order a Gun: The Dawn of a New Government)
- အရင်းရှင်စနစ်၏ အမြင့်ဆုံးစနစ်ဖြစ်သော နယ်ချဲ့စနစ် (Imperialism, the Highest Form of Capitalism)
- ၁၀၈ စစ်ဒေသသို့ (To the 108th Frontier)
- ကျောင်းသား ထောင် တော်လှန်ရေးသမား (Student, Prison, Revolutionary)
- စစ်တပ်နှင့် နိုင်ငံရေး (Military and Politics)
