= Karen National Defence Organisation =

Insurgent group in Myanmar

- ကရင်အမျိုးသား ကာကွယ်ရေး အဖွဲ့အစည်း
- Dates active: July 16, 1947–present
- Active regions: Kayah State; Kayin State; Tanintharyi Region; Mon State; Bago Region; Myanmar-Thailand border
- Ideology: Karen nationalism Federalism; Historical: Kawthoolei separatism Anti-communism
- Part of: Karen National Union

The Karen National Defence Organisation (Burmese: ကရင်အမျိုးသား ကာကွယ်ရေး အဖွဲ့အစည်း; S'gaw Karen: ကညီဒီကလုာ်ဂၢၤသးကရၢ; KNDO) is the older of two main military branches of the Karen National Union (KNU), the other being the Karen National Liberation Army (KNLA). The KNDO fought against the government of Myanmar from 1947 until 1949 as the armed wing of the KNU. It was succeeded by the KNLA when KNDO militias were combined with KNLA forces in 1970.

The KNDO's goals include self-determination, freedom for the Karen people, the recognition of Karen State and human rights.

== History ==
=== Early Karen conflict ===
During the leadup to Burma's independence from Britain, Karen groups were unwilling to be in a Bamar-dominated country but faced internal divides over the territory of a Karen state and the extent to which they should respect Bamar demands. With this context, the KNU headquarters ordered the establishment of Karen defence militias, known as Karen National Defence Organisations, on 17 July 1947. In October 1947, the dominant political party of Burma- the Anti-Fascist People's Freedom League (AFPFL), asked the KNU to create a Karen state within Burma, but the KNU refused, demanding more territory.

Following independence, intercommunal violence grew in the Irrawaddy Delta. This violence was blamed on the KNDO by official government accounts, but such incidents were likely carried out by other Karen militias. Prime Minister U Nu and Karen leader Saw Ba U Gyi attempted to de-escalate by touring the delta. To build newfound trust, U Nu allowed the KNDO to recapture Twante near Yangon from the Communist Party of Burma. The KNDO successfully took the Twante canal back, but Bamar news organisations were badly informed about this operation, leading to many in Yangon to panic about an impending Karen insurrection.

On 1 September 1948, joint KNDO and ethnic Karen military police seized control of Thaton and Mawlamyine. This first move was poorly coordinated and would eventually spark the Karen conflict. Just four days later, the KNDO allowed central government forces to land in Mawlamyine before handing the city back. While the government had doubted the intentions of the KNU, this occupation increased their fears. Conflict increased as a series of retaliatory incidents and massacres escalated following a Bamar militia killing 200 Karens during a Christmas Eve service in a Palaw church.

Eventually, on 31 January 1949, the KNU declared war on the government and the KNDO was outlawed just four days afterwards. U Nu set up Sitwundan militias who began to demand KNDOs and ethnic Karen military police to surrender their arms before engaging in battle. The Sitwundans surrounded the KNU headquarters in Insein where local KNDOs had raided the armoury earlier. Nearby KNDOs were called in to defend the quarters with the garrison reaching over 400 members during the Battle of Insein. The KNDO successfully infiltrated Mingaladon airport four miles from Insein, but chose to only seize ammunition. The central government attacked Insein with battleships from the Hlaing River. During this time, certain portions of the countryside were under KNDO control, including Hinthada District in northern Ayeyarwady Region. The KNDOs in the delta attacked Pyu and Pathein as a distractionary attempt but ultimately failed to do anything but escalate tensions further.

The Battle of Insein eventually ended in the Burmese government's favour. As KNDO positions north of Yangon fell day by day, KNDOs quietly retreated across the Hlaing River and escaped into the countryside. In the waning days of the battle, the KNU declared the state of Kawthoolei on 20 May 1949 and reorganized the military forces under their control called the Kawthoolei Armed Forces. The KNDOs retained control of a lot of significant countryside and allowed the conflict to continue with new offensives.

=== Post-Insein ===
Despite the formation of the Kawthoolei Armed Forces, KNDO-controlled towns and villages remained important to the Karen cause. In 1952, as the conflict dragged on longer than KNU leadership expected, new KNDO militias were established in Karen-controlled townships with the support of the local populace- both Karen and Bamar.

In the 1960s, the Karen leadership changed its approach to the war, withdrawing more from the Irrawaddy delta. The Karen National Liberation Army (KNLA) was founded during this time and was reorganized in 1970 into 7 brigades. These brigades combined KNLA soldiers with local township KNDO militias within each brigade territory, quickly growing the KNLA into a 10,000-strong army.

From the 1970s onward, the KNLA brigades maintained a presence in Karen-controlled villages administrating according to rules set by the KNU through local KNDO militiamen. These KNDOs were usually farmers, young boys or retired soldiers.

The KNDO closely followed the peace process instigated by the government in 2011, starting with the call for a nationwide ceasefire by the Ethnic Armed Organisations (EAOs). On 11 October 2015, the KNDO released a statement on the recently signed Nationwide Ceasefire Agreement.
