= Nandar (activist) =

Burmese podcaster, human rights activist and feminist activist

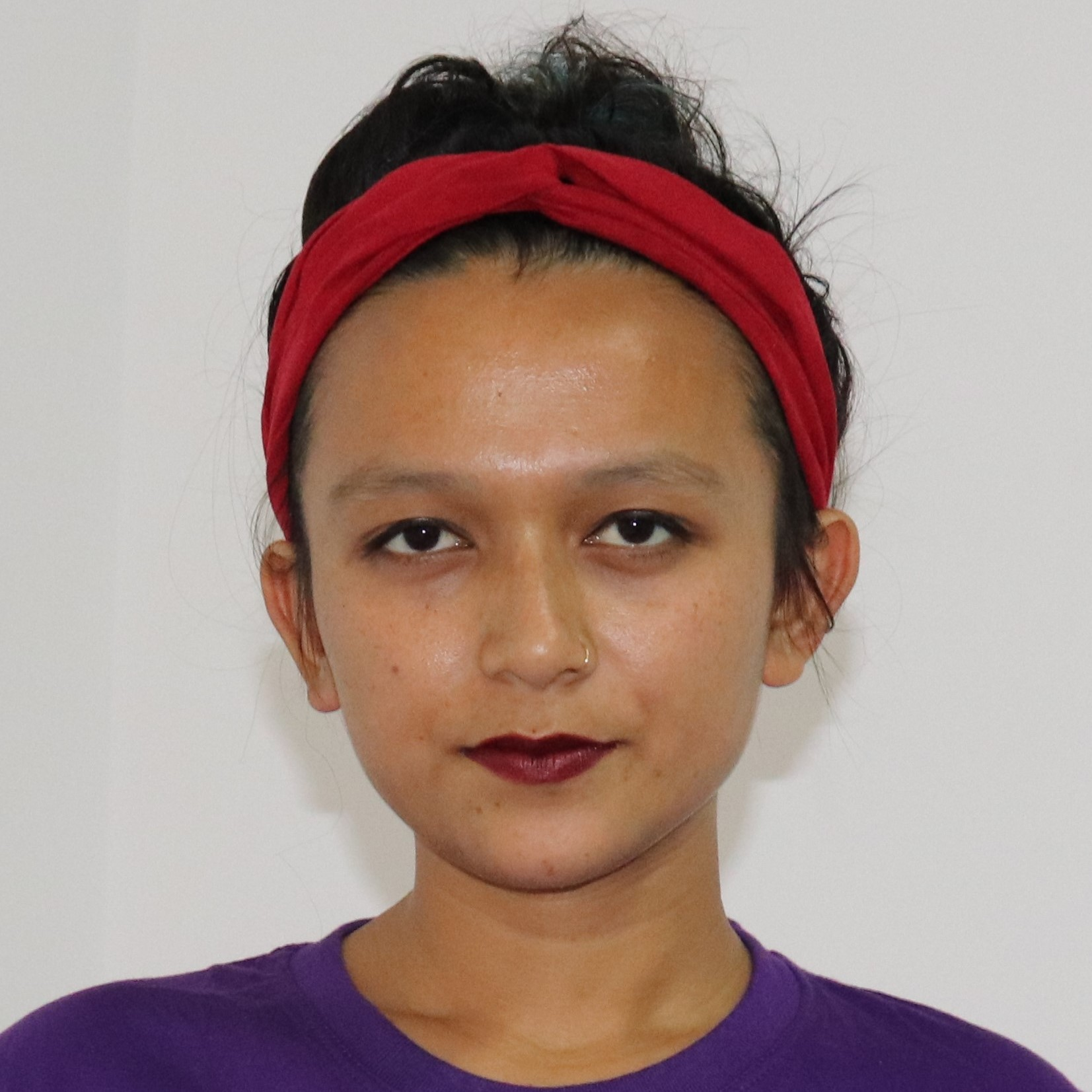
- Nandar in 2019.
- Born: Nandu Gyawali; 1995 (age 29–30); Mansam, Shan State, Myanmar
- Occupation(s): Feminist activist and podcaster
- Notable work: Translations of We Should All Be Feminists, The Vagina Monologues
- Honours: 100 Women (BBC)

Nandu Gyawali (born 1995), known as Nandar, is a feminist activist in Myanmar. She is the founder of the Purple Feminists Group and hosts the podcasts G-Taw Zagar Wyne (in Burmese) and Feminist Talks (in English). In 2020, she was named to the BBC's 100 Women list.

== Early life ==
Nandar was born in 1995 in Mansam, a town in the area of Namtu Township, in Myanmar's Shan State. Her father died of an epileptic seizure when she was a teenager. Her mother, who was present during the seizure, refused to help him because she was menstruating, and cultural tradition led her to believe touching him would aggravate his symptoms. This marked Nandar's adolescence and led her to become an educator and activist on issues of sex and gender.

She refused to marry and stay in her hometown, instead pursuing an education in Yangon, as well as through scholarship programs in Thailand and Bangladesh.

== Activism ==
Nandar became directly engaged in feminist activism in 2017, translating Chimamanda Ngozi Adichie's essay We Should All Be Feminists into Burmese. She went on to translate Adichie's epistolary manifesto Dear Ijeawele, or A Feminist Manifesto in Fifteen Suggestions.

In 2018, Nandar translated, produced, and performed in the first production of Eve Ensler's The Vagina Monologues in Myanmar. Productions were staged the following two years as well.

After working for the Rainfall Feminist Organization in Yangon, Nandar founded the activist organization Purple Feminists Group, which promotes sexual and reproductive health among young people across Myanmar, spreads awareness of human rights, advocates against gender violence, and fights the taboos of Myanmar society. One of the organization's major campaigns centered on removing the stigma against menstruation in Myanmar.

In August 2019, through the Purple Feminists Group, Nandar launched the podcast G-Taw Zagar Wyne, which aims to give a voice to the women of Myanmar. The podcast, whose name means something like "nosy woman," a Burmese insult usually directed at older women who are busybodies, deals with such topics as menstruation, abortion, and consent. It features conversations with both experts and anonymous women telling their own stories. In July 2020, she launched a second podcast, the English-language Feminist Talks, with the goal of reaching a wider audience. Although podcasting is not particularly popular in Myanmar, Nandar's goal is to reach people who may have had their education cut short and cannot read. Some episodes have prompted critics to threaten her with violence.

After the 2021 Myanmar coup d'état, Nandar also became involved in the anti-coup protests, saying: "I would compare the dictatorship to the patriarchy, and democracy to feminism."

In 2020, she was named to the BBC's 100 Women list of influential female figures.
