= Twante Township =

Twante Township တွံတေး မြို့နယ် Twantay Township
- township
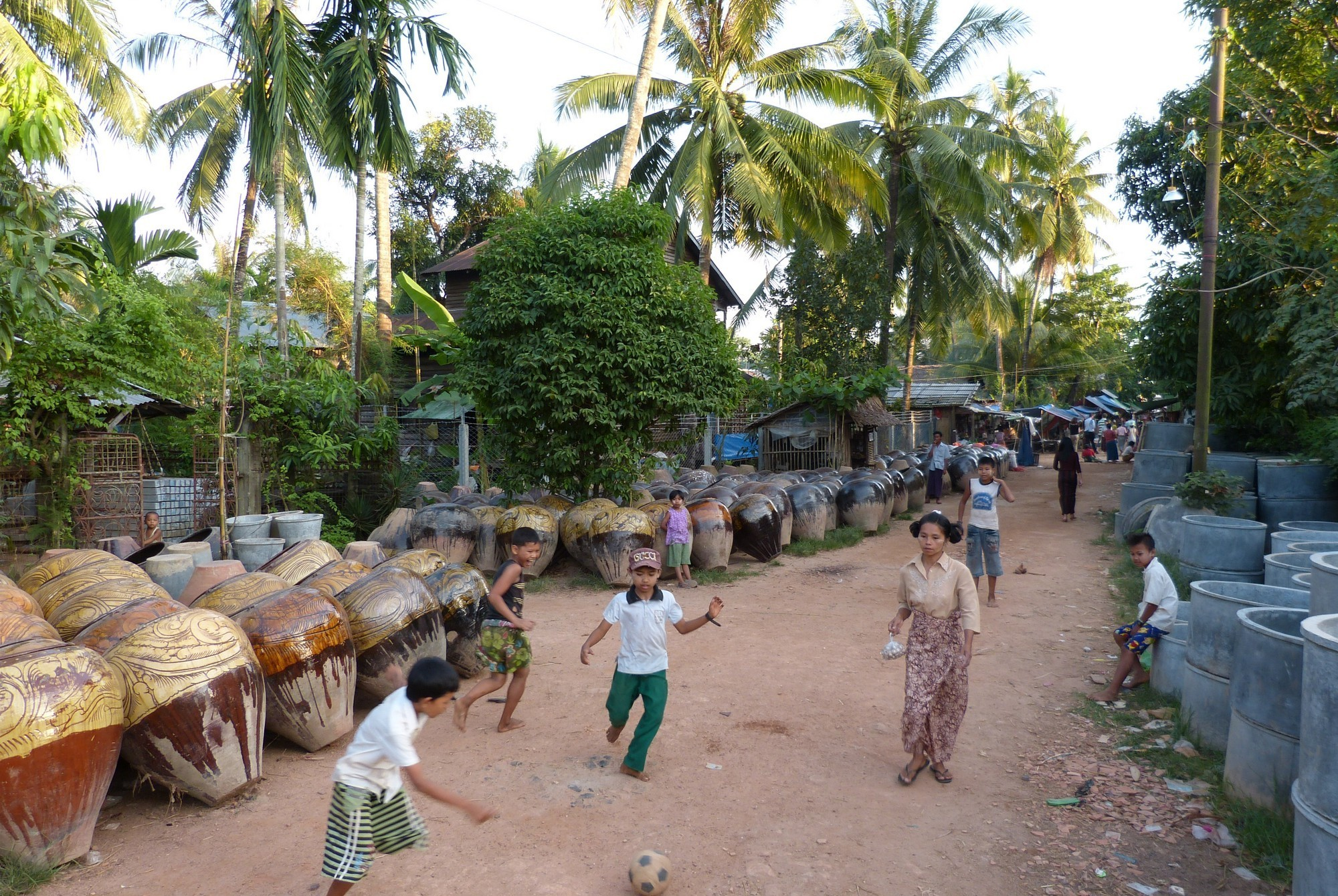

- Location in Burma
- Coordinates: 16°44′0″N 95°58′0″E
- Country: Myanmar
- Region: Yangon Region
- Administrative seat: Twante

Population (2014)
  - Total: 226,836
- Time zone: UTC6:30 (MST)

Twante Township also Twantay Township (Burmese: တွံတေး မြို့နယ်, pronounced [tʊ̀ɰ̃té mjo̰nɛ̀]) is a township in the Yangon Region of Burma (Myanmar). It is located west across the Hlaing River from the city of Yangon. The principal town and administrative seat is Twante. The township is home to the Shwesandaw Pagoda (known as "Golden Hair Relic Pagoda" in English) and it is believed to contain strands of hair from the head of Gautama, and its annual pagoda festival is held on Burmese New Year. Built by the British in 1881, the Twante canal is the longest man-made canal in Myanmar, providing a shortcut waterway between Irawaddy River and Yangon river. This divides Twante Township across its which divides Twante Township with its length of 35 km and there is one bridge that spans the canal is called Twante bridge. Baungdawgyoke Monastery in Twante Township is famous as there are pagodas including the replica of Mahabodhi Temple.

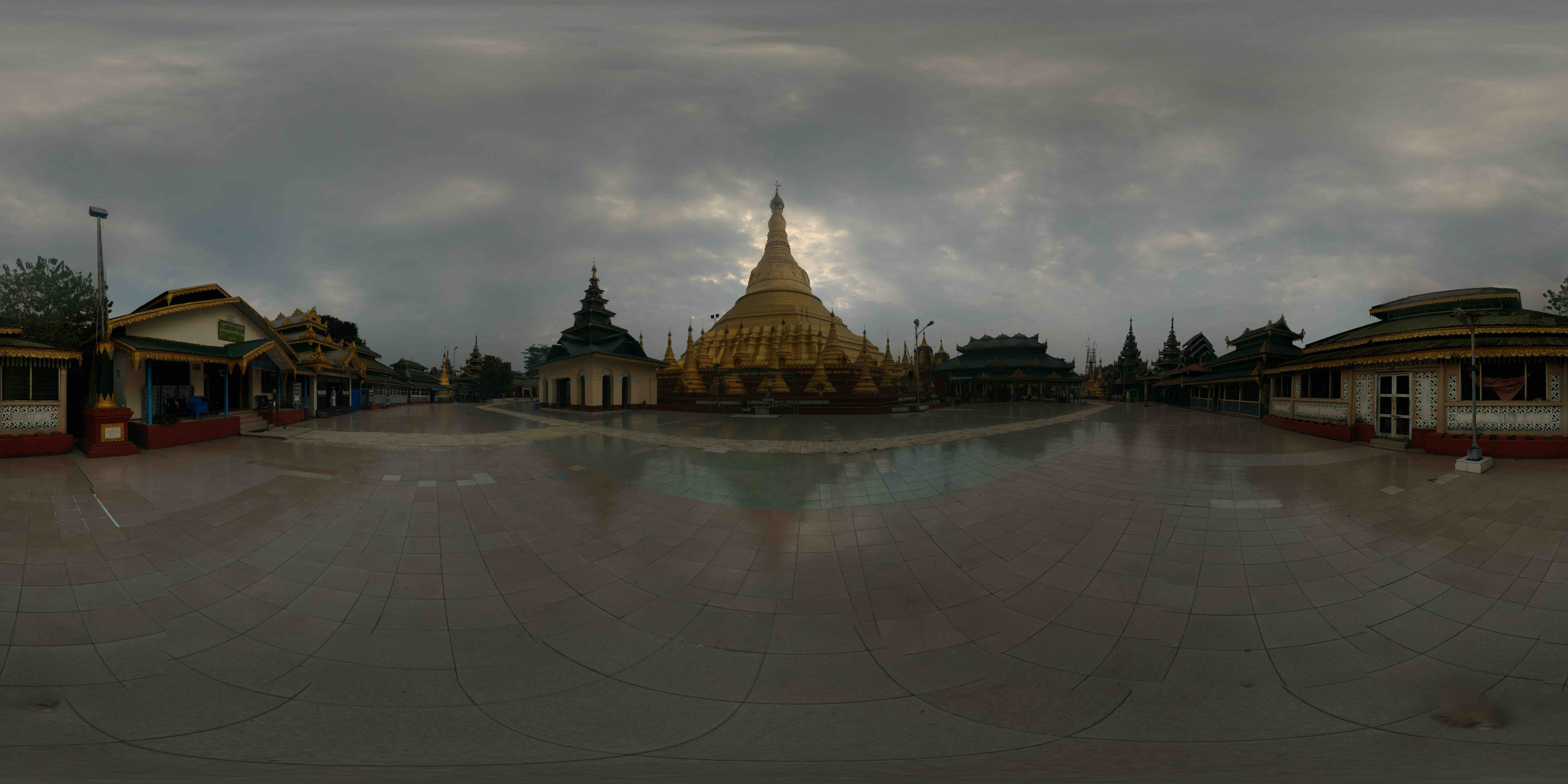
Panoramic View of Twante Shwe San Daw Pagoda.

== History ==
During the British rule in Burma, George Orwell was a police officer in Twante, responsible for the security of some 200,000 people.

=== Communities ===
The 220 villages of Twante Township are organized into 65 village tracts and 8 urban wards. Twante Township is well known for its pottery activities handled by a few families since several generations. It is also area of fish farming in Yangon region.

=== Transport ===
A water bus on the river connects with Yangon.
