= Shwesandaw Pagoda (Twante) =

Buddhist Pagoda in Twante, Myanmar

- ရွှေဆံတော်ဘုရား
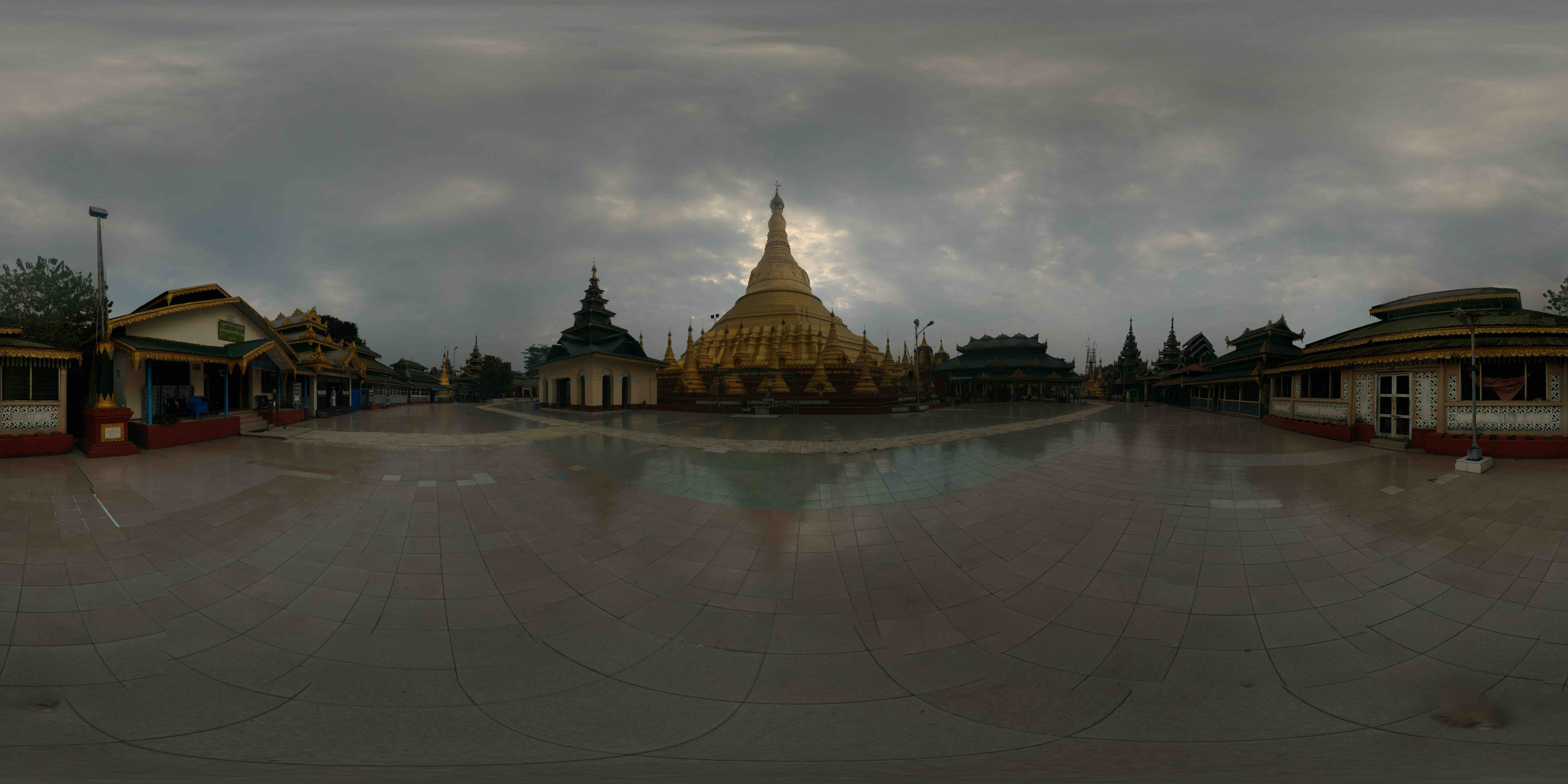
- Shwesandaw Pagoda is major Pilgrimage site in Twante.

- Location within Myanmar

Religion
- Affiliation: Buddhist
- Region: Yangon

Location
- Location: Twante, Yangon, Burma
- Country: Myanmar
- Coordinates: 16°42′10″N 95°56′04″E

The Shwesandaw Pagoda, or Shwesandaw Paya, (Burmese: ရွှေဆံတော်ဘုရား; Burmese pronunciation: [ʃwè sʰàɴdɔ̀ pʰəjá]) is a Buddhist Stupa in Twante Township, south of Yangon region, Myanmar. It is a popular tourist destination and a pilgrimage site for Buddhists as it is said to contain a couple of the Buddha's hairs. Its name means Golden Hair Relic.

== See also ==
- Shwesandaw Pagoda (Bagan)
- Shwesandaw Pagoda (Pyay)
