= Suk Bahadur Rai =

Burmese Gurkha

Suk Bahadur Rai ဆွတ်(ခ်)ဗဟာဒူးရိုင်း
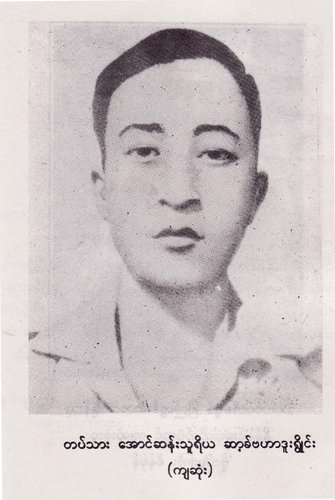
- Died: 1950
- Allegiance: Union of Burma
- Rank: Private
- Awards: Aung San Thuriya

Private Aung San Thuriya Suk Bahadur Rai (Nepali: सुक बहादुर राई, Burmese: ဆွတ်(ခ်)ဗဟာဒူးရိုင်း) (serial No.(kyee) 01914) was the only Gurkha (ဂေါ်ရခါး in Burmese) to have received Aung San Thuriya medal, the highest and most prestigious award in Myanmar (Burma) for gallantry and bravery in the face of enemy.

He was killed in action while fighting against invading Kuomintang (KMT) troops of General Li Mi of China in the Battle of Tachileik Highway in Shan State, Myanmar in 1950. Throughout the action, he displayed conspicuous gallantry and responsible for killing several enemy combatants.

Suk Bahdur Rai was honoured and awarded Aung San Thuriya medal posthumously by President Mahn Win Maung.

== Commemorations ==
- Aung San Thuriya Suk Bahadur Rai Street in downtown Yangon is named in his honour.
