= Naing Ngant Gonyi =

Naing Ngant Gonyi (Burmese: နိုင်ငံ့ဂုဏ်ရည်ဆု; lit. 'honour of state') is a Burmese national honorary title of recognition for politicians and superannuated social reformers for their services to the country and for their outstanding efforts in Myanmar's history with true dedication and selfless sacrifice for the benefit of the nation. There are two classes: first class and second class. The recipients of the first class received outright grants of 30,000 kyat. The recipients of the second class received grants of 15,000 kyat. The State Council of the Socialist Republic of Burma began conferring the title of Naingngan Gonyi on June 7, 1980, with the issuance of Decree No. (51/80) by President Ne Win. The title was awarded between 1980 and 1988.

== Recipients ==
- Over 600 recipients from 1980 to 1988
