= Orders, decorations, and medals of Myanmar =

This article describes the religious, military and civil orders, decorations and medals of the Union of Myanmar.

== Religious honorary orders ==
Before and after Myanmar's independence, governments presented two religious orders, Abhidhaja Mahā Rattha Guru and Agga Maha Pandita, to distinguished Theravada Buddhist monks. In 1953, the government set up a committee of venerable monks and a committee of individuals to award. The group set four qualifications for the Abhidhaja Maha Rattha Guru order and five qualifications for Agga Maha Pandita order.

On 24 October 1991, the State Law and Order Restoration Council issued provision No. (42/91) and extended 20 religious orders. And provision No. (37/2010) enacted to confer the title of Tipitakadhara Dhammabhandagarika.

The above 23 degrees divided into seven categories were announced and presented annually on Independence Day. Although the original qualifications for religious orders were excellent, some of the qualifications for distinguished venerable monks and outstanding individuals were needed to be updated with the times. Due to such circumstances, the qualifications of each relevant religious order have been revised and amended by order No. (45/2015) dated 17 June 2015.

== Modern-day military and civil honorary orders ==
The State Peace and Development Council has enacted the provision No. 48/2009 dated 17 December 2009 to award honorary orders and medals to individuals who have made outstanding contributions to build nation. The following are the individuals who are eligible for honorary orders and medals:

1. People who are working hard to build nation;
2. Leaders, diplomats and individuals from foreign countries who are striving for friendly cooperation with the State;
3. Peoples who have sacrificed their lives to protect national responsibilities and policy;
4. Individuals who make significant efforts in line with community peace and rule of law, political, economic and social development for nation;
5. People who can be world class creatives in the science, arts and other fields;
6. Persons with excellent knowledge in literature and fine arts;

=== Types of honorary orders and medals ===
There are three types of honorary orders and medals in the Union of Myanmar.

- Thingaha Orders, there are two groups; Thiri Thudhamma Thingaha and PyidaungSu Sithu Thingaha
- Medals, they are divided into Military Gallantry Medals and Outstanding Performance Medals
- Badges, they are divided into Military Gallantry Badges and Outstanding Performance Badges

==== Thingaha orders ====
There are two groups for awarding individuals who have done great work for the country.

===== 1. Thiri Thudhamma Thingaha =====
- Agga Maha Thiri Thudhamma
- Sadoe Maha Thiri Thudhamma
- Mahar Thiri Thudhamma

===== 2. Pyidaungsu Sithu Thingaha =====
- Agga Maha Thray Sithu
- Sadoe Maha Thray Sithu
- Maha Thray Sithu
- Thray Sithu
- Sithu

==== Medals ====
Military Distinguished Gallantry Medals are as follows:

- AungSan Thuriya Medal
- Thiha Thura Medal
- Thura Medal

Outstanding Performance Medals are as follows:

- Thiri Pyanchi Medal
- Zayya Kyawhtin Medal
- Wunna Kyawhtin Medal
- Alinkar Kyawswa Medal
- Theikpa Kyawswa Medal

==== Badges ====
===== 1. Military Gallantry and Outstanding Performance Badges =====
====== 1.1 Military Gallantry Badges ======
- AungSan Badge
- ThihaBala Badge
- Hero Record Badge

====== 1.2. Military Outstanding Performance Badges ======
- Myanmar Military Service ThinGaHa Badge
- Outstanding Military Service Badge
- Pyithu TharKaung Badge
- State Military Service Badge
- Thwarting Foreign Enemy Badge
- People's Militia Combat Badge

===== 2. Myanmar Police Force Gallantry and Outstanding Performance Badges =====
====== 2.1 Myanmar Police Force Gallantry Badges ======
- Ye Thiha Bagde
- Ye Thura Bagde
- Ye Bala Badge

====== 2.2. Myanmar Police Force Outstanding Performance Badges ======
- Ye Thurein Badge
- Ye Kyawswa Badge
- Ye Kyawthu Badge
- Outstanding Police Service Badge
- State Police Service Badge
- Myanmar Police Force Joint Combat Badge

===== 3. Public Service Outstanding Performance Badges =====
- Outstanding Public Service Badge
- Public Service Badge
- Rule of Law and Order Badge
- Peace and Development Badge

On December 10, 2012, provision amendment added new categories of medals in the Medals for Outstanding Performance. They were:

- Excellent Performance in Arts (First, Second and Third Classes)
- Excellent Performance in Science (First, Second and Third Classes)
- Excellent Performance in Medical Field (First, Second and Third Classes)
- Excellent Performance in Technology (First, Second and Third Classes)

On December 5, 2014, the President of Union of Republic of Myanmar issued the order No.74/2014 to create and add new categories of the Medals for Outstanding Performance in Administrative, Social, Economy and Subjects fields. They were:

- Excellent Performance in Administrative Field (First, Second and Third Classes)
- Excellent Performance in Social Field (First, Second and Third Classes)
- Excellent Performance in Agricultural Economy Field (First, Second and Third Classes)
- Excellent Performance in Industrial Economy Field (First, Second and Third Classes)
- Excellent Performance in Commerce Economy Field (First, Second and Third Classes)
- Excellent Performance in Service Economy Field (First, Second and Third Classes)
- Excellent Performance in Science (First, Second and Third Classes)
- Excellent Performance in Arts (First, Second and Third Classes)
- Excellent Performance in Medical Field (First, Second and Third Classes)
- Excellent Performance in Technology (First, Second and Third Classes)
- Excellent Performance in Fine Arts (First, Second and Third Classes)
- Excellent Performance in Literary (First, Second and Third Classes)

=== Detail and description of medals ===
==== Independence Mawgunwin Award ====
Star of the Independence Mawgunwin Award

This award (Burmese: လွတ်လပ်ရေး မော်ကွန်းဝင်, Lutt Latt Yayy Mawgunwin) was for participation in both military and civil struggles of Burma's independence. This award is granted for service in three different periods:

1. 8 January to 26 July 1942
2. 27 July 1942 to 26 March 1945
3. 27 March to 15 August 1945

Participants in all three periods were awarded the first class, participants in only two periods received the second class and participants in only in one period were awarded the third class. The provision of this award can be passed down to direct heirs of the original participant and to be worn, multi-generationally, in this fashion similar to the awards bestowed by ancient Myanmar kings to their loyal subjects. Established in 1953, the last Independence Mawgunwin Award was given on 24 November 1986.

==== Aung San Thuriya Medal ====
Instituted in 1948, the Aung San Thuriya (အောင်ဆန်းသူရိယဘွဲ့) medal is the highest recognition for valour and gallantry "in the face of the enemy" that can be awarded to members of the Myanmar Armed Forces of any ranks in any services. This is the highest military award in Myanmar and it is equivalent to British Victoria Cross and German Knight Cross of the Iron Cross.

The decoration is a one and half inch (3.8 cm) stainless steel stylized sun of sixteen rays. Suspended by an integral straight bar suspender. The name of the recipient name and year of award is engraved on the reverse and the sun was held by two ribbons.

To this day, there have only been six Aung San Thuriya medals has been awarded and only one of the recipients is civilian. The recipients are:

Name	Rank	Serial No.	Ethnicity	Unit	Awarding Order No.	Date	Battlefield	Enemy Forces
Aye Cho	Major	BC 5180	Burman	No. 21 Union Military Police Battalion	N/A	1948	Battle of Po Tha Aung Gon	Communist Party of Burma (CPB)
Taik Chun	Lieutenant	BC 7288	Chin	No. 1 Chin Rifles Battalion	N/A	18/04/1949	Battle of Insein	Karen National Defence Organisation (KNDO)
Hla Thaung	Private	88865	Burman	No. 3 Burma Rifles Battalion	10/A Htoo/50	29/04/1949	Battle of Daik-U	Karen National Defence Organisation (KNDO)
Suk Bahadur Rai	Private	01914	Gurkha	No. 4 Burma Rifles Battalion	14/A Htoo/51	05/1950	Battle of Tachileik Highway	Kuomintang (KMT)
Saw Myint	Private	60603	Karen	No. 1 Karen Rifles Battalion	3/A Htoo/52	28/06/1951	Battle of Yethogyi Road	Karen National Defence Organisation (KNDO)
Saw Ba Yi	Civilian	–	Karen	–	3/A Htoo/52	28/06/1951	Battle of Yethogyi Road	Karen National Defence Organisation (KNDO)

==== Thiha Thura Medal ====
The decoration is a bronze stylized Burmese lion, with the name of the decoration written in Burmese "Thiha Thura" (သီဟသူရ) on the scroll below. The ribbon is 1.25 inches (32 mm), bright red with yellow edges or red with dark green centre stripes.

A total of 47 Thiha Thura Medals has been awarded between 1949 and 2018 January.

==== Thura Medal ====
A gold depiction of a stylized rising sun with the central sun in red enamel. The ribbon is 32 mm, bright red with yellow edges and a yellow center stripe.

To date, a total of 547 Thura medals has been awarded. The only woman to be awarded the medal is Ma Chit Po.

=== History ===
In the Parliamentary Democracy Period after regaining independence in 1948, the honorary titles and honorary medals in conformity with the independent and sovereign country were created to confer them on the outstanding persons. From 1948 to 1978, the honorary titles and honorary medals conferred on the outstanding persons were as follows:

1. Independence Mawgunwin Title (First, Second and Third Classes)
2. Thingaha Honorary Title
  1. Thudhamma Thingaha (Most Glorious Order of Truth)
    1. Agga Maha Thirithudhamma Title
    2. Thadoe Thirithudhamma Title
    3. Maha Thirithudhamma Title
  2. Pyidaungsu Sithu Thingaha (Order of the Union of Burma)
    1. Agga Maha Tharaysithu Title
    2. Thadoe Maha Tharaysithu Title
    3. Maha Tharaysithu Title
    4. Tharaysithu Title
    5. Sithu Title
3. Honorary Title for Gallantry (It had not been awarded)
4. Honorary Titles for Outstanding Performance
  1. Thiri Pyanchi Title
  2. Wunna Kyawhtin Title
  3. Alinka Kyawswa Title
  4. Theikpa Kyawswa Title
  5. Zeya Kyawhtin Title
5. Medals for Gallantry
  1. Aung San Thuriya
  2. Thiha Thura
  3. Thura
  4. Aung San Medal
  5. Thiha Bala Medal
  6. Gallantry Medal
  7. Pyidaungsu Gold Medal
  8. Pyidaungsu Silver Medal
  9. Good Military Service Medal
  10. State Good Military Service Medal
  11. Good Police Service Medal (first and second classes)
6. Medals for Outstanding Performances (It had not been awarded)

In 1978, the Burma Socialist Programme Party issued new provisions on honorary titles and honorary medals in conformity with the Socialist System to amend the honorary titles and honorary medals awarded in the Parliamentary Democracy Period. According to new provision, the titles and medals were conferred on those who forged the Socialism, on those who made the utmost efforts for the improvement of the socialist economic system, and on those who made the ultimate sacrifice in safeguarding the nation. The honorary titles and medals awarded from 1978 to 1988 were as follows:

1. Independence Mawgunwin Medal (First, Second and Third Classes)
1. Honorary Title
  1. Tagun Group
    1. Aung San Tagun Title
    2. Pyidaungsu Tagun Title
    3. Tagun Title
  2. Zarni Group
    1. Lanzin Zarni Title
    2. Pyidaungsu Zarni Title
    3. Zarni Title
  3. Naingngan Gonyi Title (First and Second Classes) (no permission to use it as prefix or suffix to the name of the winner)
2. Honorary Titles for Gallantry
  1. Aung San Thuriya Title
  2. Thiha Thura Title
  3. Thura Title
3. Honorary Titles for Outstanding Performance (It had not been awarded)
4. Medals for Gallantry
  1. Aung San Medal
  2. Thiha Bala Medal
  3. Gallantry Medal
  4. Ye Thiha Medal
  5. Ye Thura Medal
  6. Ye Bala Medal
5. Medals for Outstanding Performance
  1. All-round Excellent Performance in Socialist Economy
  2. Excellent Performance in Agricultural Field (First, Second and Third Classes)
  3. Excellent Performance in Industrial Field (First, Second and Third Classes)
  4. All-round Excellent Performance in Socialist Democracy
  5. Excellent Performance in Administrative Field (First, Second and Third Classes)
  6. Excellent Performance in Social Field (First, Second and Third Classes)
  7. Ayaydawpon Medal
  8. Independence Organizing Medal
  9. Medal of Freedom
  10. Good Military Service Medal
  11. Good Public Medal
  12. Medal for those who made sacrifices
  13. State Military Service Medal
  14. Medal for Combating Foreign Enemy
  15. People's Militia Combat Medal
  16. Ye Thurein Medal
  17. Ye Kyawswa Medal
  18. Ye Kyawthu Medal
  19. Good Police Service Medal
  20. State Police Service Medal
  21. Police Joint Combat Medal
  22. Public Good Service Medal
  23. Public Service Medal
  24. Rule of Law and Order Medal

The honorary titles and medals awarded from 1988 to 2009 were the same as those awarded from 1978 to 1988. There were no changes in honorary titles and medals, and most were awarded in accordance with the system practiced during the period of Burma Socialist Programme Party.
