= Yangon River =

Coordinates: 16°28′N 96°20′E

Yangon River Hlaing River
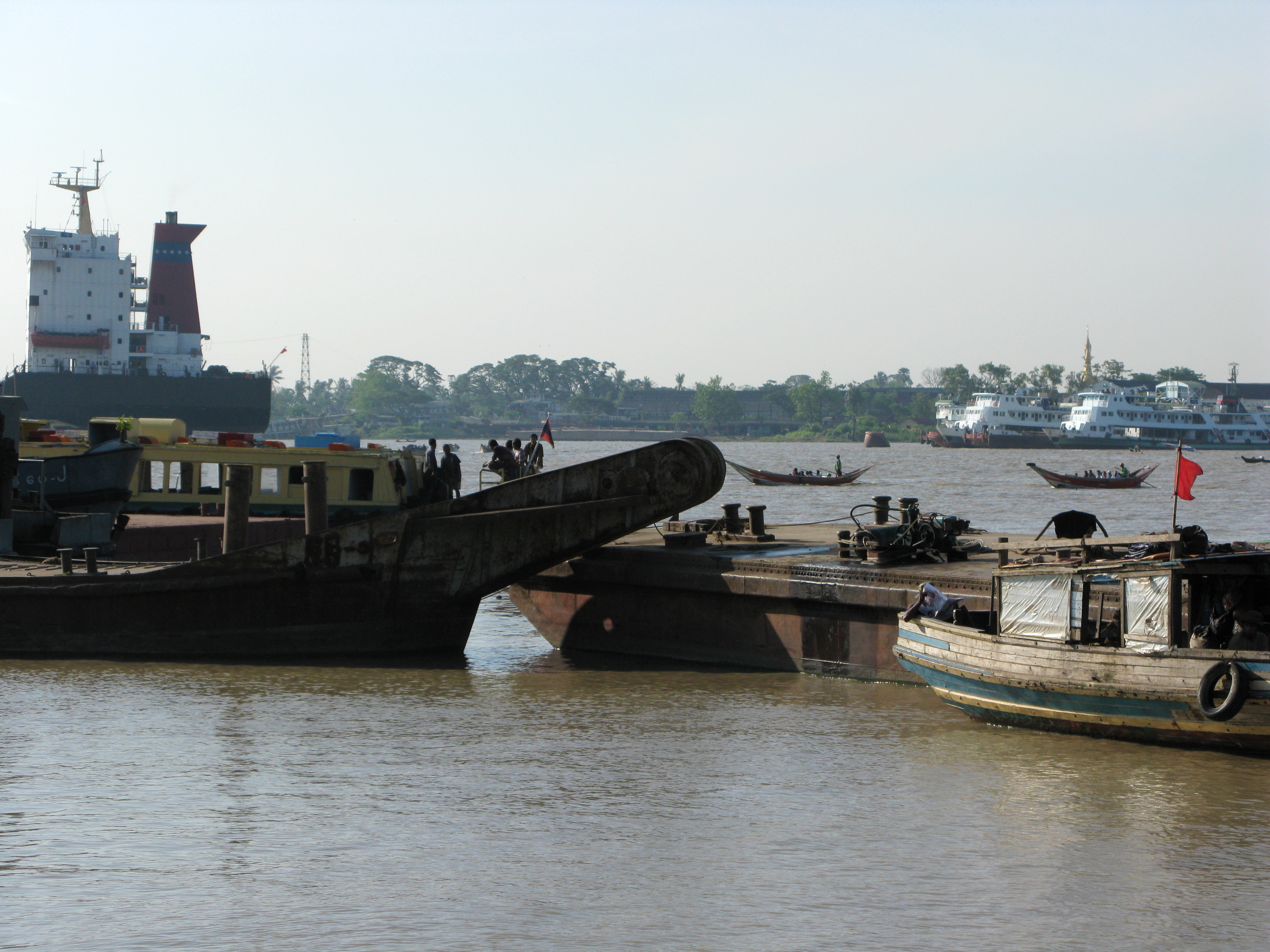
- Yangon River
- Native name: လှိုင်မြစ် (Burmese)

Location
- Country: Myanmar
- City: Yangon (also known as Rangoon)

Physical characteristics
- Mouth
  - location: Andaman Sea
  - elevation: 0 m (0 ft)
- Discharge
  - location: Gulf of Martaban

The Yangon River (also known as the Rangoon River or Hlaing River) is formed by the confluence of the Pegu and Myitmaka Rivers in Myanmar. It is a marine estuary that runs from Yangon (also known as Rangoon) to the Gulf of Martaban of the Andaman Sea. The channel is navigable by ocean-travelling vessels, thus plays a critical role in the economy of Myanmar.

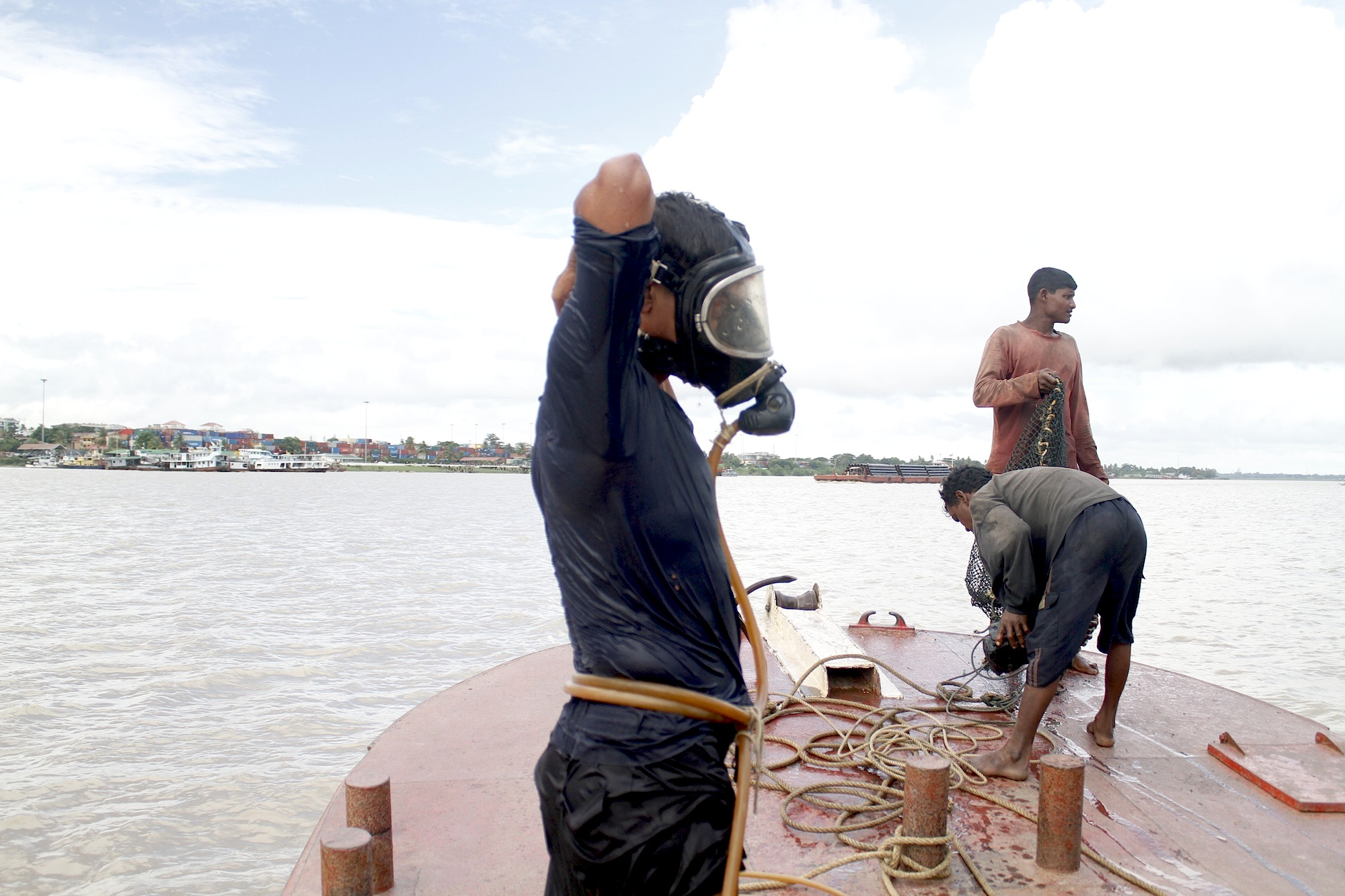
Coal divers prepare to dive in the Yangon River

The Twante Canal connects the Yangon River with the Irrawaddy Delta, once known as 'the rice bowl of Asia'. It consists of around 1,000 square miles (3,000 km^{2}) of lush teak plantations and mangrove swamps, many of which have now been cleared for rice production.
