= Saw Ba U Gyi =

Burmese politician (1905–1950)

- စောဘဦးကြီး; စီၤဘးအူကၠံ
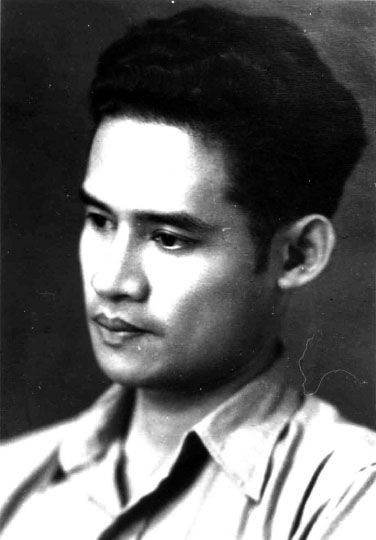

1st President of the Karen National Union (Kawthoolei)
- In office 1945–1950
- Premier: Ba Maw

Minister for Transport and Communications of Burma
- In office February 1947 – April 1947

Minister of Revenue of British Burma
- In office 1937–1939

Personal details
- Born: 1905 Bassein, British Burma
- Died: 12 August 1950 (aged 44–45) near Kawkareik, Burma
- Education: Cambridge University
- Occupation: Politician, lawyer

Saw Ba U Gyi (S'gaw Karen: စီၤဘးအူကၠံ, Burmese: စောဘဦးကြီး [sɔ́ ba̰ ʔú dʑí]; 1905 – 12 August 1950) was the first President of the Karen National Union. Ba U Gyi graduated with a bachelor's degree from Cambridge University in 1925 and studied law in England, passing the English bar in 1927. From 1937 to 1939, he served as the Minister of Revenue of British Burma, and from February to April 1947, as the Minister for Transport and Communications of Burma. He was killed in an ambush by the Burmese Army on 12 August 1950.

== Early life ==
Saw Ba U Gyi was born in 1905 to a wealthy land-owning Karen family in Burma. After he completed his degree at Rangoon University in 1925, he went to London, studied at Cambridge University and became a lawyer. He passed the English bar in 1927. In 1937 he returned to Burma and joined the government of Ba Maw as Minister of Revenue.

== Adulthood ==
Later, he joined the pre-independence cabinet and became Information Minister of Burma. During this time, he began to work to gain independence for the Karen people. In September 1945, he was one of the leaders of the Karen Central Organization. He and the KCO asked the British that they be granted their own homeland. On 25 August 1946, he and other Karen leaders arrived in London to get Karen their homeland. At this time, the British controlled Karen land and he went to Great Britain in an effort to regain control of the land for his people, but the British refused and did not give it back to them. Instead the British gave it to Burma. On 27 January 1947, the British agreed with Aung San-Attlee, the Burmese president, and gave him and the Anti-Fascist People's Freedom League (AFPFL) rule over Burma. Saw Ba U Gyi had joined the AFPFL in 1944 which was struggling for Burmese independence. He disagreed with the AFPFL political line and resigned to lead the Karen National Union.

== Independence ==
According to Paul Keenan of the Karen History and Culture Preservation Society, "The Aung San-Attlee agreement gave no provisions for Karen aspirations for their own land." To form their case, between 5 and 7 February 1947, 700 members of the Karen Norberg Associates (KNA), Baptist KNA, Buddhist Karen National Association (BKNA), Karen Central Organization (KCO), and its youth branch the Karen Youth Organization (KYO) which had been formed in October 1945, met at Vinton Memorial Hall in Rangoon and formed the Karen National Union. That union asked for representation in government. They also asked for a seaboard on their own land, and for the creation of all-Karen units in the armed forces. The British ignored the KNU.

== Rebellion and Death ==
After the negotiations with the AFPFL government failed, Saw Ba U Gyi led an armed rebellion as commander of the Karen National Liberation Army (KNDO) in 1949. He was ambushed and killed on 12 August 1950 at a small village near Hlaingbwe township, around 180 miles (290 km) from Rangoon, with other Karen leaders and an English major who was imprisoned for supplying arms. His corpse was reportedly transported four miles out to sea where it was thrown overboard.

== Karen Martyrs' Day ==
The anniversary of Saw Ba U Gyi's death is commemorated annually on 12 August as Karen Martyrs' Day.

Ba U Gyi's four principles are still held as the guiding Principles of the Revolution of the Karen National Union:

1. Surrender is out of the question
2. The recognition of the Karen State must be completed.
3. We shall retain our arms.
4. We shall decide our own political destiny.
