= Myanmar–Thailand border =

International border

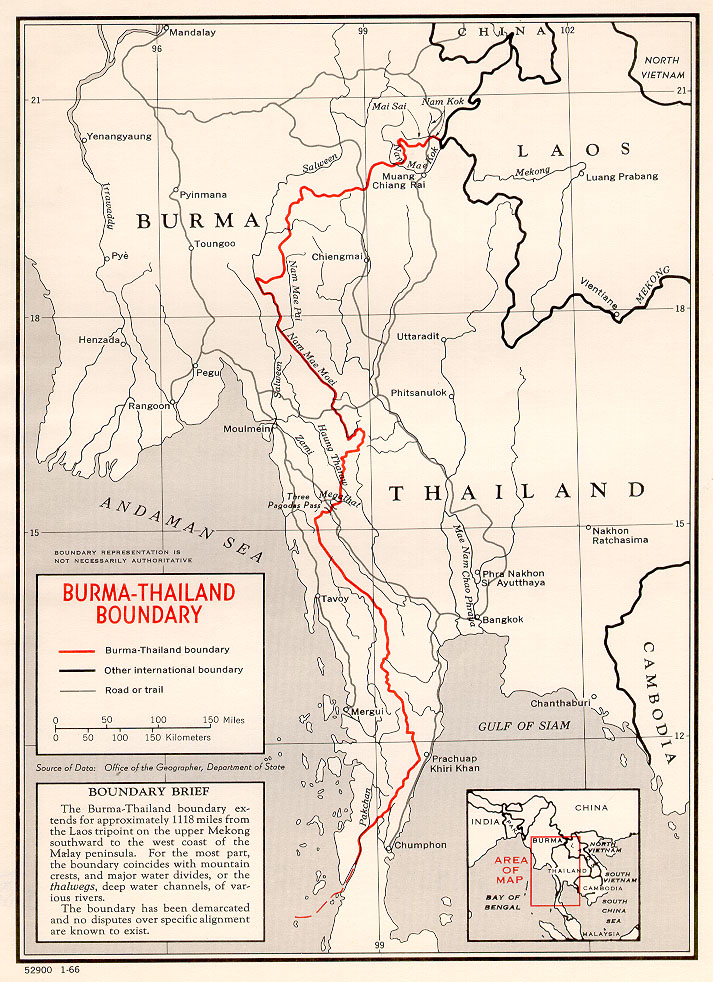
- Map of the Myanmar–Thailand border

Characteristics
- Entities: Myanmar Thailand
- Length: 1,501 mi (1,304 nmi; 2,416 km)

History
- Established: 1896; 130 years ago Myanmar–Laos border
- Current shape: 1948; 78 years ago Gained full independence and became an international frontier between two sovereign states

The Myanmar–Thailand border is the international border between the territory of Myanmar (formerly Burma) and Thailand. The border is 1,501 mi (1,304 nmi; 2,416 km) in length and runs from the tripoint with Laos in the north to the Andaman Sea coast in the south.

== Description ==
The border starts in the north at the tripoint with Laos at the confluence of the Kok and Mekong rivers and, after briefly following the Kok and then the Sai, then proceeds overland to the west via a series of irregular lines through the Daen Lao Range, before turning to the south-west and joining the Salween River. The border follows the Salween and then Moei River southwards, before leaving it and proceeding southwards overland through the Dawna Range and Bilauktaung Range (collectively these mountains form the Tenasserim Hills). The border continues southwards down the Malay Peninsula, almost cutting Thailand in two at Prachuap Khiri Khan, before reaching the Isthmus of Kra and the Kraburi River, which it then follows out via a wide estuary to the Andaman Sea. The maritime boundary then follows coordinates marked by the countries' continental shelf delimitation agreement towards the tripoint with India, which controls the Andaman and Nicobar Islands.

== History ==
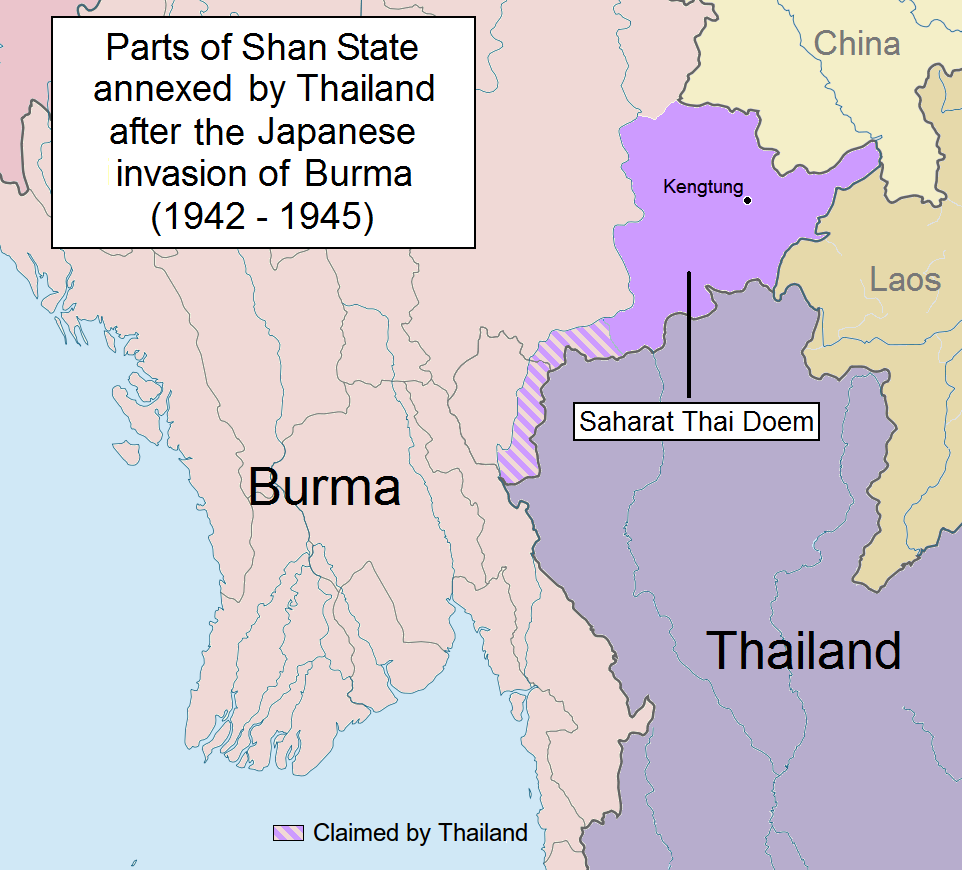
Map of the areas briefly annexed to Thailand during the Second World War

The border regions have historically been contested between the various Thai and Burmese states. Fighting between Burma and the Siamese Ayutthaya Kingdom over control of what is now Myanmar's Tanintharyi Region dominated the area in the 16th century, before Burma destroyed Ayutthaya and took control of the region in 1767. Soon after, Siam extended suzerainty over the Lanna Kingdom (now Northern Thailand), which had previously been under Burmese control. Burmese expansion in the 19th century brought it into conflict with the British in India, sparking a series of conflicts which ended with Burma being occupied and incorporated into British India. With France occupying French Indochina in the same period, the two European states allowed the Kingdom of Siam (the old name for Thailand) to retain its independence as a buffer state.

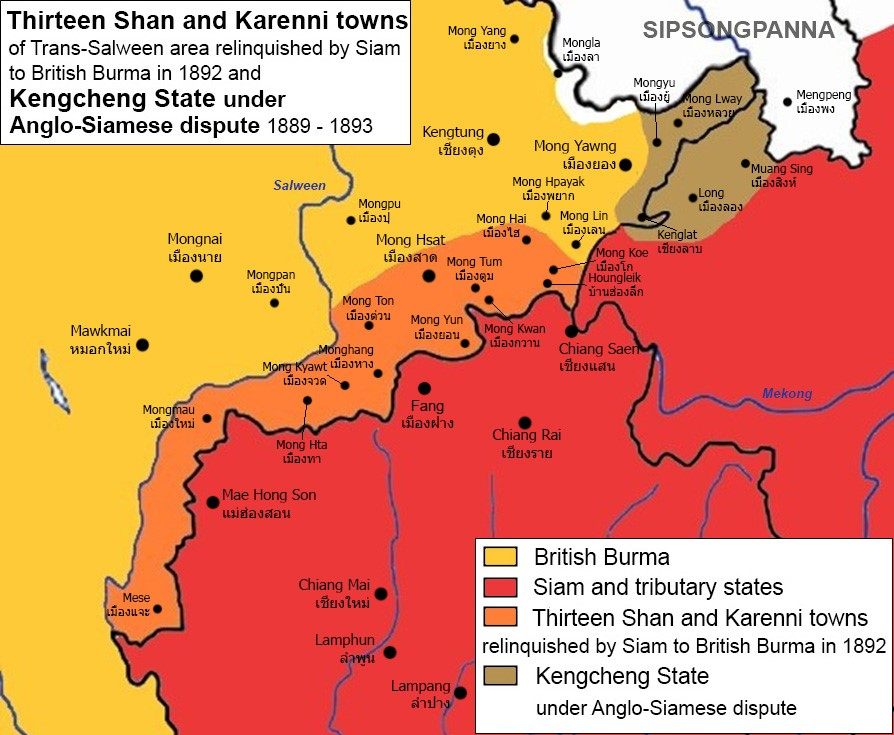
Orange shows Trans-Salween territories relinquished by Siam to British Burma in 1892, defining northern portions of Myanmar-Thailand border.

In 1868, Britain and Siam signed a treaty delimiting the Burma-Thai border from the Salween south to the Andaman Sea. Following some confusion as to the border's location, on the ground demarcation of the border commenced from 1889 to 1892. In 1892 the northern section of the border delimited and then demarcated on the ground from 1893 to 1894, with a final boundary treaty with maps signed on 17 October 1894. The northern terminus of the border was fixed in 1896 when the British and French agreed that the Mekong would serve as the Burma–Laos border. Some minor boundary adjustments occurred in 1929 and 1934. In 1941, following Japan's invasion of Burma, parts of Burma were ceded to Siam as the Saharat Thai Doem territory. These areas were returned to Burma in 1946 following Japan's defeat and since then the border has remained in place. In 1937 Burma was separated from India and became a separate colony, gaining full independence in 1948, at which point the border became an international frontier between two sovereign states.

At present, there is an outstanding dispute over the ownership of some small islands in the Andaman Sea.

From 2010 to 2012 there were clashes along the border between the Myanmar army and the Karen National Liberation Army.

In 2021, the Myanmar military clashed with civilians in the border areas. Many of them fled and ended up in Thailand.

In 2023 there were more clashes and the governments of both countries decided to form a humanitarian task force to facilitate assistance for people displaced by the fighting.

== Border crossings ==
As of 2019, there were 6 permanent border crossings, 1 temporary border crossing, 13 checkpoints for border trade and 1 special checkpoint for border trade.

=== Permanent border crossings ===
No	Myanmar	Thailand			Notes
No	Border post	Road	Border post	Opening hours	Notes
1	Tachileik, Shan State	1	Mae Sai 1, Mae Sai District, Chiang Rai	0630 - 2100	The border crossing is via the First Bridge over the Sai River.
2	Tachileik, Shan State	1041	Mae Sai 2, Mae Sai District, Chiang Rai	0630 -1830	The border crossing is via the Second Bridge over the Sai River.
3	Myawaddy, Kayin State	12	Mae Sot 1, Mae Sot District, Tak	0530 - 2030	The border crossing is via the First Thai-Myanmar Friendship Bridge over the Moei River.
4	Myawaddy, Kayin State	130	Mae Sot 2, Mae Sot District, Tak	0630 - 1830	The border crossing is via the Second Thai-Myanmar Friendship Bridge over the Moei River.
5	Htee Kee, Dawei, Tanintharyi Region	3229	Ban Phu Nam Ron, Mueang Kanchanaburi District, Kanchanaburi	0600 - 2000	
6	Kawthaung, Tanintharyi Region	-	Bang Rin Fisheries Pier, Mueang Ranong District, Ranong	0630 - 0000	Ferry Border Crossing. Consists of checkpoints located adjacent to 4 separate piers on the Thai side.
6	Kawthaung, Tanintharyi Region	-	Pak Nam Ranong, Mueang Ranong District, Ranong	0630 - 0000	Ferry Border Crossing. Consists of checkpoints located adjacent to 4 separate piers on the Thai side.
6	Kawthaung, Tanintharyi Region	-	Ranong Customs Pier, Mueang Ranong District, Ranong	0630 - 0000	Ferry Border Crossing. Consists of checkpoints located adjacent to 4 separate piers on the Thai side.
6	Kawthaung, Tanintharyi Region	-	Andaman Club Pier, Mueang Ranong District, Ranong	0630 - 0000	Ferry Border Crossing. Consists of checkpoints located adjacent to 4 separate piers on the Thai side.

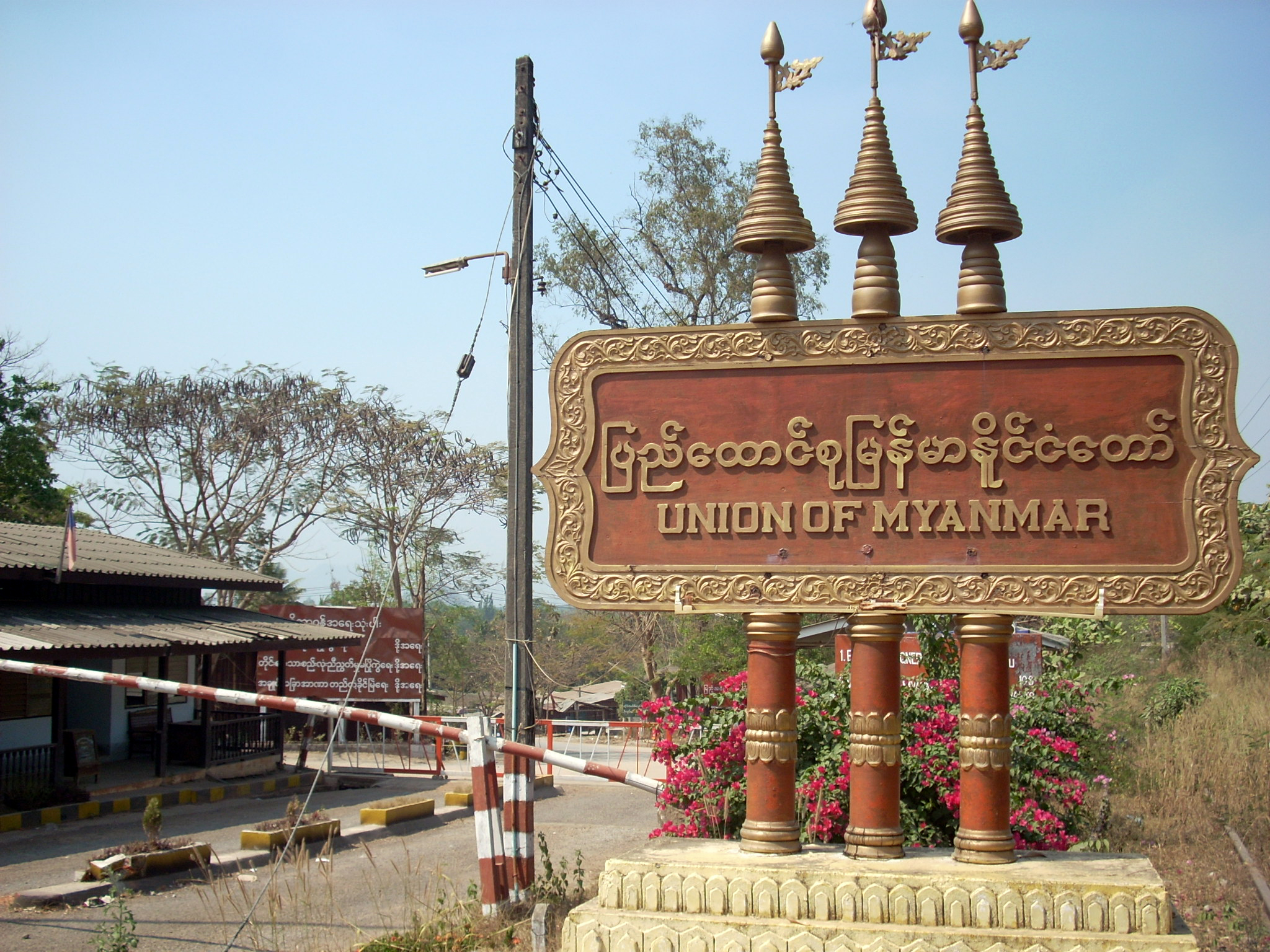
Myanmar welcome sign at the Three Pagodas Pass

=== Temporary border crossings ===
These border crossings are open for foreigners for travel purposes only.

No	Myanmar	Thailand			Notes
No	Border post	Road	Border post	Opening hours	Notes
1	Payathonzu, Kayin State	323	Dan Phra Chedi Sam Ong (Three Pagodas Pass), Sangkhla Buri District, Kanchanaburi	0830 - 1800	

=== Checkpoints for border trade ===
These border crossings are open for cross-border local trade only. There are 13 checkpoints for border trade officially recognized by the Ministry of Interior, located in Chiang Rai, Chiang Mai, Mae Hong Son and Ranong provinces. Entering the opposite country beyond these checkpoints and their associated markets is illegal.

=== Special checkpoint for border trade ===
One special checkpoint for border trade is planned as a future permanent crossing. Entering the opposite country beyond these checkpoints and their associated markets is currently illegal.

No	Myanmar	Thailand			Notes
No	Border post	Road	Border post	Opening hours	Notes
1	Mawdaung, Tanintharyi Region	1039	Dan Singkhon (Singkhon Pass), Mueang Prachuap Khiri Khan District, Prachuap Khiri Khan	0630 - 1800	

== Gallery ==
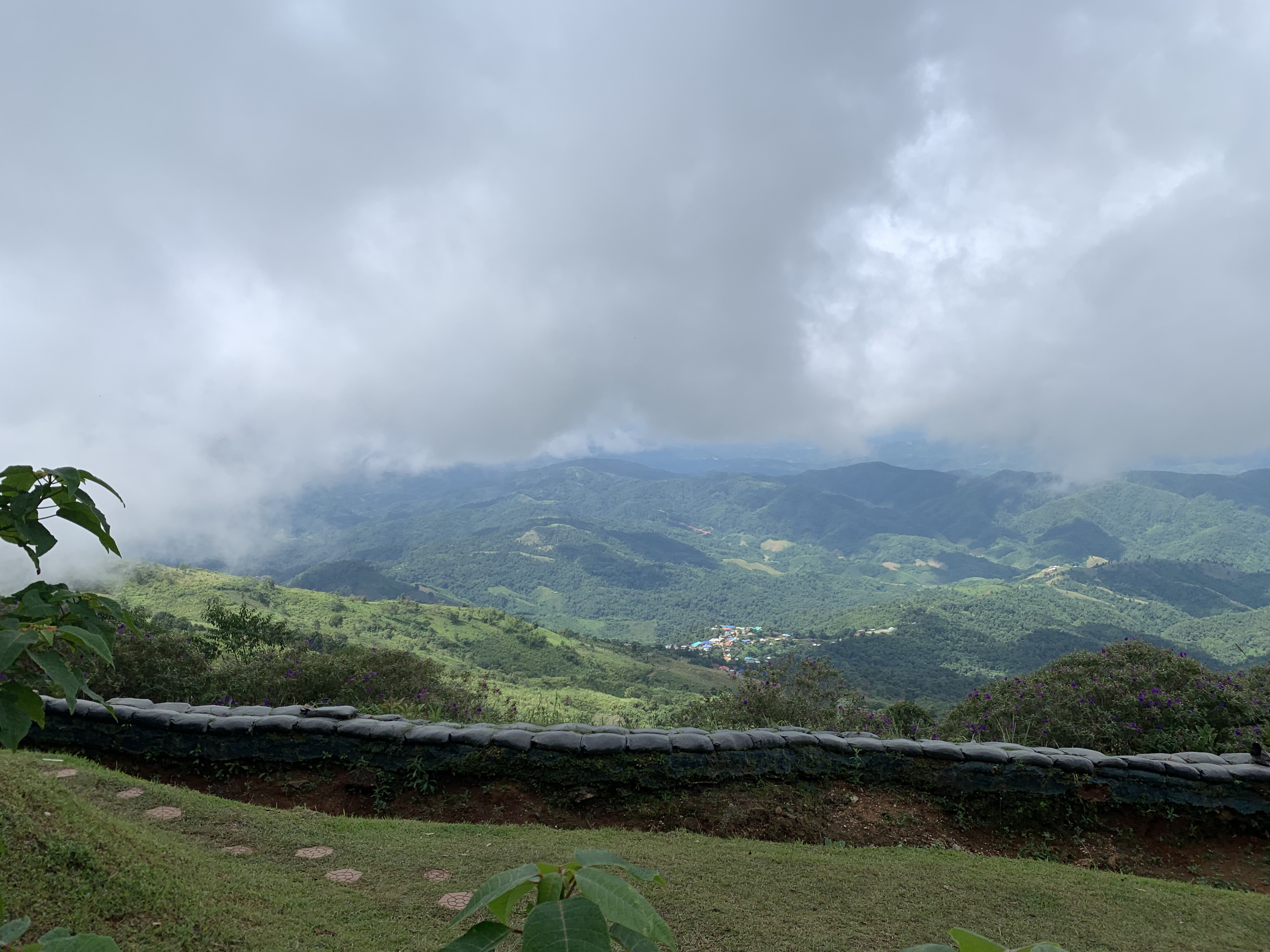
A scenic viewpoint of the border along the Daen Lao Range from Thailand's Mae Sai District

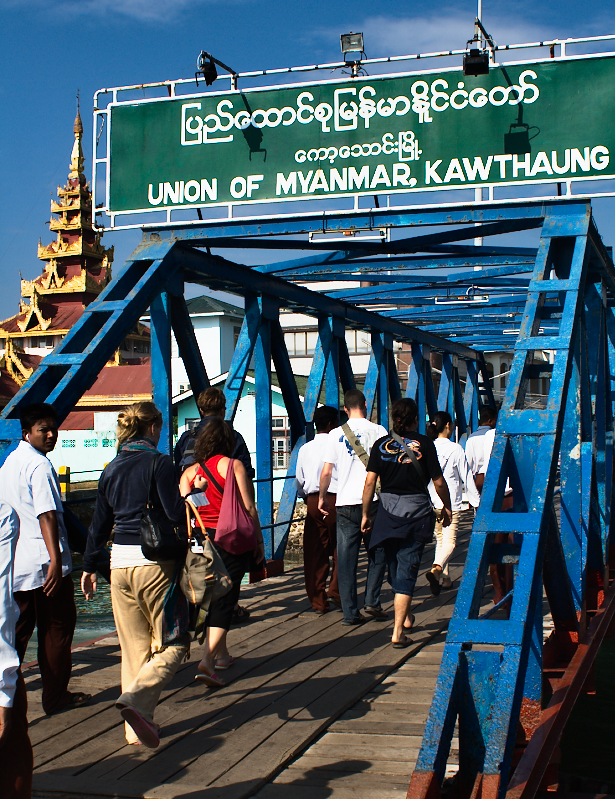
Pier at Kawthaung

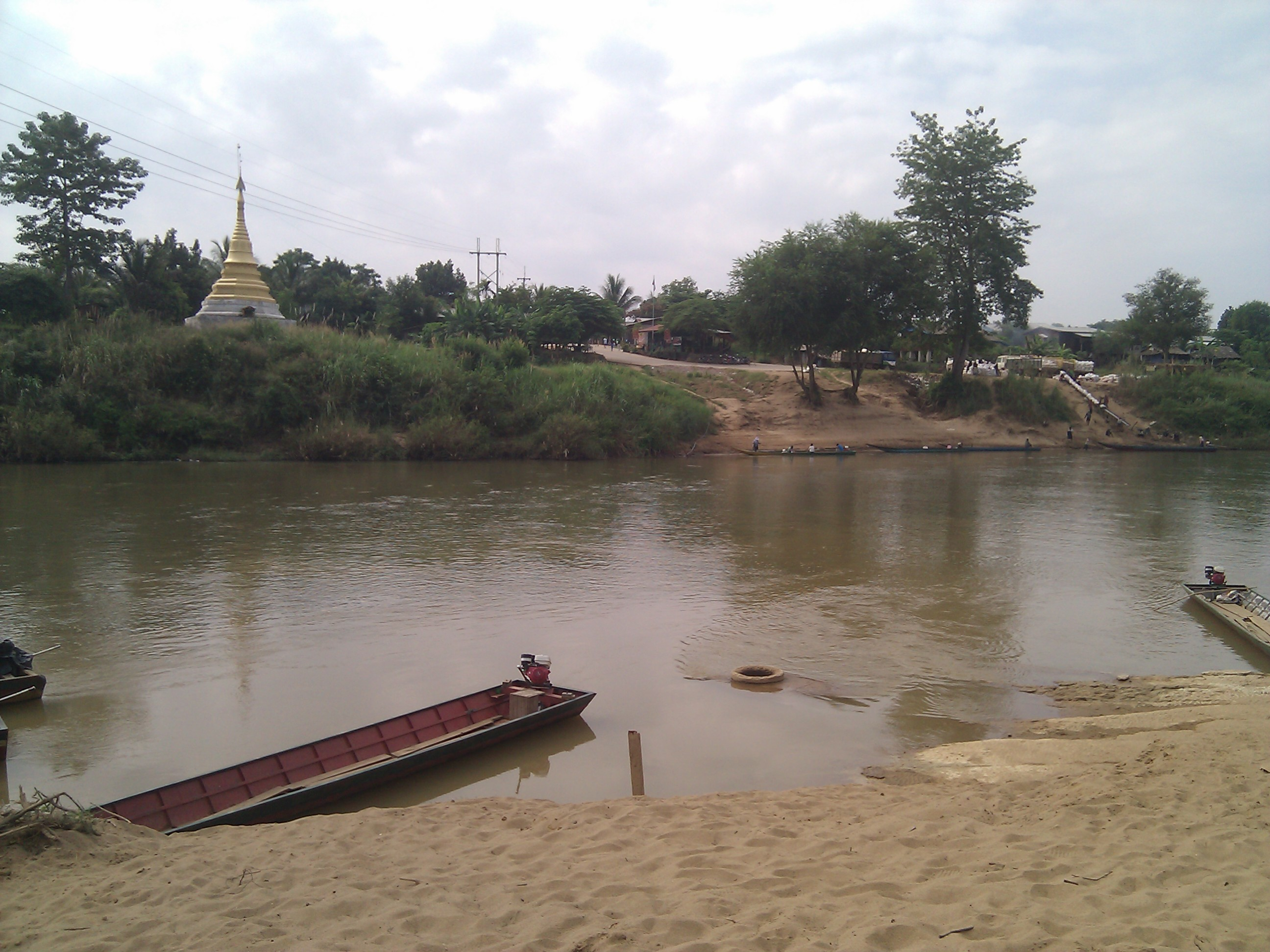
The border along the Moei river, with Myanmar on the opposite bank

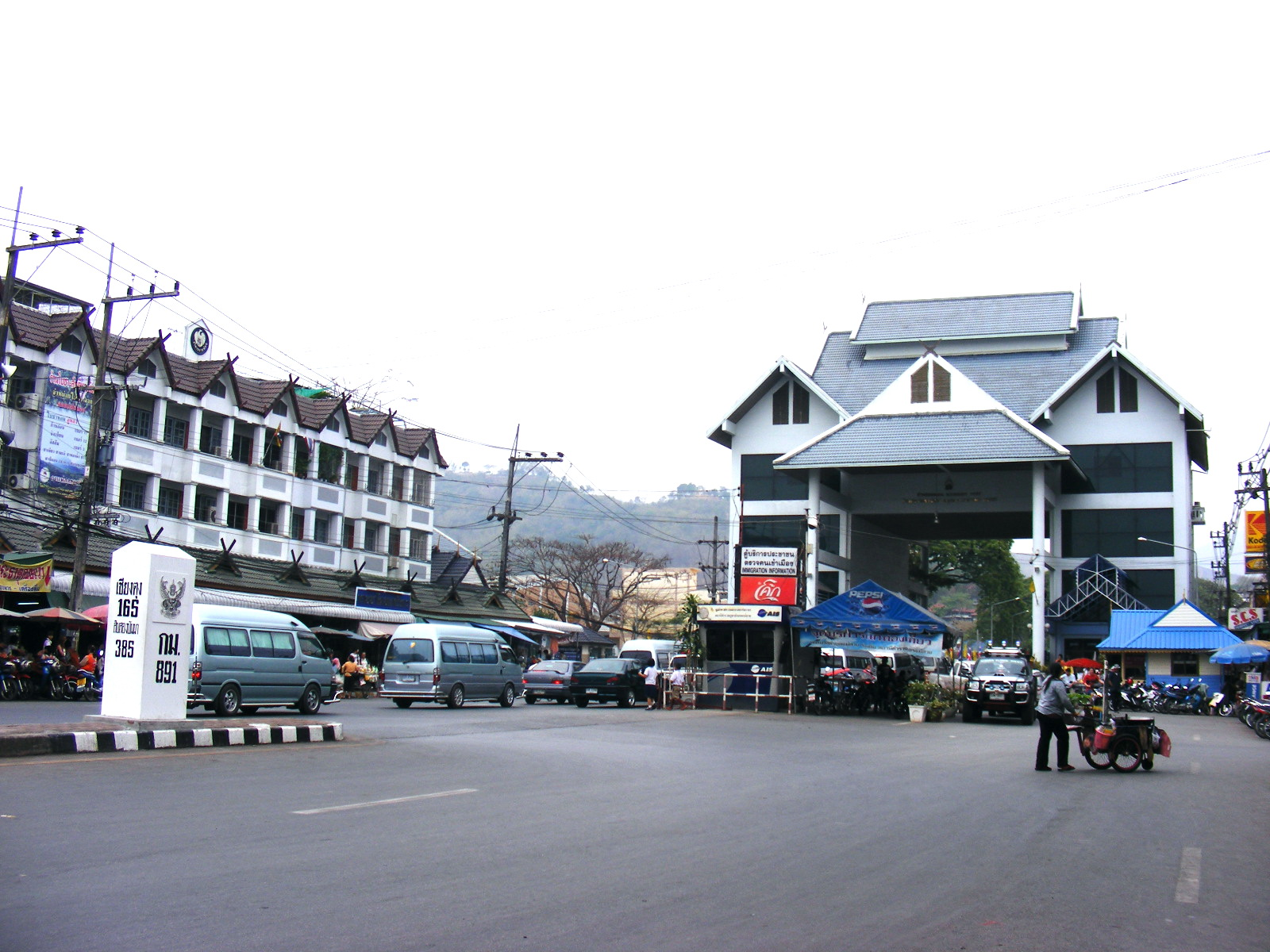
Border gate at Mae Sai

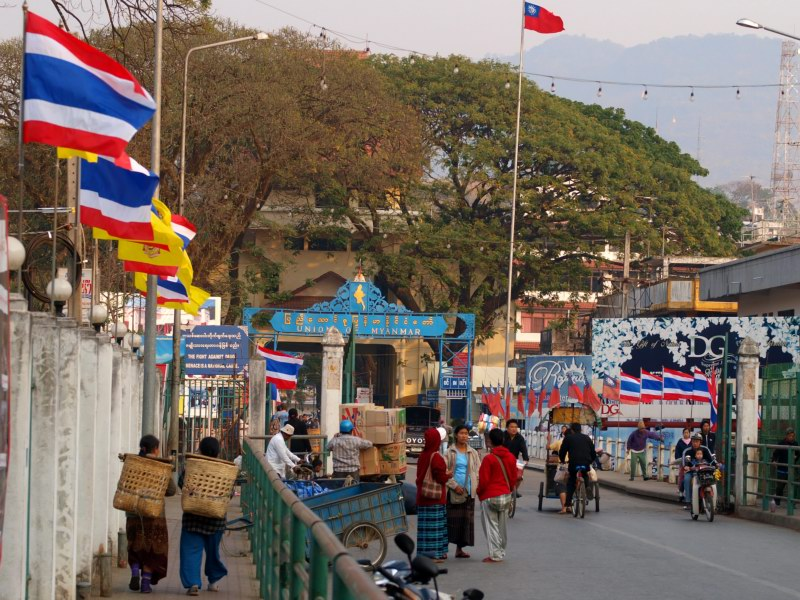
The border bridge at Tachilek

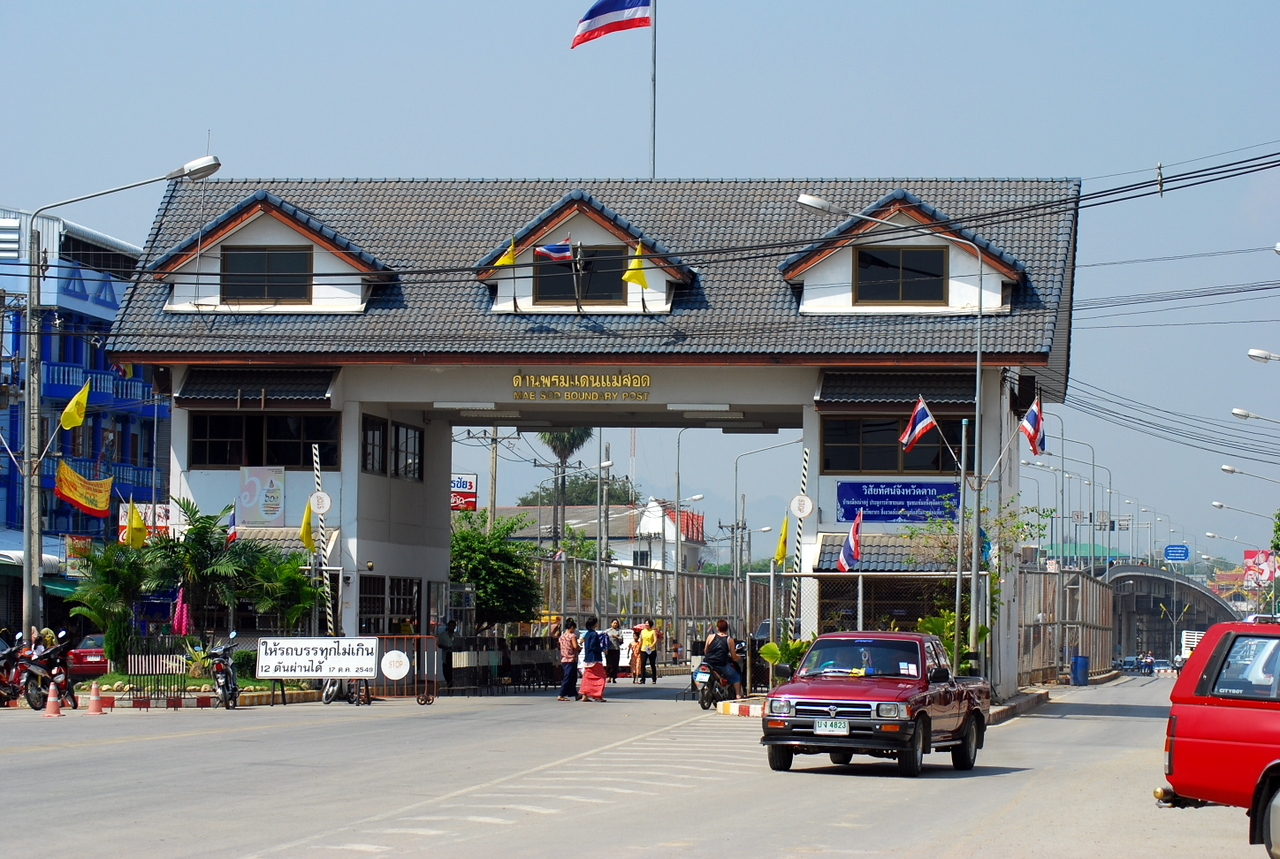
Mae Sot border crossing

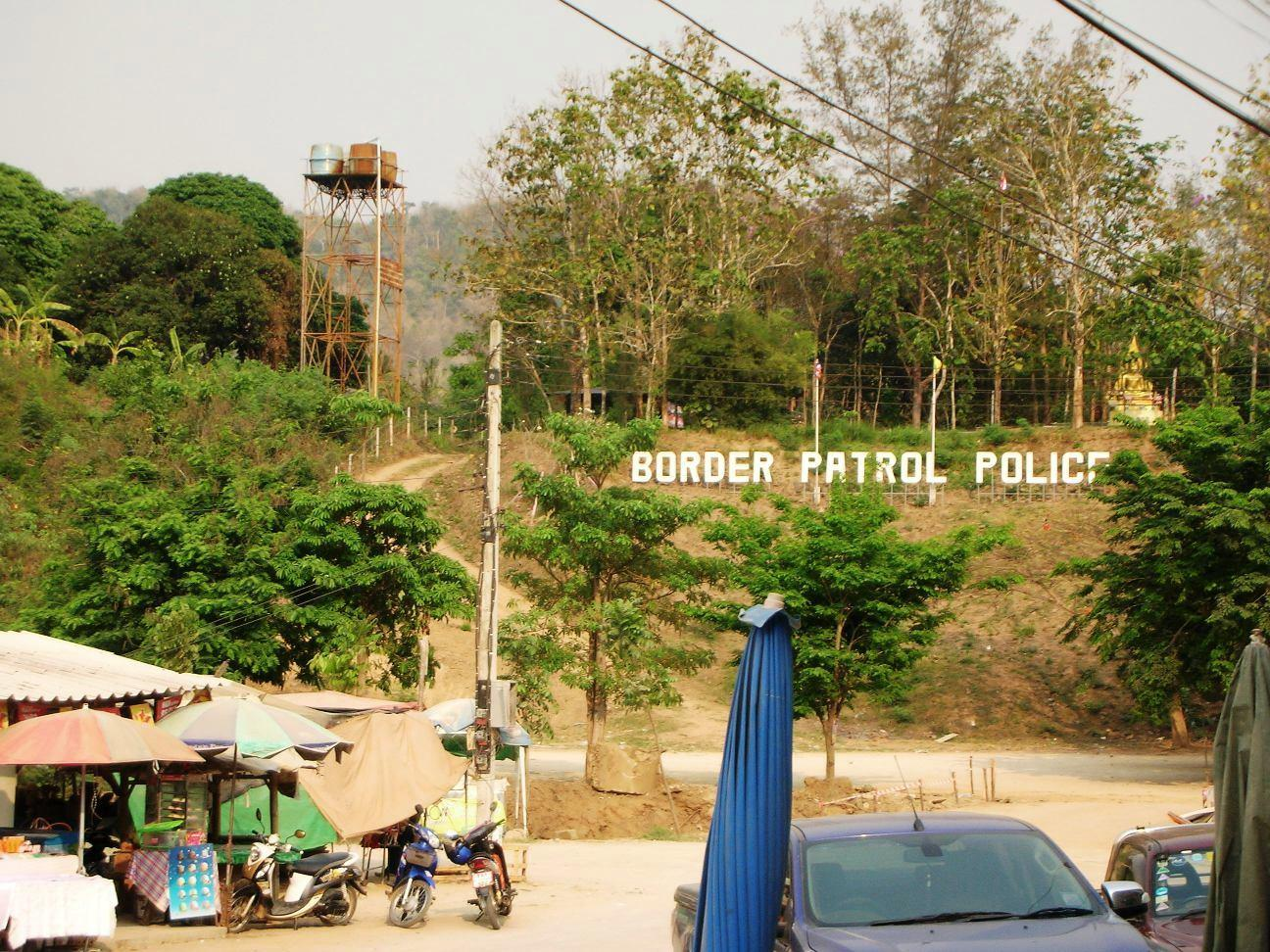
Border control gate at Dan Sing Khon

== See also ==
- Myanmar–Thailand relations
