= 2023 Myawaddy bombing =

- Part of Myanmar civil war (2021-present)
- Location: Myawaddy, Kayin State, Myanmar
- Date: September 3, 2023
- Target: Tatmadaw and police
- Deaths: 6
- Injuries: 10
- Perpetrator: Federal Wings

On September 3, 2023, two bombs allegedly dropped by Federal Wings, a People's Defence Force-aligned militia, killed six Tatmadaw soldiers and injured ten others in Myawaddy, Kayin State, Myanmar.

== Background ==
In 2021, the Tatmadaw overthrew the government of Myanmar and installed a dictatorship, inflaming several low-level conflicts into a large civil war, and fomenting the foundation of the People's Defence Force (PDF). The PDF experimented with drones and drone-dropped bombs to target Tatmadaw forces in major cities outside of PDF control. The PDF in Kayin State works with the Karen National Liberation Army (KNLA), an established anti-junta group.

== Bombing ==
The bombing took place on the evening on September 3, 2023. Two bombs dropped from drones targeted the Myawaddy district police office and an administrative office. While security officials were recuperating their losses, another two bombs were dropped. Five people were killed in the bombing and eleven more were injured. A military officer, two police officers, and two administrative workers were killed, and all of the wounded were "junior and senior" police officers. The officer's name was Lt. Col. Aung Kyaw Min, and he was serving as the temporary commander of a battalion based in Myawaddy. Another police officer was reported to have died on Sept. 4 from his injuries. Two other officers were transferred to a hospital in Thailand for better care.

The PDF-aligned group Federal Wings claimed responsibility for the bombing. In the statement claiming responsibility, Federal Wings called on civilians to leave government positions and stay away from them for their own safety.
