= Salinee Tavaranan =

Mechanical engineer

Salinee Tavaranan Hurley
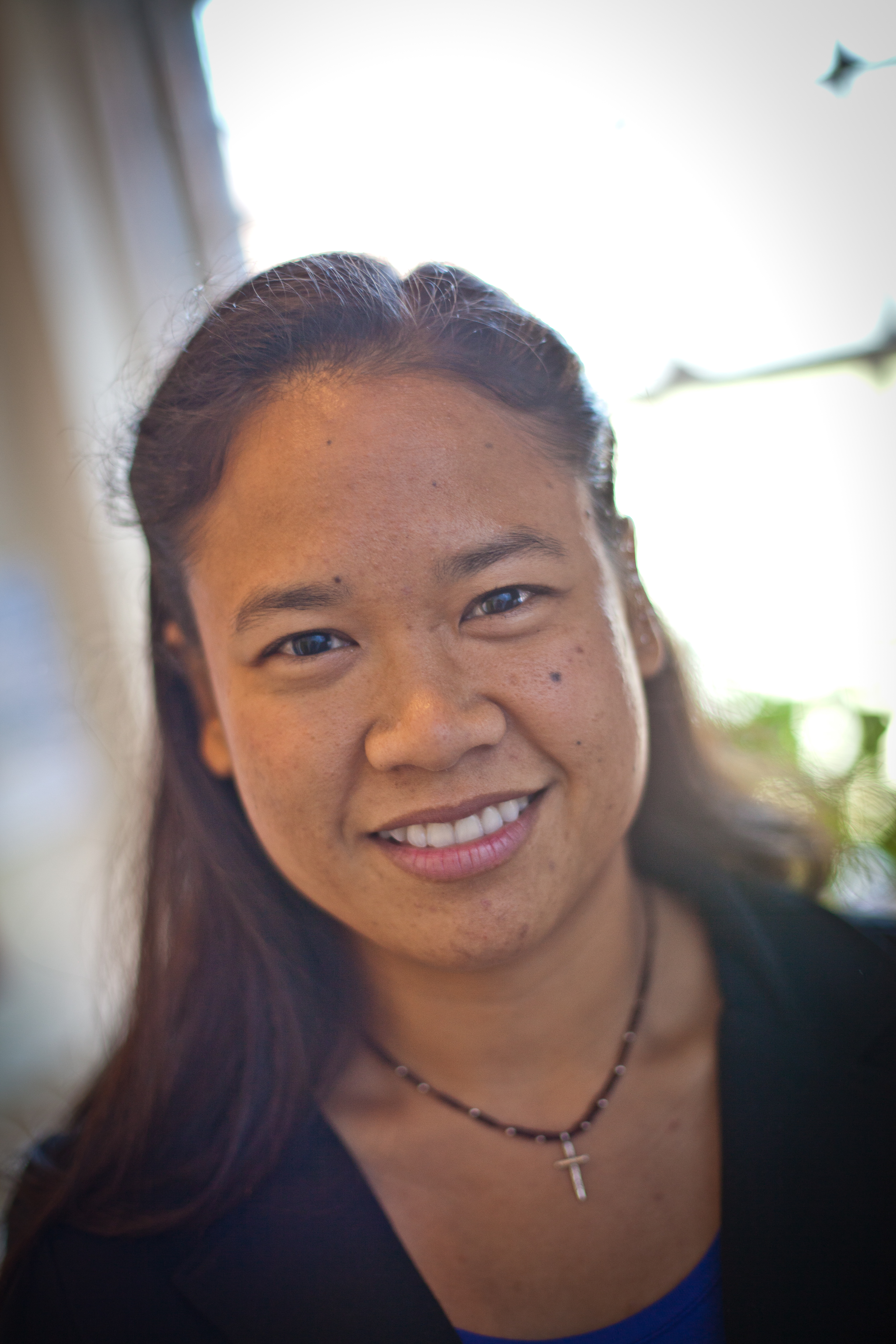
- Born: c.1978
- Education: Chulalongkorn University, University of Massachusetts
- Awards: Cartier Women's Initiative Awards, 2014
- Scientific career
- Fields: Mechanical engineer, Solar energy, Micro-hydro energy
- Workplaces: Border Green Energy Team (BGET), SunSawang Company Limited

External videos
- “Salinee Tavaranan: Micro-energy”, PopTech
- ”Salinee Tavaranan, CEO and Founder, SunSawang Co. Ltd”
- Meet our Asia Pacific finalist 2014: Salinee Tavaranan, Cartier Women's Initiative Awards

Salinee Tavaranan is a Thai mechanical engineer who specializes in solar power and other forms of sustainable energy. She is the project director of Border Green Energy Team (BGET) and the CEO and founder of the company SunSawang, making green energy systems available to remote populations. She received a 2014 Cartier Women's Initiative Award for her work providing renewable energy to remote areas in Thailand.

== Education ==
Tavaranan was born in about 1978 and she grew up on the island of Phuket, located in southern Thailand. She received a bachelor's degree in mechanical engineering from Chulalongkorn University in Thailand in 2001. She then earned a master's degree in solar energy engineering from the University of Massachusetts in 2003.

== Career ==
Tavaranan had just started a Ph.D. program when she was offered the job of project director with Border Green Energy Team (BGET). She returned to Thailand to join the project. Border Green is a non-governmental organization (NGO) which works with villagers to install green energy systems utilizing solar, micro-hydro power, and biogas. One of the reasons for training local villagers is that areas may not be reachable in the rainy season. BGET has worked with refugees at the Mae La refugee camp near the border between Thailand and Burma as well as villagers in remote areas. This work enabled people to gain access to much needed resources including water, lights, classrooms with computers, medics and health care resources.

In 2004, the Thai government had supported an initiative to install solar home systems in nearly 300,000 Thai households in remote areas which did not have access to the national energy grid. Follow-up research by the United Nations Development Programme several years later showed that 80% of the systems had not been maintained and were no longer used. In 2011, BGET carried out a 300-person pilot program to test the feasibility of providing solar energy products and maintenance services for a fee, to develop a more sustainable model for local green energy development.

In March 2013, Salinee Tavaranan created her startup SunSawang to provide maintenance services for solar powered systems. The company recruited and trained technicians to maintain the equipment provided by the previous government initiative. Expensive photovoltaic panels are generally salvageable and are reused with relatively inexpensive components such as micro-hydro turbines, solar-powered lanterns and cell phone chargers. Initially higher starting costs are balanced against lower ongoing costs by offering five-year payment plans. In 2014, the company focused on working with inhabitants in the Tak region, an area of forests and national parks near the Thai-Burmese border. Salinee Tavaranan continued to work to some extent with BGET as well as with SunSawang.

She received one of the Cartier Women's Initiative Awards in 2014 for her work providing renewable energy to remote areas in Thailand. Salinee Tavaranan was included in the BBC's 2014 list featuring 100 Women internationally.
