= Myanmar–Thailand relations =

- Myanmar: Thailand

Diplomatic mission
- Embassy of Myanmar, Bangkok: Royal Thai Embassy, Yangon

Envoy
- Ambassador Zaw Zaw Soe: Ambassador Mongkol Visitstump

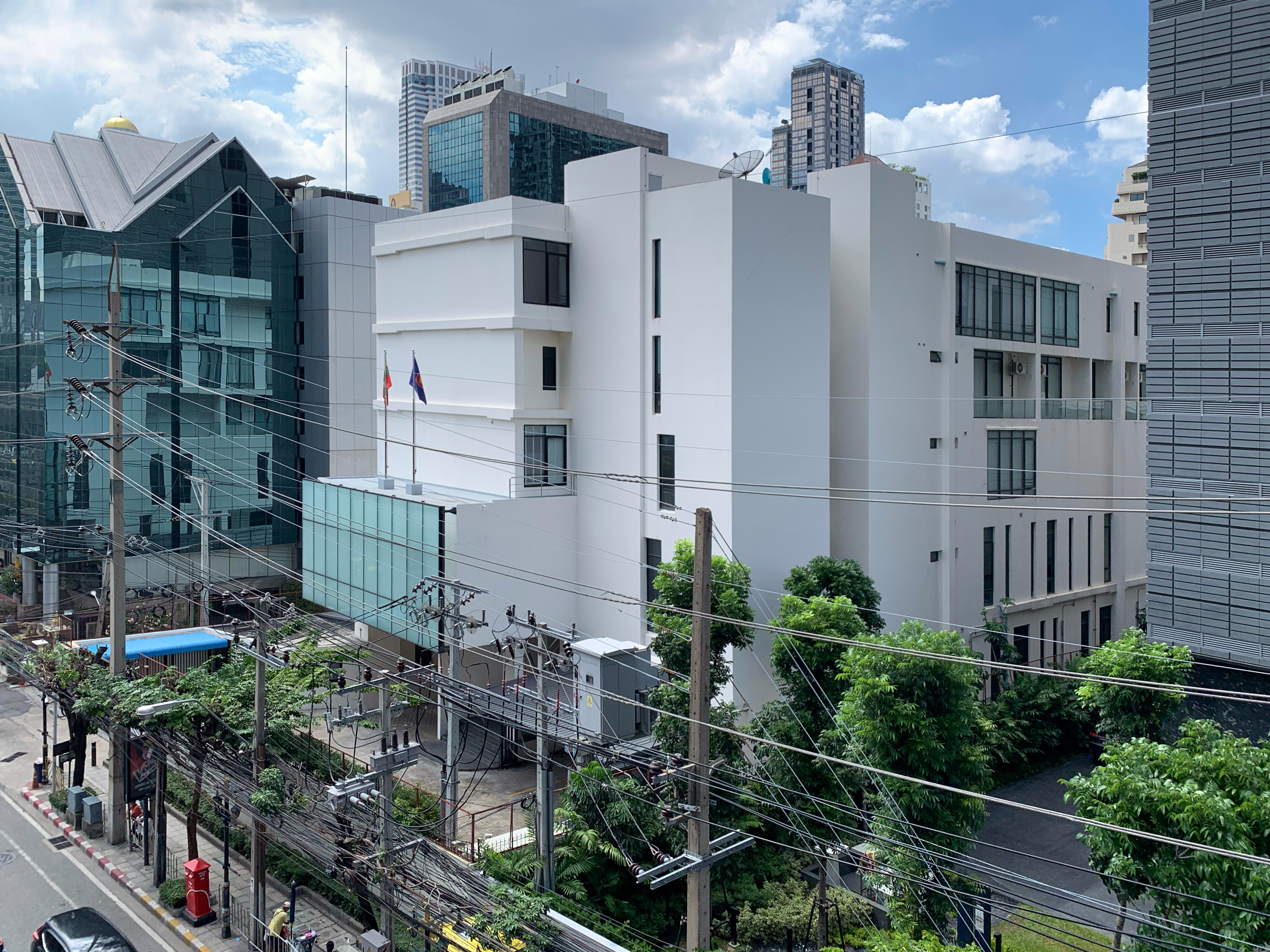
Embassy of Myanmar, Bangkok

Myanmar–Thailand relations refers to the current and historical relations between Myanmar (also known as Burma) and Thailand. Myanmar has an embassy in Bangkok, while Thailand has an embassy in Yangon. In recent decades, relations between Burma and Thailand have focused mainly on economic issues and trade. Burmese-Thai relations have been shaped by a long and complex history, marked by periods of cooperation, conflict, and political maneuvering. Both nations have shared cultural, religious, and geopolitical interests, yet their interactions have often been characterized by rivalry and territorial disputes. There is sporadic conflict between Myanmar and Thailand over three disputed islands.

== Cultural relations ==
=== Nationalism ===
Thai nationalism plays a significant role in shaping how Thailand views Myanmar. The notion of Thailand as an independent nation-state that resisted foreign domination resonates strongly in Thai nationalism, positioning Burma as a historical aggressor in this narrative. Historic conflicts between Siamese and Burmese kingdoms and the Fall of Ayutthaya in 1767 have contributed to this prevailing view in Thai discourse. Thai cinematic depictions of these historical conflicts, including King Naresuan, Suriyothai, and Bang Rajan, have glorified these conflicts to stimulate patriotism. Damrong Rajanubhab's Our Wars with the Burmese is "responsible for popularizing the image of the Burmese as an enemy of the Thai nation," and has been instrumental in shaping Thai views on the Burmese. In recent years, Thais have begun re-examining their understanding of Thai history in relation to the Burmese.

== Historical relations ==
=== Burmese–Siamese War (1547–1549) ===
The Burmese–Siamese war of 1547–1549 was the first of many wars fought between the Burmese of Pegan and the Siamese of Ayutthaya. The war began with an invasion by King Tabinshwehti of the Taungoo Dynasty through the Three Pagodas Pass into Siamese territory, which presaged an attack on the capital city of Ayutthaya itself. The invasion came after a political crisis in Ayutthaya that had ended with the placing of Maha Chakkraphat on the Siamese thrones.

The war is notable for the introduction of early modern warfare by Portuguese mercenaries. It is most notable in the history of Thailand for the valiant death in battle of Siamese Queen Suriyothai on her war elephant. As a result, the conflict is often referred to in Thailand as the War that led to the loss of Queen Suriyothai.

=== Burmese–Siamese War (1594–1605) ===
The Burmese–Siamese War (1594–1605) was the war caused by the vengeance of Siam towards the Burmese rule. King Naresuan of Ayutthaya was planning to conquer Burma. The war began with Siamese attacks on and occupation of the cities of Tenasserim and Myeik, then proceeded to Toungoo.

=== Burmese–Siamese War (1765–1767) ===
The Burmese–Siamese War (1765–1767) was the second military conflict between the Konbaung Dynasty of Burma and the Ban Phlu Luang Dynasty of Siam (Thailand), and the war that ended the four-century-old Siamese kingdom. Nonetheless, the Burmese were soon forced to give up their hard-won gains when the Chinese invasions of their homeland forced a complete withdrawal by the end of 1767. A new Siamese dynasty, to which the current Thai monarchy traces its origin, emerged to reunify Siam by 1770.

This war was the continuation of the war of 1759–1760. The casus belli of this war were also the control of the Tenasserim coast and its trade, and the Siamese support for the rebels in the Burmese border regions. The war began in August 1765 when a 20,000-strong northern Burmese army invaded northern Siam, and was joined in by three southern armies of over 20,000 in October, in a pincer movement on Ayutthaya. By late January 1766, the Burmese armies had overcome numerically superior but poorly coordinated Siamese defences, and converged before the Siamese capital.

The siege of Ayutthaya began during the first Chinese invasion of Burma. The Siamese believed that if they could hold out until the rainy season, the seasonal flooding of the Ayutthayan central plain would force a retreat. But King Hsinbyushin of Burma believed that the Chinese war was a minor border dispute, and decided to continue the siege. During the rainy season of 1766 (June–October), the battle moved to the waters of the flooded plain but failed to change the status quo. When the dry season came, the Chinese launched a much larger invasion but Hsinbyushin still refused to recall the troops. In March 1767, King Ekkathat of Siam offered to become a tributary but the Burmese demanded an unconditional surrender. On 7 April 1767, the Burmese sacked the starving city for the second time in history, committing atrocities that have left a major black mark on Burmese-Thai relations to the present day. Thousands of Siamese captives were relocated to Burma.

The Burmese occupation was short-lived. In November 1767, the Chinese again invaded with their largest force yet, finally convincing Hsinbyushin to withdraw his forces from Siam. In the ensuing Siamese civil war, Taksin's Thonburi forces emerged the sole winner by mid-1770. The Burmese had also defeated a fourth Chinese invasion by December 1769.

By then, a new stalemate had taken hold. Burma had annexed the lower Tenasserim coast but again failed to eliminate Siam as the sponsor of rebellions in her eastern and southern borderlands. In the following years, Hsinbyushin was preoccupied by the Chinese threat, and did not renew the Siamese war until 1775—only after Lan Na had revolted again with Siamese support. The post-Ayutthaya Siamese leadership proved more than capable; they defeated the next two invasions (1775–1776 and 1785–1786), and annexed Lan Na in the process.

=== Burmese–Siamese War (1785–1786) ===
Bodawpaya of Burma pursued his ambitious campaigns to expand his dominions. The Burmese-Siamese War (1785–1786) was called “Nine Armies War” by Siam because the Burmese came in nine armies. The armies surged into Lan Na and Northern Siam, yet the governor of Lampang managed to partly halt the Burmese, waiting for the troops from Bangkok. As Phitsanulok was captured, Rama I himself led an army to the north.

In the south, Bodawpaya was waiting at Three Pagodas Pass. The Front Palace led his troops to the south the counter-attacked the Burmese came from Ranong through Nakhon Si Thammarat and the engagements occurred at Kanchanaburi. The Burmese also attacked Thalang (Phuket), where to governor had just died. Chan, wife of the governor, and her sister Mook gathered people to defend Thalang against the Burmese. Today, Chan and Mook are revered as two heroines opposing the Burmese invasions.

The Burmese proceeded to capture Songkhla. Upon hearing the news, the governors of Phatthalung fled. However, a monk named Phra Maha encouraged the citizens to turn up their arms against the Burmese. Phra Maha was later raised to nobility by Rama I.

As his armies were destroyed, Bodawpaya retreated, only to renew attacks the next year (1786). Bodawpaya, this time, didn't divide his troops but instead formed into single army. Bodawpaya passed through the Chedi Sam Ong and settled in Ta Din Dang. The Front Palace marched the Siamese forces to face Bodawpaya. The fighting was very short and Bodawpaya was quickly defeated. This short war was called “Ta Din Dang campaign”.

=== 19th century relations ===
In the 19th century, Burma became a colony of the British Empire. This prevented any Burmese-Siamese conflict.

=== World War II ===
In 1942, Thailand sent the Phayap Army to occupy the Shan State and Kayah State of Burma. Diplomatic relations were established in 1948.

== Political relations ==
Recently, Prime Minister Abhisit Vejjajiva made clear that dialogue encouraging political change is a priority for Thailand, but not through economic sanctions. He also made clear to reconstruct temples damaged in the aftermath of Cyclone Nargis. However, there were tensions over detained opposition leader Aung San Suu Kyi, with Thailand calling for her release. She was released in 2010.

=== Disputed territory ===
As of 2020, sovereignty over three Andaman Sea islands remains disputed. The standing agreement, negotiated in February 1982, left undetermined the status of Ginga Island (Ko Lam), Ko Kham, and Ko Ki Nok at the mouth of the Kraburi River (Pakchan River). Subsequent negotiations in 1985, 1989, and 1990 made no progress. The two parties have designated the islands as "no man's land". Ongoing tensions in the area resulted in minor clashes in 1998, 2001, 2003, and 2013.

=== 2021 unrests in Thailand and Myanmar ===
Both Thailand and Myanmar have been in chaos due to protests (2020–2021 Thai protests and 2021 Myanmar protests) against the military juntas in both countries; there has been solidarity between Thai and Burmese protesters. However, while Thai protests, despite its significance, is mostly peaceful, the Burmese protests were met with brutal repression. The Thai government, led by a former General himself, is accused of helping the Tatmadaw to maintain power in Myanmar, which was denied. At the same time, Burmese refugees have been flowing to Thailand, creating a border crisis and fear of COVID-19 spikes, in which the Thai government was also accused of trying to drive the refugees away, despite having guaranteed not to turn away the refugees.

Thailand was a key ally of the junta with former Prime Minister of Thailand Prayut Chan-o-cha using back-channel contacts in mid-2021 to shape Thailand's diplomatic options, especially as it related to ASEAN. On 30 June 2022, when the Myanmar Air Force allegedly violated Thai airspace, Thailand scrambled a defense attache. Later, Prayuth said that the incident was "not a big deal." After the 2023 Thai general election, the new Prime Minister Srettha Thavisin has shown support for the military's Nationwide Ceasefire Agreement urging all parties in Myanmar to stay on the path for peace and stability.

=== Human Trafficking and Cross-Border Crime ===
Myanmar–Thailand relations in 2025 were tested by a recent crackdown on scam compounds in Myanmar, where thousands of foreign nationals, many victims of human trafficking, remain stranded. After a Chinese actor's abduction in January led to international action, authorities rescued hundreds from criminal-run centres. However, many detainees, housed in a remote camp run by the Democratic Karen Benevolent Army (DKBA) near the Thai border, face dire conditions with limited food, healthcare, and sanitation. With Thailand restricting entry to those with repatriation plans, some detainees struggle to afford flights home, fearing a return to the scam centres.

=== 2025 Myanmar earthquake ===
In March 2025, a major earthquake struck central Myanmar, killing at least 3,085 people and injuring over 4,700, with many still missing. The disaster also caused fatalities in Thailand, where 21 people died. Amid ongoing civil conflict and challenges to aid delivery, Myanmar's junta leader Min Aung Hlaing traveled to Bangkok on 3 April to attend a regional summit of Bay of Bengal nations; an unusual move given his international sanctions. Thailand, the host, proposed a joint statement on the disaster. The junta declared a temporary ceasefire to facilitate relief, though earlier clashes and an incident involving Myanmar troops firing on a Chinese Red Cross convoy complicated the situation. The crisis has intensified calls from humanitarian organizations and the UN for unrestricted aid access ahead of the monsoon season.

=== August 2025 Blockade ===
In August 2025, the State Security and Peace Commission junta closed the Thai–Myanmar Friendship Bridge Crossing No.2 to commercial traffic. All licensed goods are either rerouted to the Mae Sai-Tachileik route or the Ranong–Kawthaung waterway. While military authorities claim that the closure was to regulate trade and clamp down on unlicensed commerce, locals claim that the real motive was to strangle revenue sources of rebel groups such as the Karen National Union and People's Defense Force.

== Military relations ==
=== 2010–2011 Myanmar border clashes ===
The 2010–2012 Myanmar border clashes were a series of ongoing skirmishes between the Myanmar Armed Forces (Tatmadaw) and splinter brigades of the Democratic Karen Buddhist Army (DKBA). The clashes erupted along the border with Thailand shortly after the general election on 7 November 2010. An estimated 10,000 refugees fled into nearby neighbouring Thailand to escape the violent conflict. There was concern that, due to discontent with the elections and speculations of electoral fraud, that the conflict could escalate into a civil war.

== See also ==
- Burmese–Siamese wars
- Foreign relations of Thailand
- Foreign relations of Burma
- History of Thailand
- History of Burma
- Myanmar–Thailand border
