= Mae Sot =

Mae Sot แม่สอด ᨾᩯ᩵ᩈᩬᨯ
- City Municipality
- City of Mae Sot เทศบาลนครแม่สอด ᩅ᩠ᨿᨦᨾᩯ᩵ᩈᩬᨯ
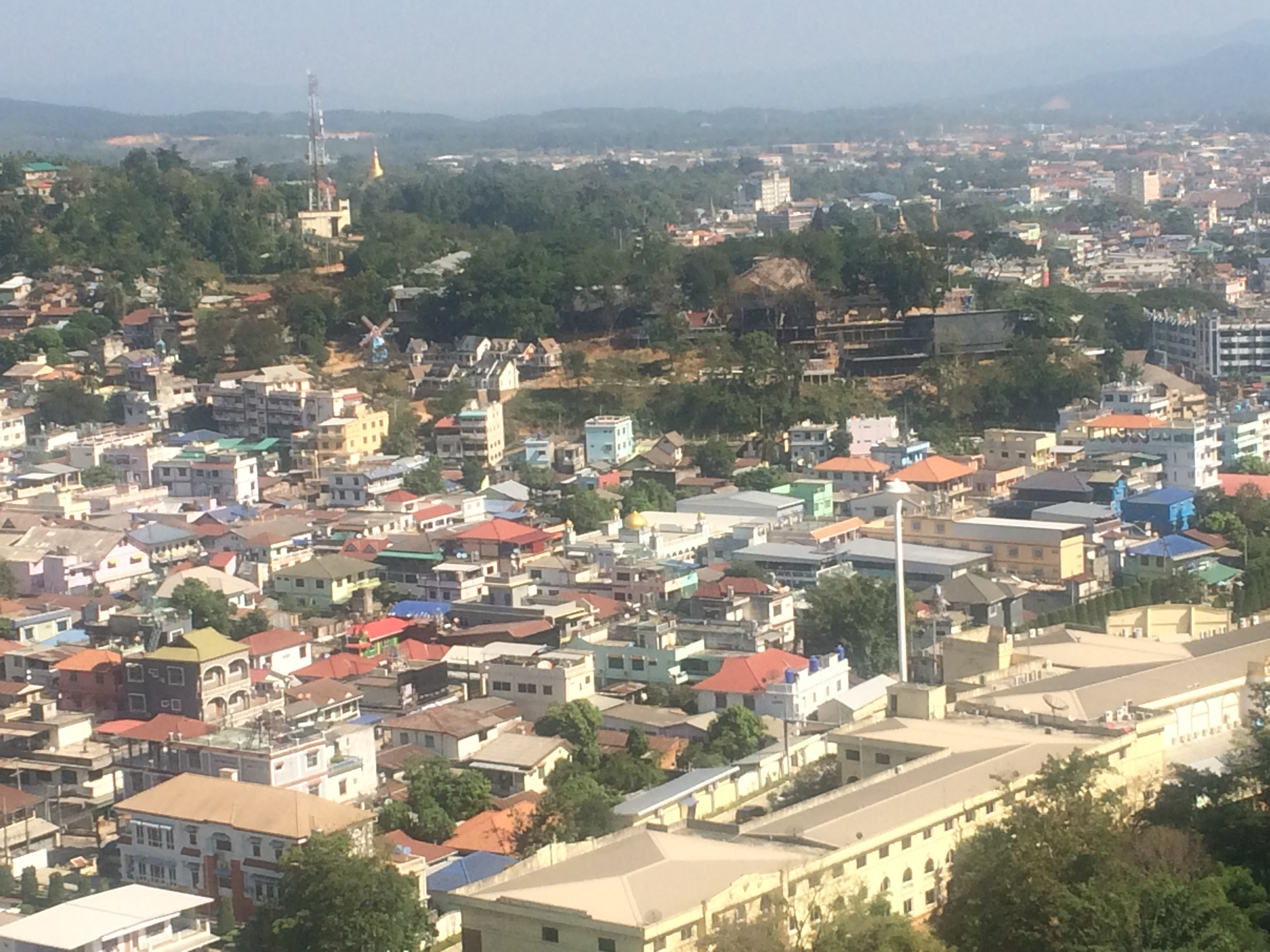
- Aerial view of Mae Sot

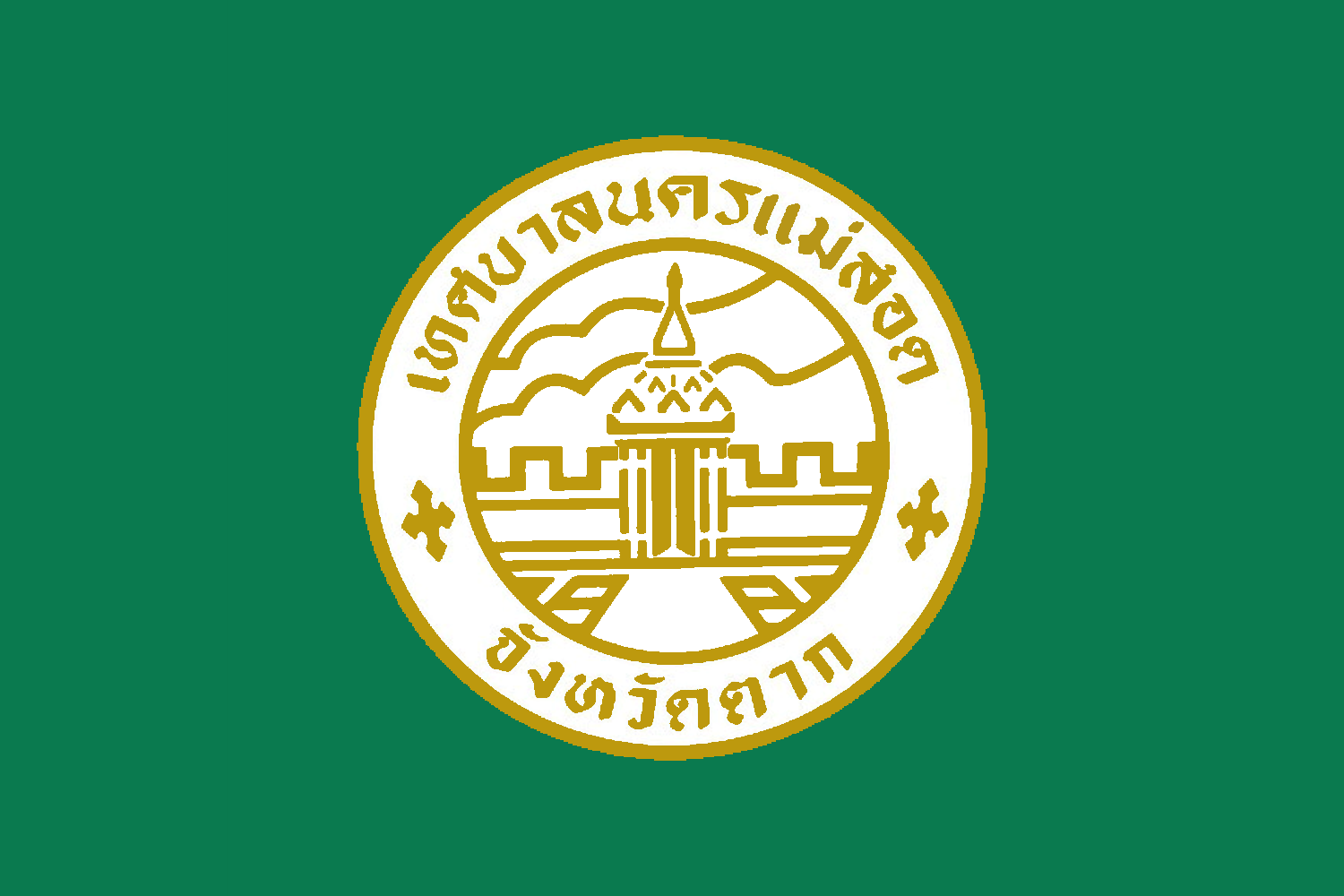
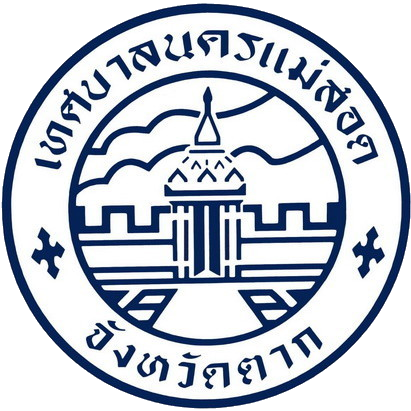
- Flag Seal

- Location in Thailand
- Coordinates: 16°42′47″N 98°34′29″E
- Country: Thailand
- Province: Tak
- District: Mae Sot

Government
  - Type: City Municipality
  - Mayor: Thoedkiat Chinsoranan

Area
  - Total: 27.2 km^{2} (10.5 sq mi)

Population
  - Total: 52,350
  - Density: 1,925/km^{2} (4,990/sq mi)
- Time zone: UTC+07:00 (ICT)
- Postcode: 63110
- Area code: (+66) 55
- Website: nakhonmaesotcity.go.th

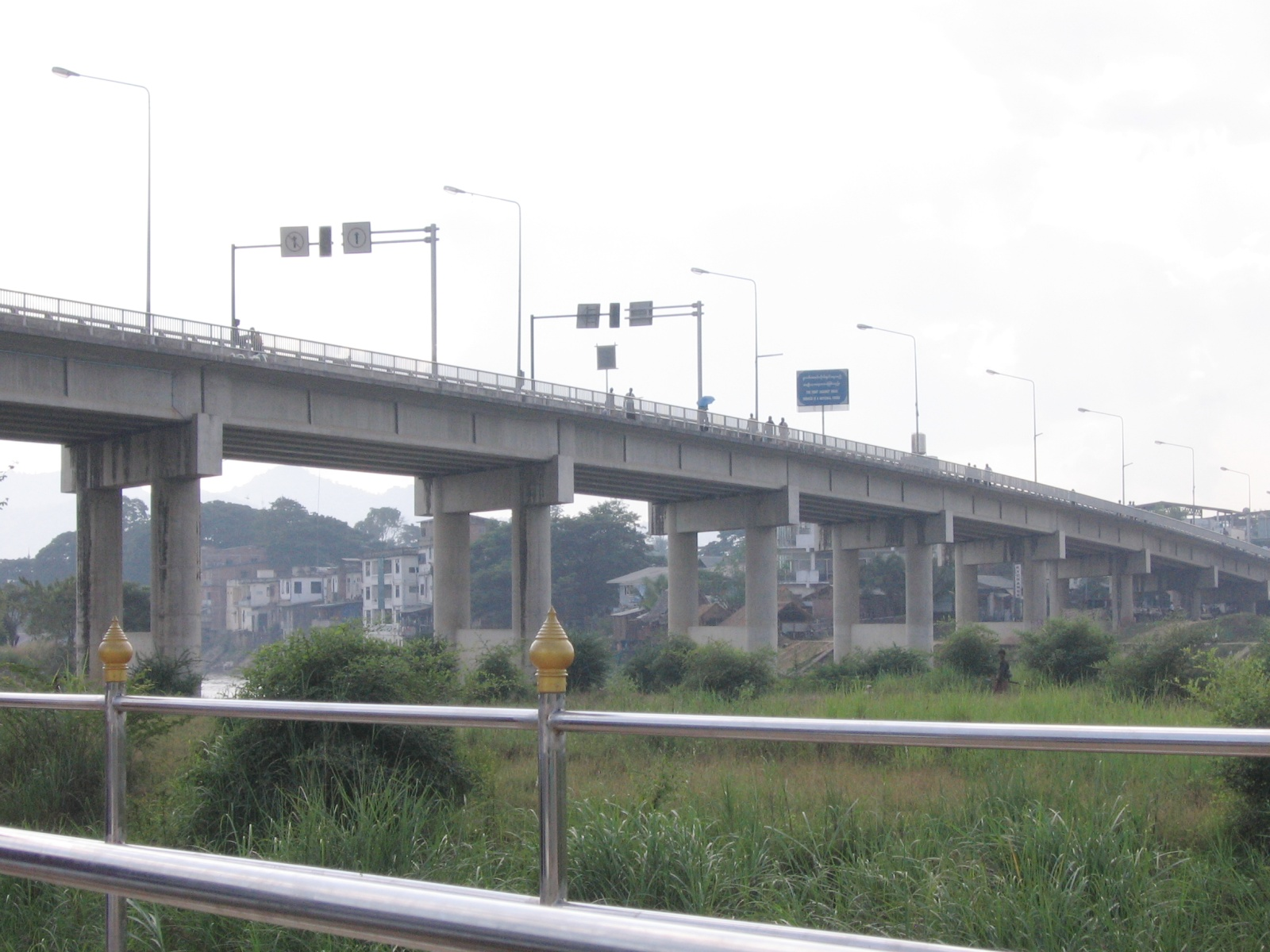
Thai-Myanmar Friendship Bridge in Mae Sot district

Mae Sot (Northern Thai: ᨾᩯ᩵ᩈᩬᨯ; Thai: แม่สอด, pronounced [mɛ̂ː sɔ̀ːt]; Burmese: မဲဆောက်, [mɛ́ sʰaʊʔ]; Shan: မႄႈသွတ်ႇ, [mɛ sʰɔt̚]) is a city in western Thailand that shares a border with Myanmar to the west. It is notable as a trade hub and for its substantial population of Burmese migrants and refugees. The city is part of Tak Province, 87 km from the city of Tak and 492 km from Bangkok. It is home to the district headquarters of Mae Sot District, and is the main gateway between Thailand and Burma. As a result, it has gained notoriety for its trade in gems and teak, as well as black market services such as human trafficking and illicit drugs.

== History ==
In 1937 Mae Sot was a local administration, administered by a headman, usually called village headman or village chief (ผู้ใหญ่บ้าน phu yai ban). Its population at the time was approximately 12,000 people. On 30 September 1939 Mae Sot was established as a municipalitity and governed 27 villages. It was upgraded to a city municipality in 2010.

In 1997, the Thai–Myanmar Friendship Bridge opened across the Moei River connecting Mae Sot with Myawaddy. An additional border crossing, the second Thai-Myanmar Friendship Bridge, was opened in 2019 to the north west of Mae Sot to handle goods traffic.

In recent decades, the city has become home to thousands of Burmese migrants. Industries in Mae Sot have grown, especially in the areas related to international trade and manufacturing in textiles, garments, gemstones, jade and teak. By 2004, the numbers of Burmese migrants in Mae Sot had reached between 70,000 and 100,000.

== Geography ==
The neighboring districts of Mae Sot include Mae Pa tambon administrative organization (TAO) in the north, Mae Tao (TAO) to the south, Mae Pa and Phra That Pha Daeng (TAO) to the east, and the Tha Sai Luat Sub-district Municipality to the west.

== Economy ==
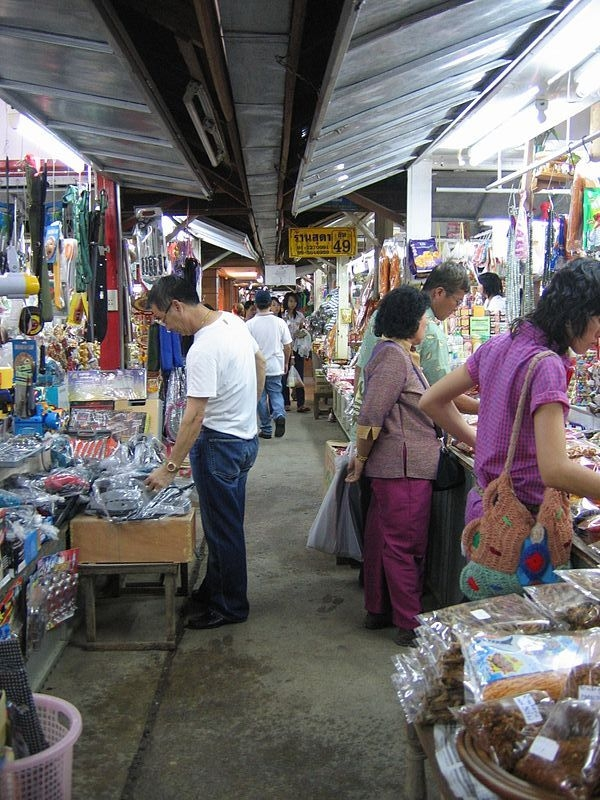
Rim Moei Market

Trade with Burma constitutes the largest portion of Mae Sot's economy. It has an established market for commodities such as wholesale gems and teak. Most of the town's service industries are supported by Burmese migrants who work in sweat-shops and factories throughout the region. The town also suffers from a black market in illegal smuggling, human trafficking, and narcotics. The Thai-Myanmar Friendship Bridge is the primary gateway for trade with Burma. The border region, several kilometres west from central Mae Sot, includes the Rim Moei Market that deals in imported goods and woodwork.

Gen Prayut Chan-o-cha, the junta leader and prime minister, in May 2015 invoked his authority under Section 44 of the Interim Charter to declare the area of Wang Takhian in Tha Sai Luat subdistrict of Mae Sot a special economic zone (SEZ). The current plan is to transform nearly 2,200 rai of land of Tha Sai Luat into an SEZ. The government has offered to compensate displaced villagers at 7,000-12,000 baht per rai of land and resettle villagers in another district of Tak. As of July 2016 the current market price of a rai of land in Mae Sot is almost one million baht, leading villagers to reject the offer.

Mae Sot is located on the East-West Economic Corridor, which connects Burma, Thailand, Laos and Vietnam.

== Climate ==
Mae Sot has a tropical savanna climate (Köppen climate classification Aw). Winters are dry and very warm. Temperatures rise until April, which is very hot with the average daily maximum at 36.8 °C (98.2 °F). The monsoon season runs from May to October, with heavy rain and somewhat cooler temperatures during the day, although nights remain warm.

Climate data for Mae Sot (1991–2020, extremes 1951-present)
Month	Jan	Feb	Mar	Apr	May	Jun	Jul	Aug	Sep	Oct	Nov	Dec	Year
Record high °C (°F)	35.4 (95.7)	38.7 (101.7)	40.3 (104.5)	41.5 (106.7)	41.6 (106.9)	36.6 (97.9)	35.6 (96.1)	35.4 (95.7)	35.8 (96.4)	38.7 (101.7)	36.5 (97.7)	35.7 (96.3)	41.6 (106.9)
Mean daily maximum °C (°F)	32.0 (89.6)	34.3 (93.7)	36.1 (97.0)	37.2 (99.0)	34.8 (94.6)	32.0 (89.6)	30.8 (87.4)	30.5 (86.9)	31.8 (89.2)	32.6 (90.7)	32.3 (90.1)	31.2 (88.2)	33.0 (91.3)
Daily mean °C (°F)	23.0 (73.4)	24.9 (76.8)	27.5 (81.5)	29.4 (84.9)	28.3 (82.9)	26.8 (80.2)	26.0 (78.8)	25.8 (78.4)	26.4 (79.5)	26.5 (79.7)	25.1 (77.2)	23.1 (73.6)	26.1 (78.9)
Mean daily minimum °C (°F)	16.0 (60.8)	17.1 (62.8)	20.2 (68.4)	23.3 (73.9)	24.2 (75.6)	23.9 (75.0)	23.4 (74.1)	23.2 (73.8)	23.4 (74.1)	22.5 (72.5)	19.6 (67.3)	16.6 (61.9)	21.1 (70.0)
Record low °C (°F)	4.8 (40.6)	8.5 (47.3)	11.8 (53.2)	17.6 (63.7)	19.5 (67.1)	21.5 (70.7)	20.9 (69.6)	20.6 (69.1)	19.3 (66.7)	15.3 (59.5)	8.4 (47.1)	4.5 (40.1)	4.5 (40.1)
Average precipitation mm (inches)	7.5 (0.30)	6.8 (0.27)	20.9 (0.82)	36.1 (1.42)	153.5 (6.04)	246.8 (9.72)	372.9 (14.68)	353.6 (13.92)	204.7 (8.06)	91.6 (3.61)	19.4 (0.76)	6.7 (0.26)	1,520.5 (59.86)
Average precipitation days (≥ 1.0 mm)	0.6	0.5	1.8	3.3	12.5	20.5	23.3	23.7	16.6	8.2	1.5	0.5	113
Average relative humidity (%)	70.7	63.3	60.9	63.2	74.8	83.3	85.7	86.7	84.4	80.9	75.3	72.9	75.2
Average dew point °C (°F)	16.6 (61.9)	16.4 (61.5)	18.3 (64.9)	20.9 (69.6)	23.0 (73.4)	23.5 (74.3)	23.3 (73.9)	23.3 (73.9)	23.4 (74.1)	22.6 (72.7)	19.9 (67.8)	17.3 (63.1)	20.7 (69.3)
Mean monthly sunshine hours	275.9	259.9	275.9	243.0	158.1	57.0	58.9	58.9	108.0	179.8	219.0	275.9	2,170.3
Mean daily sunshine hours	8.9	9.2	8.9	8.1	5.1	1.9	1.9	1.9	3.6	5.8	7.3	8.9	6.0
Source 1: World Meteorological Organization
Source 2: Office of Water Management and Hydrology, Royal Irrigation Department (sun 1981–2010)(extremes)

== Transportation ==
Mae Sot Airport (IATA: MAQ, ICAO: VTPM) serves domestic flights. In 2024, the airport was used to transport Myanmar military officials and families back to Myanmar. As of March 2025, Mae Sot airport only serves flights to and from Bangkok.

Mae Sot bus station is located adjacent to the airport.
