= Thai–Myanmar Friendship Bridge =

Thai–Myanmar Friendship Bridge สะพานมิตรภาพไทย-เมียนมา မြန်မာ-ထိုင်း ချစ်ကြည်ရေး တံတား
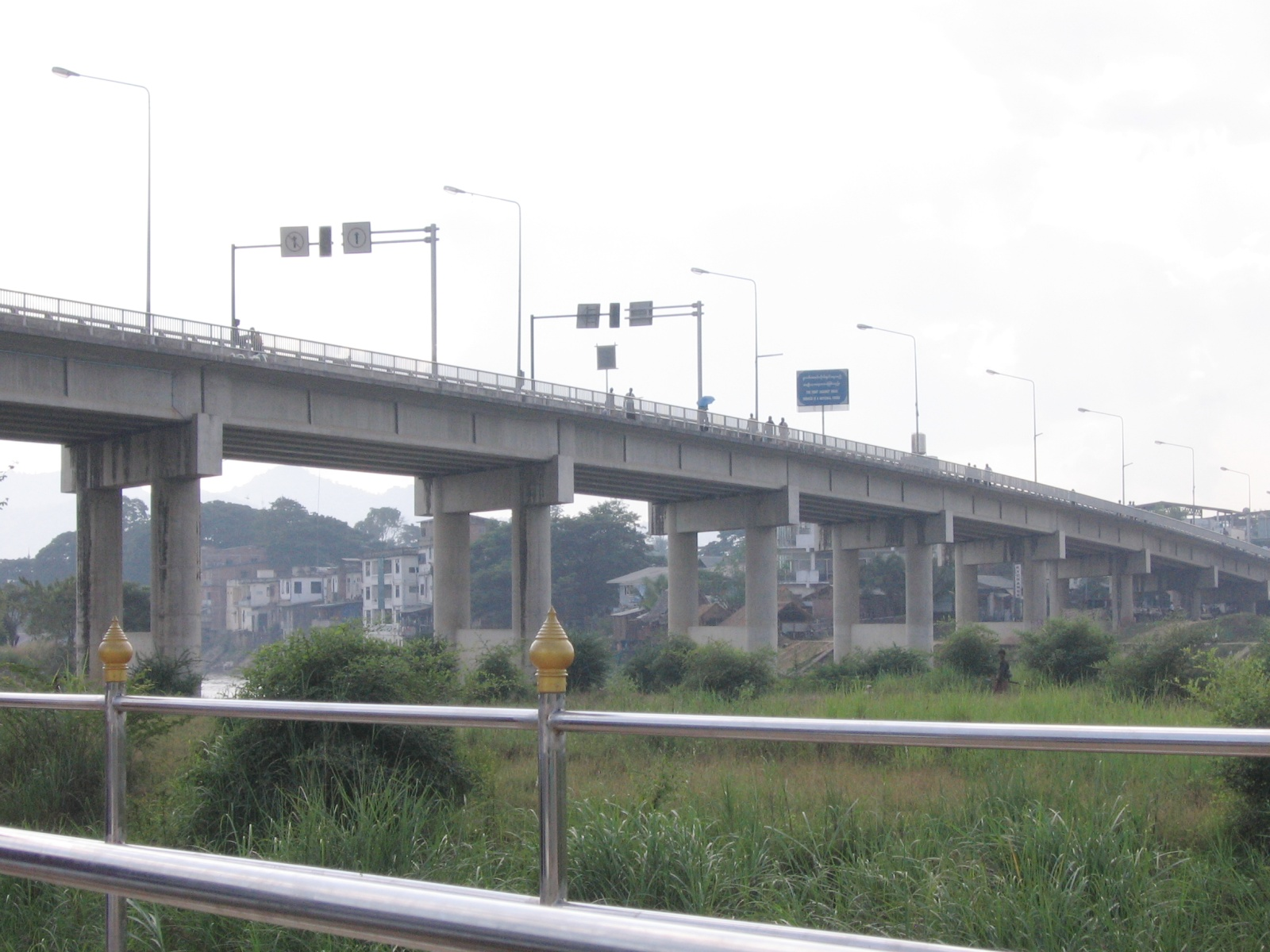
- Coordinates: 16°41′27″N 98°31′00″E
- Carries: Motor vehicles, Pedestrians
- Crosses: Moei River, Myanmar–Thailand border
- Locale: Mae Sot, Tak Province; Myawaddy, Kayin State

Characteristics
- Total length: 420 m (1,380 ft)
- Width: 13 m (42 ft 8 in)

History
- Opened: 15 August 1997

Location
- Interactive map of Thai–Myanmar Friendship Bridge

The Thai–Myanmar Friendship Bridge is a bridge over the Moei river, which connects the city of Mae Sot in Tak Province in Thailand with the city of Myawaddy in Kayin State in Myanmar. This international bridge is 420 m (1,380 ft) long and 13 m (42 ft 8 in) wide. The bridge forms an important link on Asian Highway 1 of Asian Highway Network. Another bridge to the north of the first, called the Second Thai–Myanmar Friendship Bridge was opened in 2019, and serves as another connection between Mae Sot and Myawaddy. The bridges are part of the East-West Economic Corridor connecting Myanmar, Thailand, Laos, and Vietnam.

== Location ==
The First and Second Friendship Bridges are located over the Moei River, connecting Tak Province, Thailand with Kayin State, Myanmar. The first bridge is also the terminus for Thai Highway 12. The second bridge is located a bit north of the first in Tambon Tha Sai Luad, and does not connect Mae Sot proper with Myawaddy proper. On the Thai side, it is part of Highway 130 and diverges off from Highway 12 before Mae Sot. It eventually reconnects with the Asian Highway 1 on the Myanmar side.

== History ==
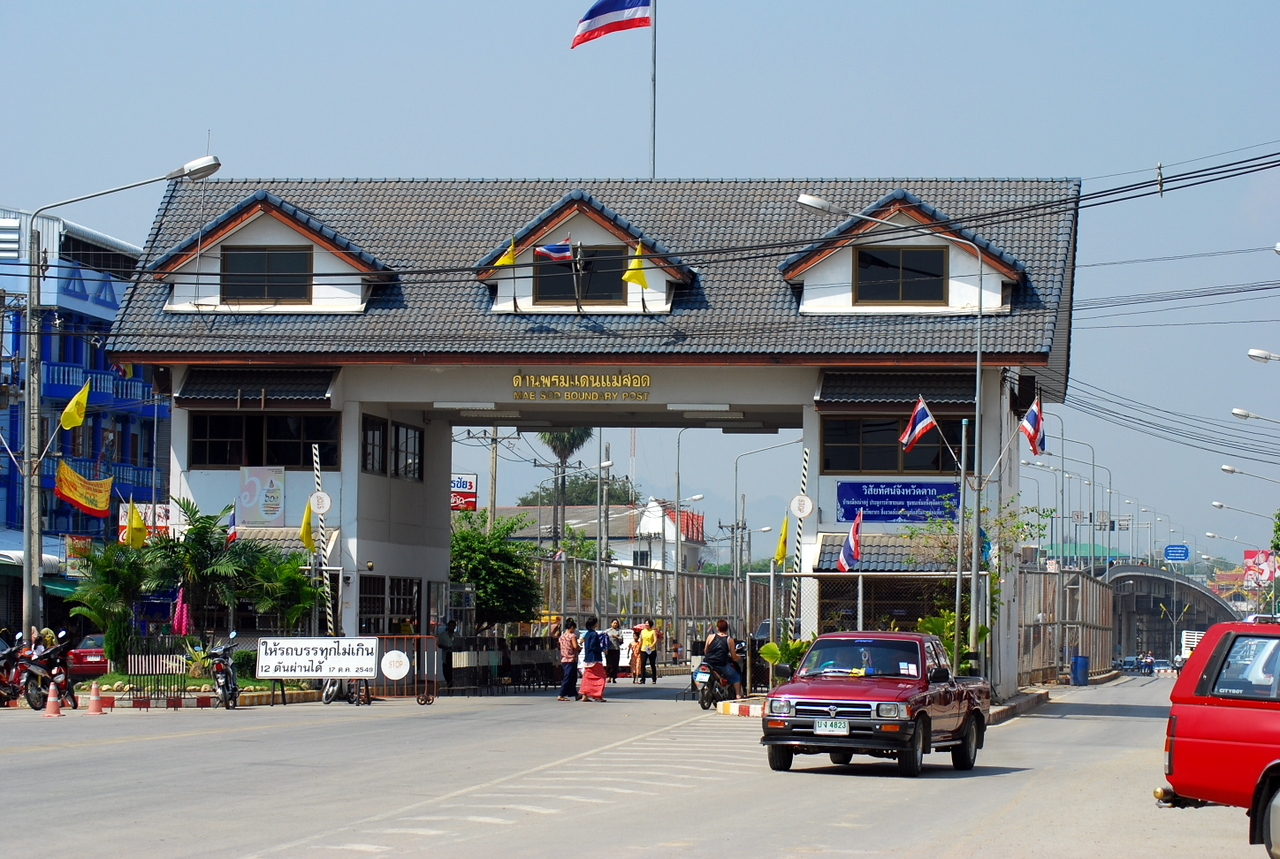
Checkpoint on the Thai side

The Thai–Myanmar Friendship Bridge was opened on 15 August 1997. It was the first bridge between Thailand and Myanmar. On 15 August 2017, Thailand and Myanmar celebrated the 20th anniversary of the bridge's opening. The deputy governor of Tak Province and Myawaddy governor attended the ceremony.

Work on the Second Thai-Myanmar Friendship bridge began 21 January 2015. According to The Nation, it was supposed to have been opened in December 2017 but was delayed by slow progress on the Myanmar side. Land owners in Myanmar had been resisting land expropriations required to construct a four kilometre road connecting the bridge with the Asian Highway 1, due to the offers by the Myanmar government being below the market price. On 20 March 2019, the second bridge was opened in an opening ceremony attended by the State Counsellor of Myanmar, Aung San Suu Kyi, and the Prime Minister of Thailand, Prayut Chan-o-cha. The second bridge cost around ฿4 billion.

=== Closure and reopening ===
The bridges were closed for three years due to both countries taking measures to prevent the spread COVID-19. The closure began on 23 March 2020 with the closure of border checkpoints on both sides. Cross-border cargo trade over the second bridge resumed on 27 October 2020, with COVID precautions. The decision came from the governor of Tak province, Pongrat Piromrat, after health authorities in Mae Sot said that they were confident COVID-19 had been brought under control in the area.

Plans to reopen the bridge were first announced on 1 May 2022, with the border checkpoints on the Thai side being cleaned up in preparations for reopening. The reopening was then delayed, and eventually reopened on 12 January 2023. However, it was forced to close again on 26 March 2023 due to fighting between the Tatmadaw and Kareni members of the People's Defence Force.

In April 2024, following multiple battles in the region, the border was closed for people wanting to leave Myanmar, while entering Myanmar was still possible.

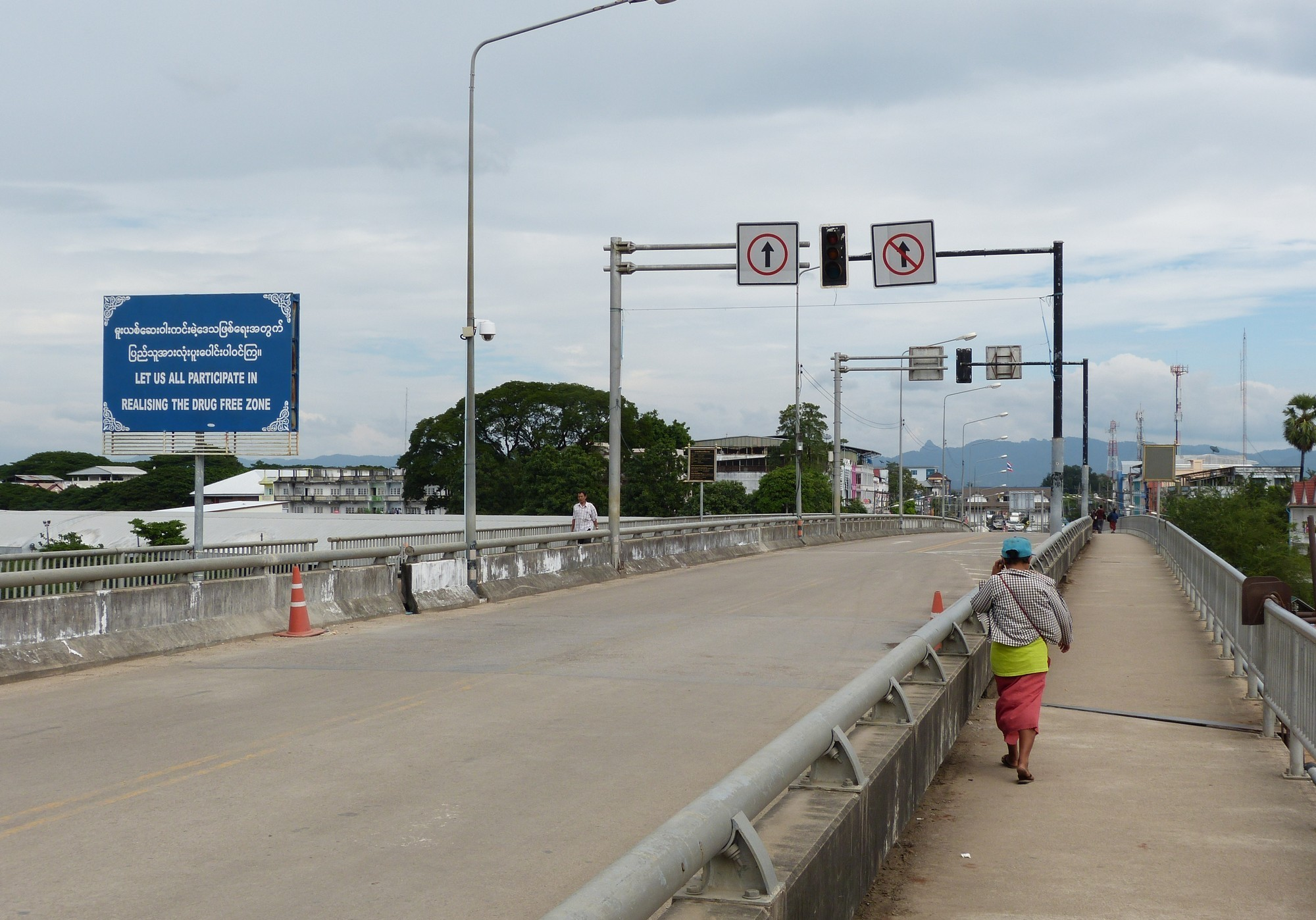
On top of the Friendship Bridge

=== Cross-border tensions ===
During the COVID-19 closure, Myawaddy came under siege due to the ongoing civil war in Myanmar, which would later lead to several incidents involving the bridges. On 11 March 2022, insurgents groups bombed the Second Friendship Bridge, resulting in a drop of cargo trucks travelling across the Myanmar–Thailand border. A temporary bridge was constructed on 16 March to supplement the Second Bridge, but was limited to vehicles below 50 tonnes.

On 24 April 2022, a car bomb exploded at the foot of the First Friendship Bridge on the Myanmar side. The bomb had been planted by insurgent forces, and cut the power supply to the area around the bridge on the Myanmar side. Myanmar officials and the Border Guard Forces then clashed with an insurgent group at the explosion site for 15 minutes. On 15 October 2022, Another bomb exploded near the First Friendship Bridge, at a border checkpoint .

On 29 May 2023, the military junta of Myanmar made a request to Thailand's Provincial Electricity Authority (PEA), requesting that they stop supplying power to the border towns of Shwe Kokko and Lay Kay Kaw. Both towns had heavy Chinese investments, and contracts between Shwe Myint Thaung Yinn (SMTY) Industry and Manufacturing Co. Ltd and PEA kept them supplied with electricity. The contract was set to expire on 28 February, but SMTY had requested a temporary renewal. The PEA followed Myanmar's request, and cut power on 6 June.

The border region on Myanmar's side was controlled by the Kareni warlord Chit Tu and his Kareni Border Guard Forces, who were at the time both allied with the military junta. Chit Tu subsequently threatened to close both friendship bridges. Prayut Chan-o-cha, who was both the Thai Prime-Minister and Minister of Defence, responded to the situation by saying “It is an internal matter of Myanmar and does not have any impact on the Thai people”.

In early 2024, forces of the Karen National Liberation Army, Karen National Union (KNU), and the People's Defence Force began to engage junta forces around Myawaddy. On April 10, the KNU claimed to have captured the city and push junta soldiers out towards the Second Friendship Bridge. Throughout April, junta forces retained the area around the bridge, with Karen forces engaging junta soldiers who were hiding near the Second Friendship Bridge on April 20. As a result of the unrest, around 3,000 civilians fled to the Thai side, with some many through via the bridges. By April 24, Myawaddy was recaptured by junta forces. Renewed fighting at the end of April caused the Second Friendship bridge to be closed between April 20 and April 30. The First Friendship Bridge was also temporarily closed before being reopened on April 27.

== See also ==
- List of bridges in Thailand
- List of international bridges
