= Tha Song Yang district =

Tha Song Yang ท่าสองยาง
- District
- Mae Moei National Park

- District location in Tak province
- Coordinates: 17°13′36″N 98°13′30″E
- Country: Thailand
- Province: Tak
- Seat: Mae Tan

Area
  - Total: 1,920.38 km^{2} (741.46 sq mi)

Population (2005)
  - Total: 61,161
  - Density: 31.8/km^{2} (82/sq mi)
- Time zone: UTC+7 (ICT)
- Postal code: 63150
- Geocode: 6305

Tha Song Yang (Thai: ท่าสองยาง, pronounced [tʰâː sɔ̌ːŋ jāːŋ]) is the northwesternmost district (amphoe) of Tak province, western Thailand.

== History ==
Tha Song Yang was a minor district (king amphoe) of Mae Sariang district, Mae Hong Son province. It was called Ban Mae Moei or Ban Mae Tawo (บ้านแม่เมย or บ้านแม่ตะวอ). The district office was at Tambon Tha Song Yang.

In 1948 the government moved Tha Song Yang to be a subordinate of Mae Sot District, Tak Province. The following year the district office was moved to Tambon Mae Tan. In 1958 it was upgraded to a full district.

== Etymology ==
Tha Song Yang means 'a river pier that has two Yang trees' (Dipterocarpus sp.). The name originates from the old location of the district office, where it had two Yang trees on both of the Moei River, one tree on the Burmese side and one on the Thai side.

== Geography ==
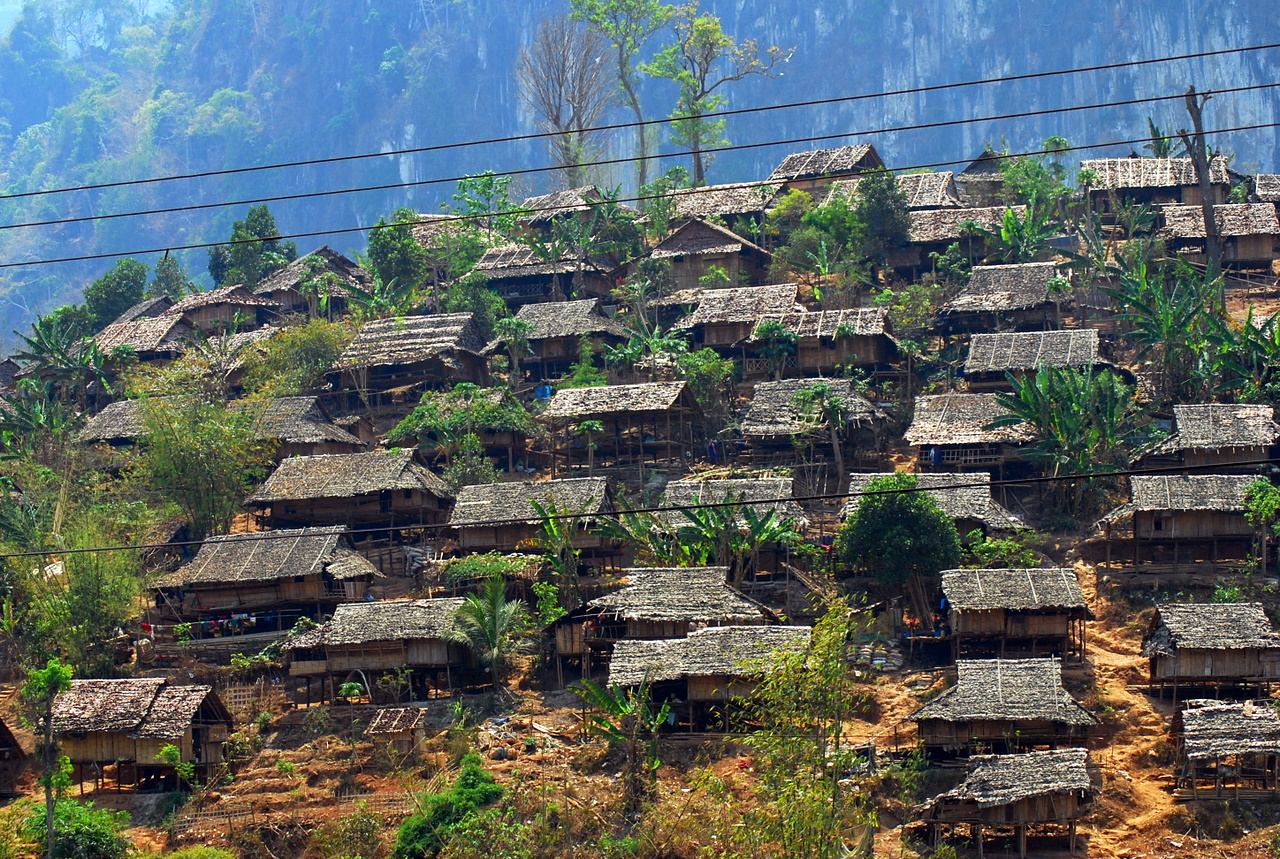
A section of Mae La refugee camp which houses an estimated 40,000 Karen people who have fled Burma

Neighboring districts are (Northwest from clockwise): Sop Moei of Mae Hong Son province, Omkoi of Chiang Mai province and Mae Ramat of Tak province. The other side of the Moei River is Kayin State of Myanmar.

Mae Moei National Park is in Tha Song Yang.

The important river of the district is the Moei River.

== Administration ==
The district is divided into six sub-districts (tambons), which are further subdivided into 56 villages (mubans). Mae Tan is a township (thesaban tambon) which covers parts of the tambon Mae Tan. There are a further six tambon administrative organizations (TAO).

No.	Name	Thai name	Villages	Pop.
1.	Tha Song Yang	ท่าสองยาง	9	9,075
2.	Mae Tan	แม่ต้าน	10	10,159
3.	Mae Song	แม่สอง	16	13,835
4.	Mae La	แม่หละ	12	8,207
5.	Mae Wa Luang	แม่วะหลวง	9	6,643
6.	Mae U-su	แม่อุสุ	10	13,242
