= Mawdaung =

Mawdaung မောတောင်မြို့
- Town
- Maw Taung
- Interactive map of Mawdaung
- Coordinates: 11.795°N 99.628°E
- Country: Myanmar
- Region: Tanintharyi Region
- District: Myeik District
- Township: Tanintharyi Township
- Town Status: 4 April 2017

Area
  - Total: 7.7 km^{2} (2.99 sq mi)
- Elevation: 218 m (715 ft)

Population (2019)
  - Total: 5,109
  - Density: 660/km^{2} (1,710/sq mi)
- Time zone: UTC+6.30 (MMT)

Mawdaung or Mawtaung (Burmese: မောတောင်) is a town in Tanintharyi Township in southeastern Tanintharyi Region. It is the easternmost point of Tanintharyi Region. The town sits on the National Highway 2, which branches out from the Yangon-Myeik Highway to pass through the Tenasserim Hills using the Singkhon Pass to the Myanmar–Thailand border.

== Geography and Demographics ==
Mawdaung is located 118 miles from Myeik in eastern Myeik District and the secondary town within Tanintharyi Township. It is located on the easternmost point of Tanintharyi Region on the Myanmar–Thailand border. The town has a total area of 2.99 square miles and is divided into 3 urban wards. In 2019, the town had a total population of 5107 people living in 867 households.

To the town's east is the Thai village of Singkhon and Mueang Prachuap Khiri Khan district, the narrowest point of Thailand. It is about 15 miles from Phet Kasem Road, Thailand's Highway 4.

== History and Economy ==
The border trade post in the village of Mawdaung was opened in 2013. The village of Mawdaung was elevated from to town status by Legal Notification 441/2017 on 4 April 2017.

In 2019, the road through the Singkhon Pass was completed. The connection made Bangkok a day trip from Myeik, and had high expectations for economic impact. Exporting goods from the Myeik-Tanintharyi area to Thailand's Ranong takes 276 miles by sea, taking about 23 hours in transport. From Myeik to Samut Sakhon, Thailand's largest fish market, it would take 31 hours in sea transport. Through Mawdaung and the Singkhon Pass, the travel time is reduced to only 7 hours. Mawdaung's economic importance to the region comes from this travel connection.

After the outbreak of the 2021 Myanmar civil war, the border trade was limited to dry goods and frozen seafood, with immigration restricted by Thailand. Because of the geopolitical situation, Thailand only has temporary border processing on their side of the border, rather than a permanent customs facility. This has also limited goals for Mawdaung to be a tourist route, accessing Hua Hin, a popular beach town.

On 14 November 2025, a coalition of rebel forces that included the Karen National Liberation Army (KNLA) and People's Defence Force) captures the town of Mawtaung in Myeik District, Tanintharyi Region. 19 Tatmadaw soldiers fled to Thailand according to pro-military sources. The Karen National Union, the KNLA's governing body, took control of the town. In April 2026, after the 2026 Myanmar presidential election, Thailand reopened their side of the border, although the Karen National Union still controlled Mawdaung and kept the border closed. On 19 May 2026, the Tatmadaw recaptured the town of from KNLA and PDF forces, after a long counteroffensive.
