= Mae La refugee camp =

Mae La แม่หละ မဲၢ်လးဒဲကဝီၤ
- Refugee camp
- Location within Thailand
- Coordinates: 17°07′44″N 98°22′50″E
- Country: Thailand
- Provinces: Tak Province
- Amphoe: Tha Song Yang District

Area
  - Total: 2.4 km^{2} (0.93 sq mi)

Population
  - Total: 46,133
  - Density: 19,000/km^{2} (50,000/sq mi)
- Time zone: UTC+7 (ICT)

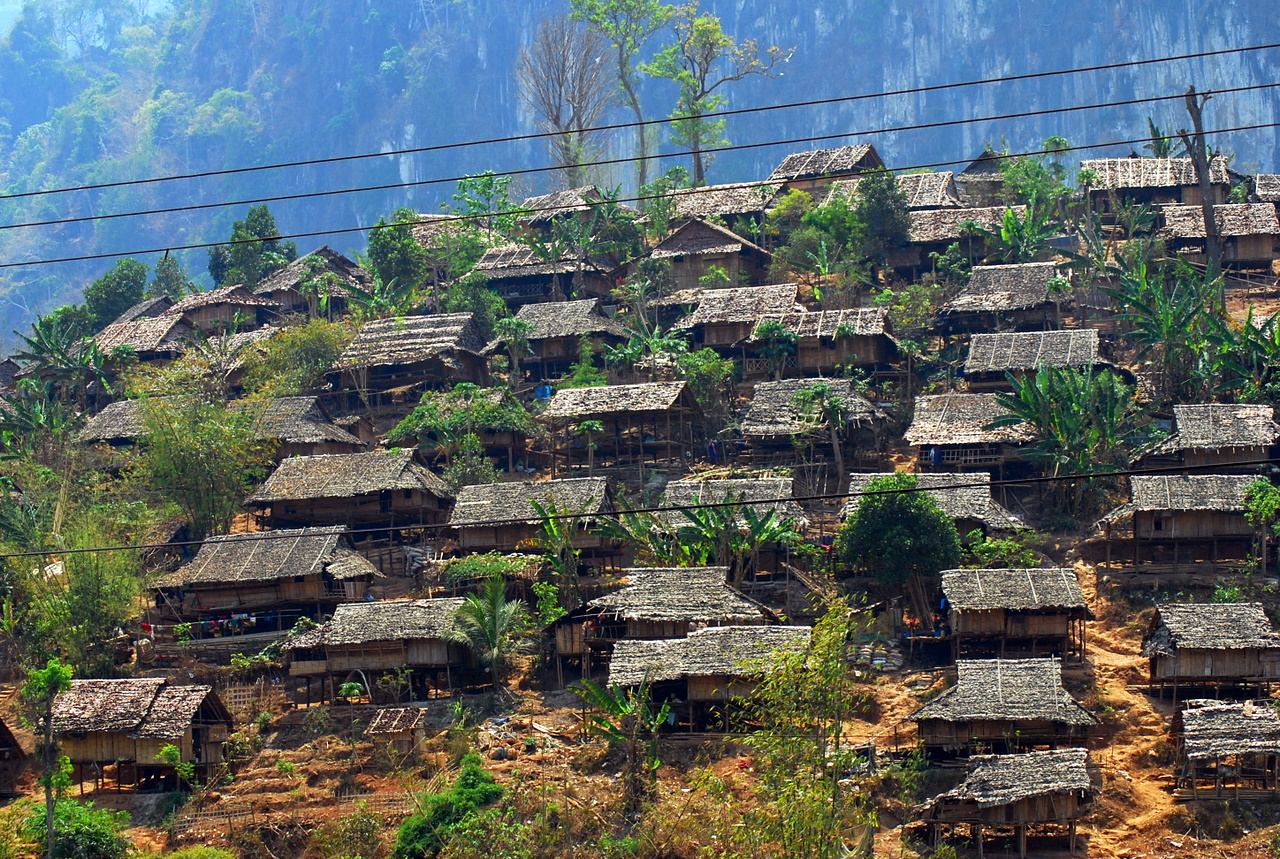
Mae La camp in Tak Province, Thailand, is one of the largest of nine UNHCR camps in Thailand where over 700,000 Refugees, Asylum-seekers, and stateless persons have fled.

Mae La, alternatively spelled Maela (Thai: แม่หละ), or Beh Klaw (S'gaw Karen: မဲၣ်လးဒဲကဝီၤ, ဘဲကျီး), is a refugee camp in Thailand. It was established in 1984 in Tha Song Yang District, Tak Province in the Dawna Range area and houses 50,000 Karen refugees; the number continues to rise as of June 2019. Mae La is the largest refugee camp for Karen refugees in Thailand. Over 90% are the persecuted ethnic Karen. The camps are overseen and run by the Thailand Burma Border Consortium (TBBC), a union of 11 international non-governmental organizations that provide food, shelter and non food items to the Burmese refugees and displaced people.

The first refugees arrived in 1984, mostly of the Karen or Karenni ethnicities, fleeing armed conflict and ethnic persecution by the Burmese government. Thousands of villages, especially in the Karen and Karenni States, were razed and burned during the conflict. Many refugees cited similar stories: direct military attacks by the Myanmar army, forced labor, destruction of homes and food crops, and enslavement. The camp was originally established following the fall of the Karen National Union (KNU) base at the Thai village of Mae La on the border, and had a population of 1,100 people.

Until 1995, refugees on the Thailand-Burma border lived in village-type settlements and were allowed to travel outside the camps to get food and shelter materials. However, due to attacks by the Democratic Karen Buddhist Army (DKBA), it was moved to the site where Zone C currently lies. After the fall of Manerplaw in January 1995, a number of camps were attacked in cross-border raids and the Thai authorities began to consolidate camps to improve security; Mae La was designated as the main consolidation camp in the area.

In April 1995, Mae La increased in size from 6,969 to 13,195 due to the closure of five camps to the north – Mae Ta Waw, Mae Salit, Mae Plu So, Kler Kho and Kamaw Lay Kho – and the move of Huay Heng later in October of the same year. Over the following year, the camp doubled in size again to 26,629 as those lost in the move came back into the camp.

In March 1997, some people were relocated here following the closure of Huai Bone camp (a.k.a. Don Pa Kiang) and again in February 1998 when Shoklo camp was closed.

The camp was attacked in 1997 by DKBA troops with support from Burma Army units. There have been no incursions since then, but a mortar shell landed in Section A5 in March 1998. During the dry season, this area is quite tense with concerns relating to camp security, with threats of armed attack and/or attempts to burn the camp.

The area of Karen State lying opposite Mae La camp is mostly rural, with no large settlements or infrastructure. The Karen National Liberation Army (KNLA) maintains its 7th Brigade Headquarters nearby, and there are several Burma Army and Democratic Karen Buddhist Army outposts in the area (the DKBA is a faction of the KNLA which split off and aligned itself with the Burma Army in 1994).

Mae La is considered an educational centre for refugees, so the current population includes several thousand students who come to study in the camp (some from other camps but mostly from Burma). They are registered only as temporary inhabitants. In total, as of July 2014 there were 2,763 students boarding in the camps. However, there are only a handful of schools on the Thailand-Burma border where students can apply once they finish a post-ten level school, leaving thousands of aspiring university students unable to complete further education.

Thai authorities allowed refugees to register with the United Nations High Commissioner for Refugees (UNHCR) periodically during 2004 and 2005, and since 2005, all registered refugees have been eligible for resettlement to third countries. In June 2014, 96,206 had been resettled, with the vast majority (75%) of them headed to the United States, followed by Australia, Canada, Finland, and Norway. Resettlement numbers have declined each year since 2008, mainly because the majority of those who were able to register in 2004 and 2005 have already left. The group settlement program to the United States has now closed, but a significant number of those eligible for resettlement remained and were expected to depart in 2015.

== Documentary ==
Capital of Mae La is a documentary film about the Mae La refugee camp, the largest refugee camp of the nine along the Thai-Myanmar border. It was produced by Jiraporn Laocharoenwong of the Department of Sociology and Anthropology at Chulalongkorn University and Nuankhanit Phromchanya, the film's director. The film premiered in Amsterdam before being shown at the Bangkok Art and Culture Centre.

== Images ==
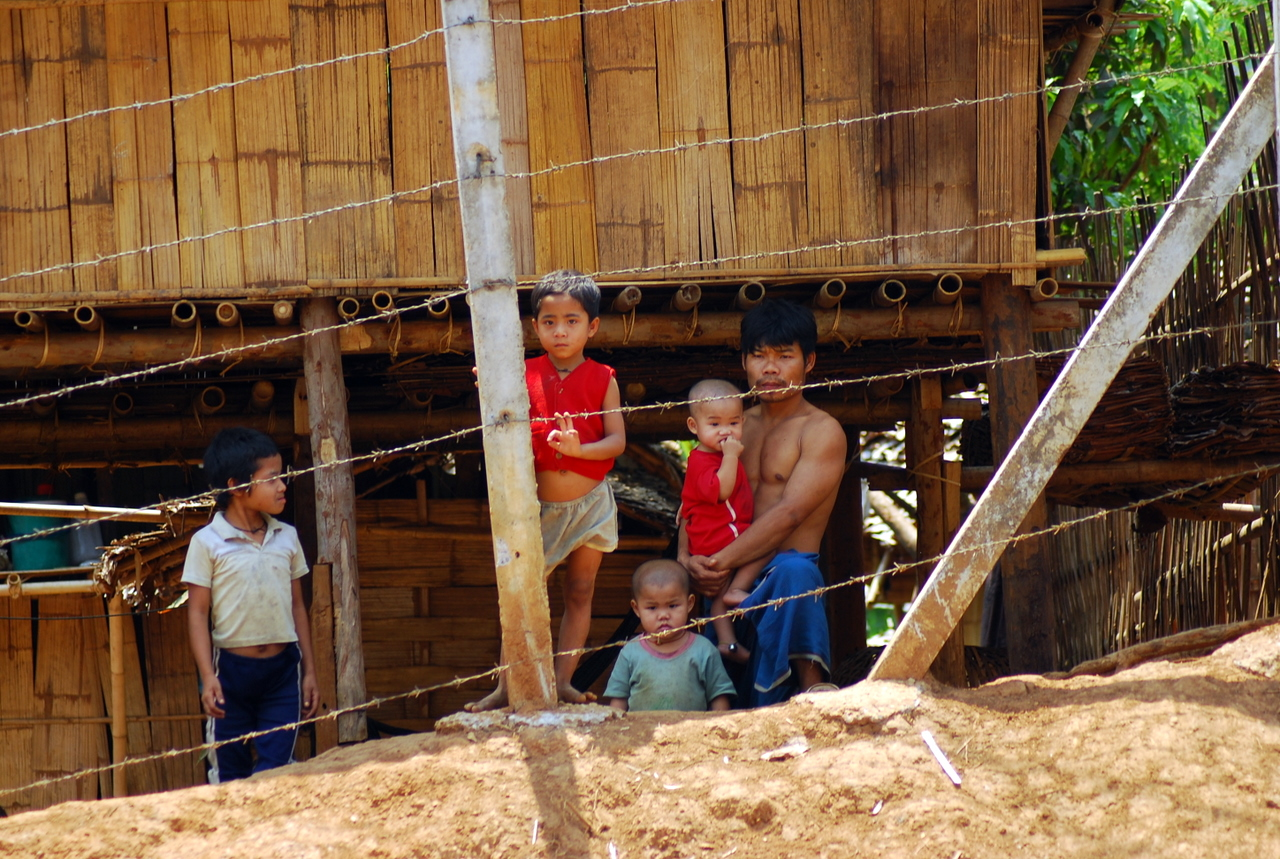
