= Myawaddy =

Township in Kayin State, Myanmar

Myawaddy မြဝတီ Myawadi
- Township
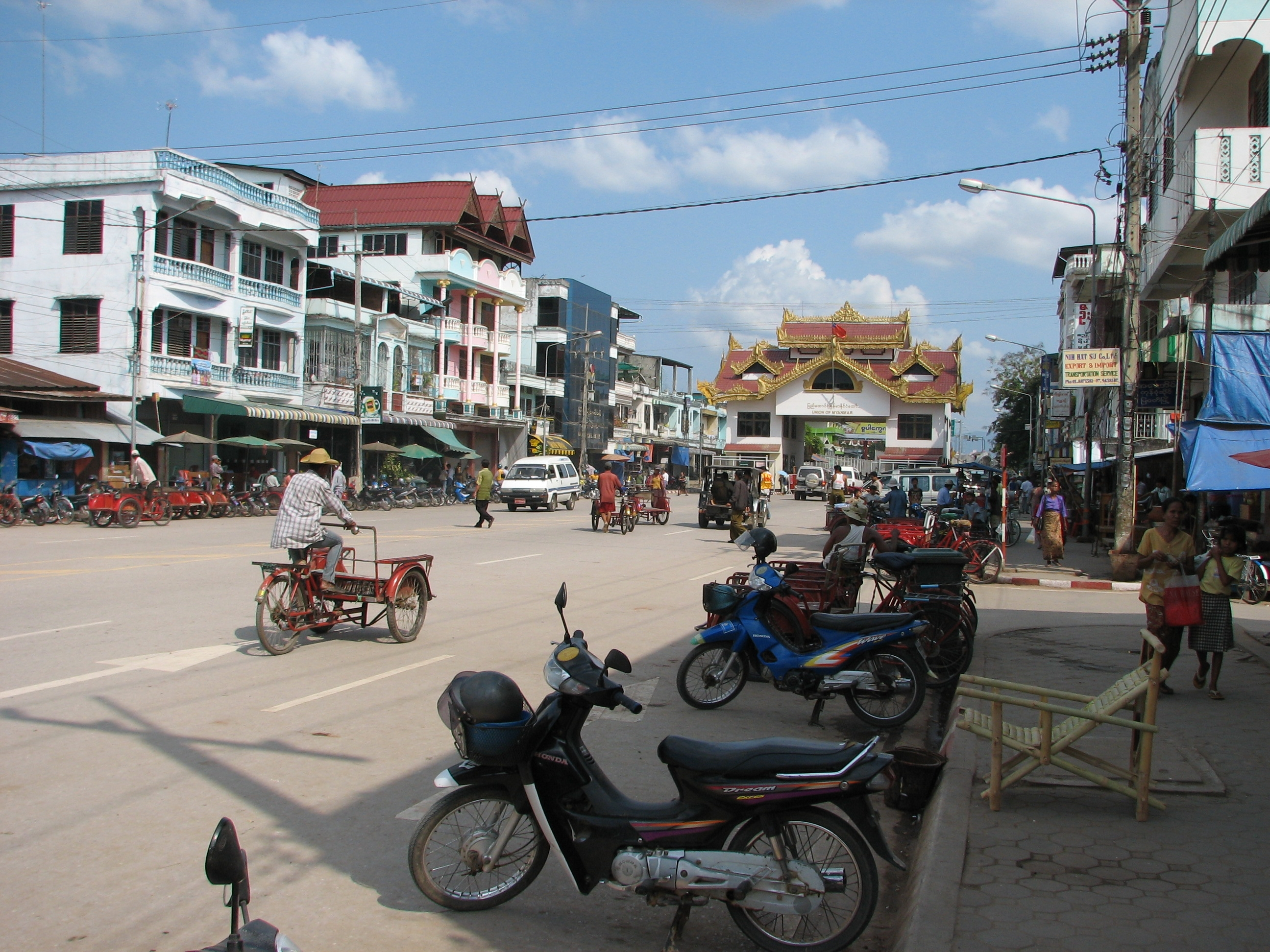
- Main Street looking east

- Location in Myanmar (Burma)
- Coordinates: 16°41′16″N 98°30′30″E
- Country: Myanmar
- Division: Kayin State
- District: Myawaddy
- Township: Myawaddy Township

Area
  - Township: 1.18 sq mi (3.1 km^{2})

Population (2019)
  - Urban: 55,638
  - Metro: 149,510
- Time zone: UTC+6.30 (MMT)

Myawaddy (Burmese: မြဝတီ; Thai: เมียวดี; RTGS: Mia-wadi; S'gaw Karen: ရၤမတံ; Pwo Eastern Karen: မေဝ်ပ္တီ; Mon: ဗြဝတဳ) is a town in southeastern Myanmar, in Kayin State, close to the border with Thailand. Separated from the Thai border town of Mae Sot by the Moei River (Thaungyin River), the town is the most important trading point between Myanmar and Thailand. Myawaddy is 170 kilometres (110 mi) east of Mawlamyine, the fourth largest city of Myanmar, and 426 kilometres (265 mi) northwest of Bangkok, the capital of Thailand.

== History ==
In 1997, the Thai–Myanmar Friendship Bridge opened across the Moei River connecting Myawaddy with Mae Sot. An additional border crossing, the second Thai-Myanmar Friendship Bridge, was opened in 2019 to the north west to handle goods traffic.

On 6 August 2010, a bomb exploded in the car park of a crowded market in Myawaddy, killing two men and seriously injuring four others.

On 5 April 2024, during the Myanmar civil war, a combined force of PDF and KNLA fighters captured major military bases on the outskirts of the city. Nearly 500 junta troops surrendered, leaving junta forces in Myawaddy isolated and under pressure. On 10 April 2024, remaining junta forces withdrew from Myawaddy and retreated to the Thai border. The KNLA subsequently took control of the entire township. Later reports indicate the KNLA never took the entire town.

On 24 April, the town was recaptured by Junta forces, after the KNLA was forced to withdraw, after a heavy firefight.

== Economy ==
Myawaddy is home to one of 7 official border trade posts with Thailand and opened on 16 September 1998. In 2022, total trade volume at the border post stood at US$1.872 billion, making it the second busiest trade port on the Thai-Burmese border after Htikhi.

The border-crossing is a major route for the export of Myanmar's gems, many of which have their claimed provenance changed once across the border. The India–Myanmar–Thailand Trilateral Highway connection to Myawaddy opened in August 2015.

== Tourism ==
Under an agreement between Thailand and Myanmar governments, travelers who cross the border from Myawaddy-Mae Sot Friendship bridge are allowed to stay in Mae Sot for seven days. The new agreement has been effective from October 2016.

== Crime ==
Since the mid-2010s, Myawaddy has been home to unregulated casinos, which remain illegal in Myanmar. In 2021, Myawaddy was home to at least 18 casinos.

The area around Myawaddy has attracted significant investments in the form of Chinese gambling development projects, with ties to triads and crime syndicates, including Yatai New City, established by She Zhijiang, a convicted Chinese businessman; Saixigang Industrial Zone, linked to Wan Kuok-koi, a former triad leader; and Huanya International New City. The nearby village of Shwe Kokko has become a major regional crime, human trafficking, and cyber scamming hub.

KK Park, located in the nearby village of Mawhtotalay, has also emerged as a centre for cyber scams, human trafficking, online gambling, prostitution, and drugs. Cyber-crime committed within the vicinity of Myawaddy includes pig butchering scams, which are run by Chinese crime gangs, which entrap people, predominantly ethnic Chinese and also other foreigners (predominantly other Southeast Asians), under false pretenses (like promising an easy job with high salary) and then force them under threat of torture to convince victims to send large amounts of money to them.

== Healthcare ==
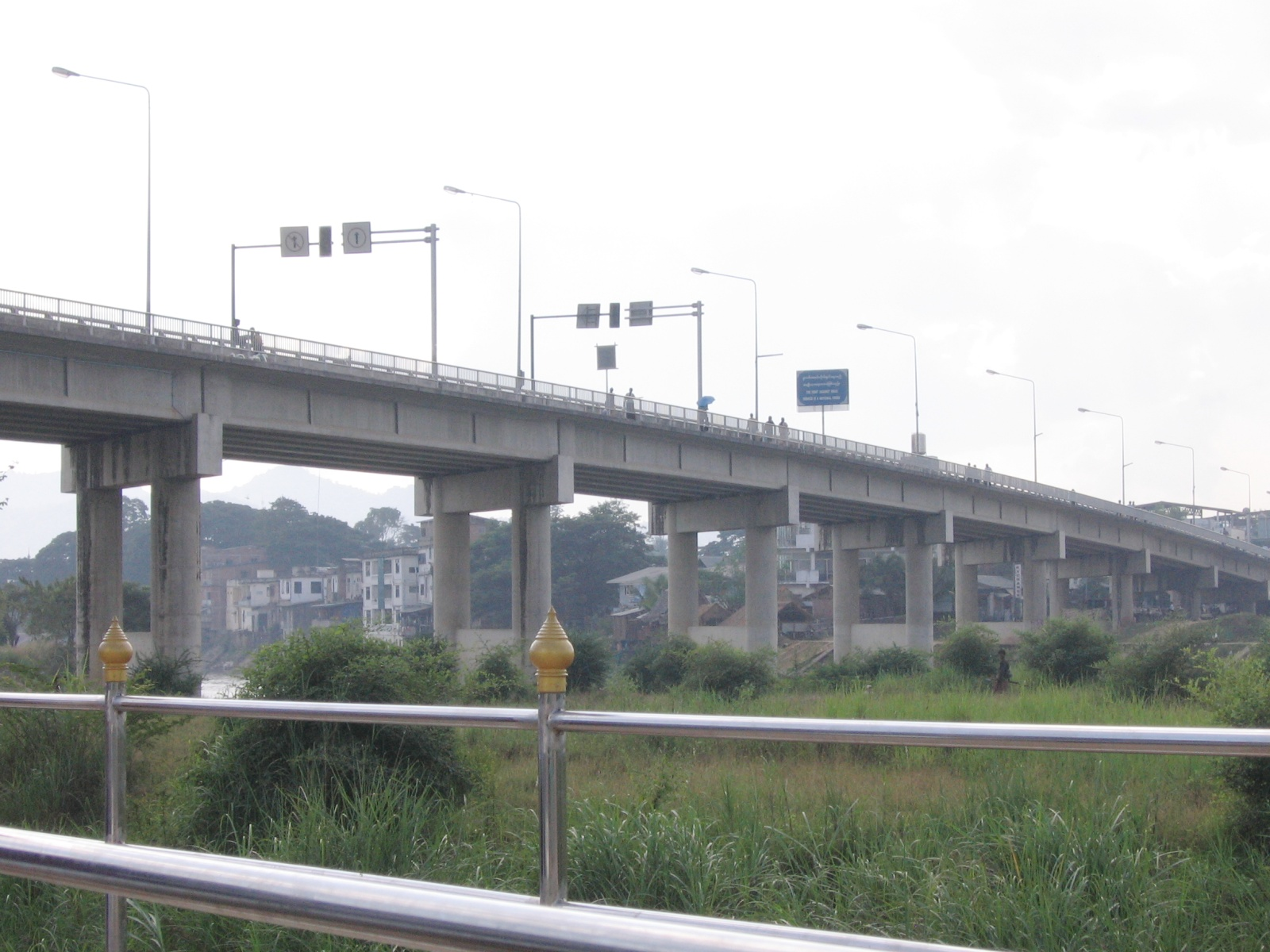
The Thai–Myanmar Friendship Bridge linking Myawaddy with Mae Sot in Thailand.

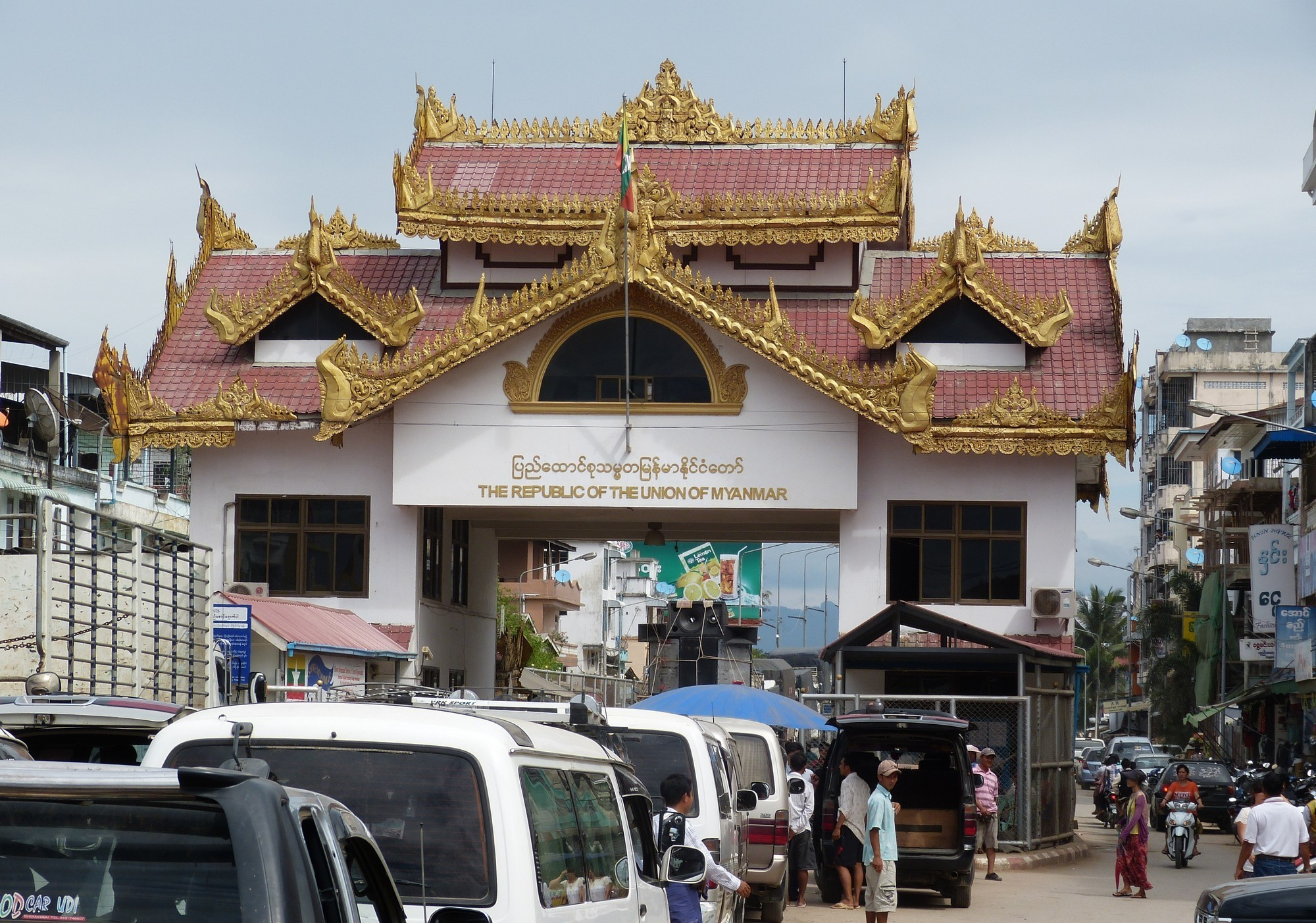
The border gate in Myawaddy

Myawaddy District Hospital is a public hospital that serves people in Myawaddy township and its surrounding area. Myawaddy Hospital's Operation Theater Building was constructed by the Japanese Government under the Japanese Government's Grant Assistance for Grassroots Human Security Projects (GGP). However, local people still cross the border to seek help at Dr Cynthia Maung's Mae Tao Charity Clinic in Mae Sot, Thailand, for better service.

== Demographics ==
In the 2014 Myanmar census, Myawaddy Township had 195,624 people. The town itself had 113,070 people, 57.8% of the township's population. In 2019, according to the General Administration Department, the population had dropped to 55,638 people in the town, with the township dropping overall to 149,510 people.

== Places of interest ==
Myawaddy is home to the Migyaunggon or Crocodile Temple, known for its crocodile-shaped library building. The town is also home to the Viewpoint Pagoda and Phra Mon Yoeun, a 20 m (66 feet) Mon-style Buddha image.

Myawaddy township is also home to the famous Mulae, Mulaet, and Mulaeh pagodas, where people across Myanmar and even Thailand come on pilgrimage. The pagoda are 2,000 meters above sea level and have a stunning view, but due to Covid-19 and the ongoing Burmese civil war, the visit to the pagoda has dropped significantly.

== See also ==
- Border Guard Forces
