= Moei River =

Moei River Thaungyin River
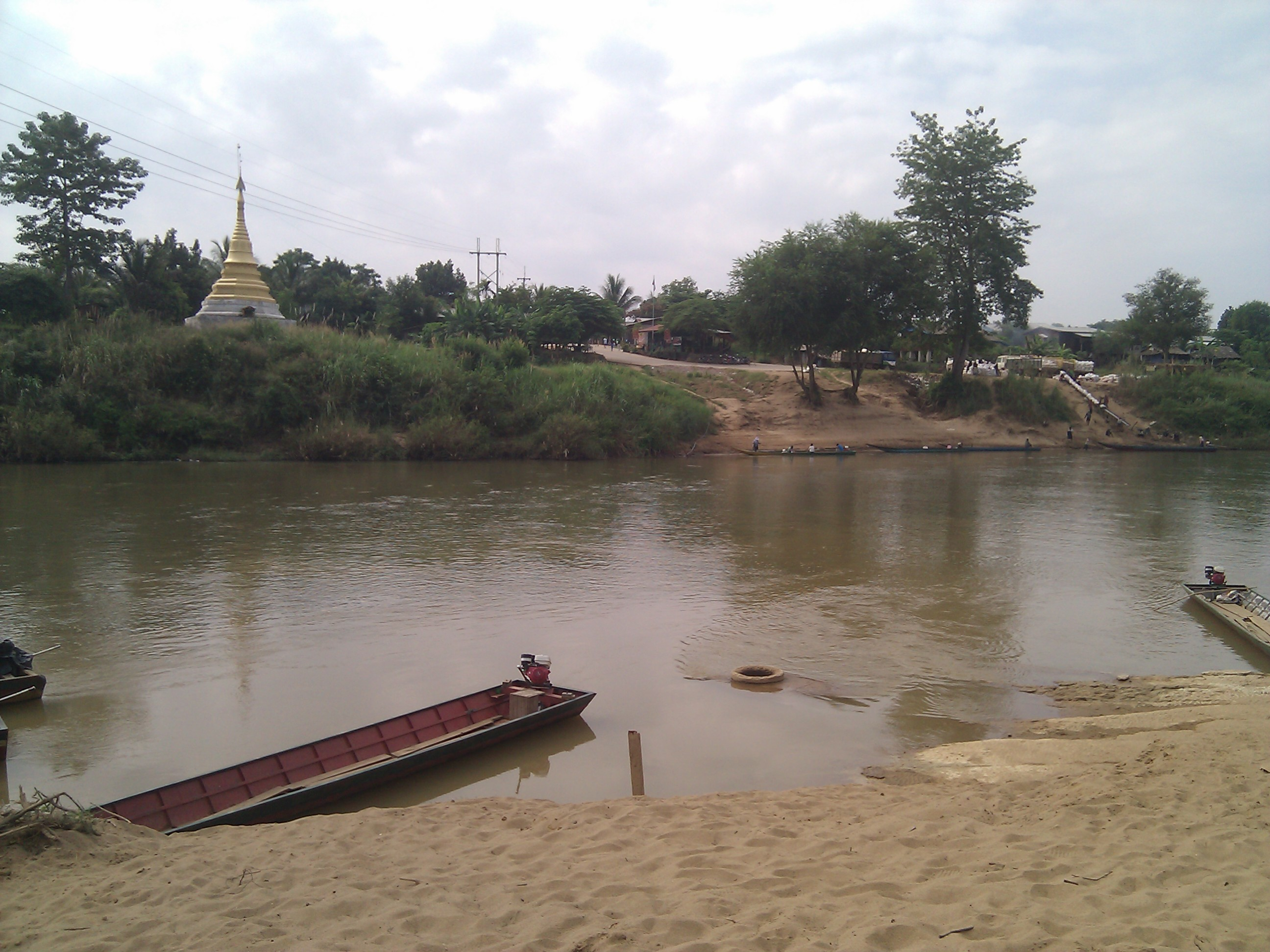
- Moei River from the Thai border looking at Myanmar
- Native name: แม่น้ำเมย (Thai); သောင်ရင်းမြစ် (Burmese)

Location
- Country: Thailand, Burma
- State: Tak Province, Mae Hong Son Province
- District: Phop Phra, Mae Sot, Mae Ramat, Tha Song Yang, Sop Moei
- City: Mae Sot

Physical characteristics
- Source
  - location: Thanon Thongchai Range, Tak Province, Thailand
  - coordinates: 16°29′5″N 98°51′25″E
- Mouth: Salween River
  - location: Sop Moei, Mae Hong Son Province, Thailand
  - coordinates: 17°47′9″N 97°44′33″E
  - elevation: 76 m (249 ft)
- Length: 327 km (203 mi)

Basin features
- Tributaries
  - right: Yuam River

The Moei River (Thai: แม่น้ำเมย, RTGS: Maenam Moei, IPA: [mɛ̂ːnáːm mɤːj]), also known as the Thaungyin River (Burmese: သောင်ရင်းမြစ်; S'gaw Karen: သူမွဲကျိ) Eastern Pwo Karen Phlone:ယှုံမွဲခၠေါဟ် a tributary of the Salween River. Unlike most rivers in Thailand, the Moei River flows north in a northwest direction. It originates in Phop Phra District, Tak Province, flowing then from south to north across Mae Sot, Mae Ramat, and Tha Song Yang Districts, finally entering the Salween River within the limits of Sop Moei District of Mae Hong Son Province. The river is 327 kilometres (203 mi) long.

The Yuam River joins its left bank only 7 kilometres (4 mi) before its confluence with the Salween. Many fish species inhabit its waters, including the giant river catfish.

== International border ==
The Moei River forms a portion of the border between Thailand and Myanmar.

The river is the scene of clashes between the Tatmadaw and Karen militias. Often Karen people cross the river either in order to enter Thailand as refugees or to go back to Burma.

Flow of refugees increased as fighting in Burma intensified in 2024.
