= Karen conflict =

Armed conflict in southeastern Myanmar

- Part of the Myanmar conflict
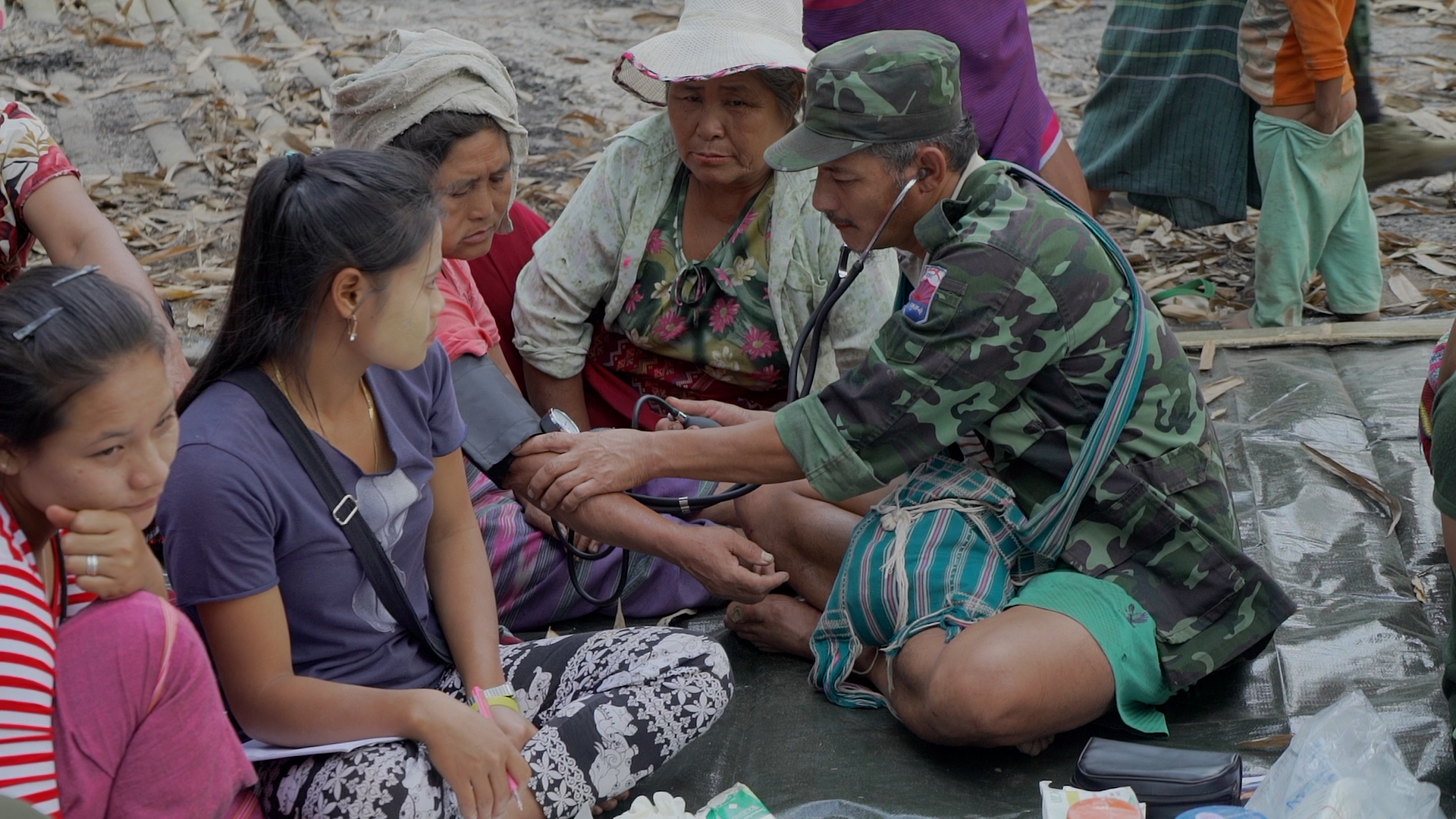
- A KNLA medic treats IDPs in Hpapun District, Kayin State.
Date	31 January 1949 – present (77 years, 9 months, 2 weeks and 2 days)
Location	Kayin State, Myanmar (primarily)
Status	Ongoing

Belligerents
Myanmar; Tatmadaw; Myanmar Army; Southeastern Command; Karen National Army; Former: Union of Burma (1948–1962); Socialist Republic of the Union of Burma (1962–1988); Union of Myanmar (1988–2011); Democratic Karen Buddhist Army (1994–2009); Karen Border Guard Force (2009–2024)	Karen National Union; Karen National Defence Organisation; Karen National Liberation Army; All Burma Students' Democratic Front: DKBA-5; KNU/KNLA Peace Council; Former: God's Army (1997–2006)

Commanders and leaders
Min Aung Hlaing; Soe Win; Mya Tun Oo; Saw Chit Thu; Win Myint (2018–2021); Aung San Suu Kyi (2016–2021); Htin Kyaw (2016–2018); Sein Win (2015–2021); Thein Sein (2011–2016); Wai Lwin (2011–2015); U Thuzana (1994–2010); Than Shwe (1992–2011); Saw Maung (1988–1992); San Yu (1981–1988); Ne Win (1962–1988); Win Maung (1957–1962); Ba U (1952–1957); U Nu (1948–1962); Sao Shwe Thaik (1948–1952)	Saw Mutu Say Poe (since 2008); Saw Tamlabaw (2000–2008); Bo Mya (1976–2000); Saw Ba U Gyi † (1949–1950); Saw Mo Shay; Bo Nat Khann Mway (1994–2016)

Strength
43,000 (1951) 30,000	4,000+ (1951) 6,000–7,000; 1,500

Casualties and losses
- Since 1989: 4,600+ killed 200,000 civilians displaced Total: 50,000+ killed

The Karen conflict is an armed conflict in Kayin State, Myanmar (formerly known as Karen State, Burma). It is part of the wider internal conflict in Myanmar between the military government and various minority groups. Karen nationalists have been fighting for an independent state, known as Kawthoolei, since 1949. The Karen National Union (KNU) and its Karen National Liberation Army (KNLA) are the most prominent Karen rebel groups. Hundreds of thousands of civilians have been displaced by the conflict, many of whom fled to neighbouring Thailand and survive in refugee camps.

Tensions between the Karen and the Bamar ethnic majority in Myanmar have existed since the British colonial era, based on the British 'direct and indirect rule' policy and Karen soldiers' roles in putting down Burmese rebellions in the late 19th century. Around the time of Burmese independence, the Karen National Defence Organisation (KNDO) was formed as an armed wing of the Karen National Union (KNU) to put down a communist rebellion. After the Burmese government settled for peace and allowed communists back into national politics, a series of tensions, escalations and battles led to the KNU formally declaring war on the Burmese government on 31 January 1949.

== Karen people ==
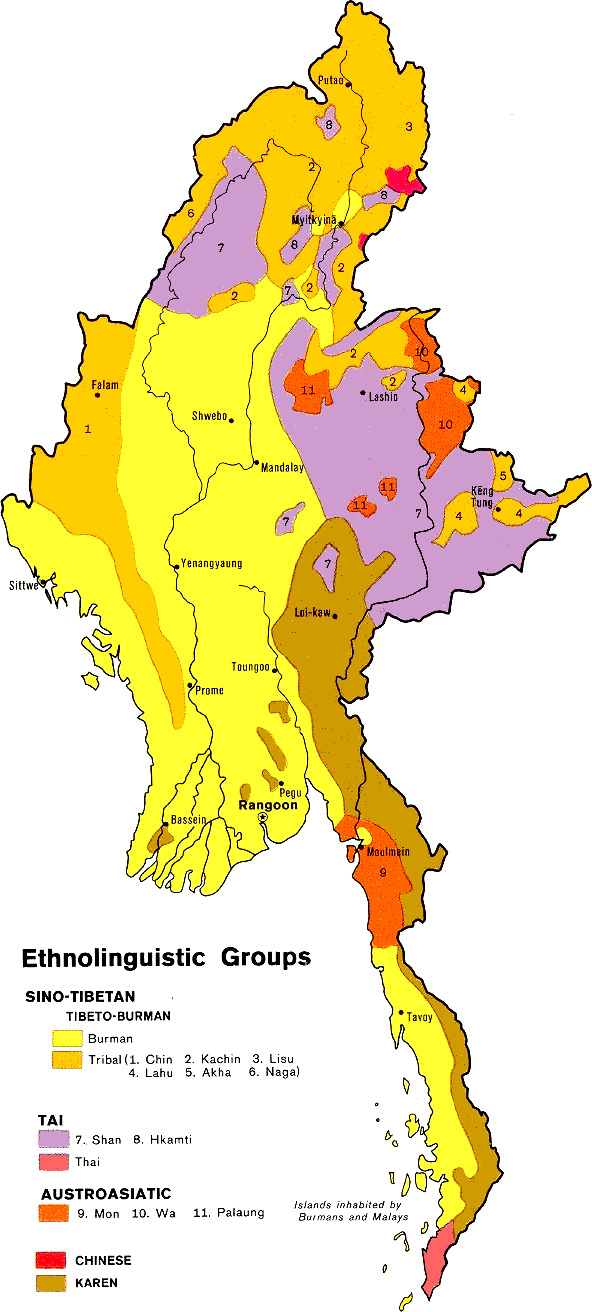
An ethno-linguistic map of Burma. The Karen live in the southern Irrawaddy river delta and along the border with Thailand

The Karen people are one of the largest ethnic minorities in Myanmar, with a population of 5 to 7 million. They speak around 20 different dialects, of which Sgaw and Pwo are the most common. Karen languages are among the Tibeto-Burman languages, which are a branch of the Sino-Tibetan languages.

Karen people began to arrive in what became Myanmar around 500 BC. They are believed to have come from the Mongolian region, traveling south through the Mekong Valley, the Irrawaddy Valley and the Salween Valley.

The Karen are not homogenous, and are religiously, linguistically, culturally, and geographically separated. The various groups do not share history within the kingdoms of pre-colonial Burma or the British empire. Some became ministers in urbanized kingdoms such as the 16th century Pegu kingdom. Others lived in the forests bordering Thailand (some still do). Around 20% are Christian, while 75% are Buddhist. A small percentage practice animism, and in the lowland river delta the so-called 'black Karen', a small minority, are Muslim. The mainly Buddhist Sgaw-speaking population constitutes around 80% of the total.

Speakers of Pwo Karen live in the plains of central and lower Myanmar and were assimilated into the dominant Mon social system. These 'Mon-Karen' or Talaing Kayin had a special status and were an essential part of Mon court life. The Bama Kayin (Sgaw) were either absorbed into Burmese society or pushed towards the mountains bordering Thailand in the east and Southeast by the Burman population. Karen living in the eastern hills named the Dawna Range and the Tenasserim Hills bordering Thailand developed a distinct society, history, and a subsistence lifestyle.

Today, about 2 million Karen live in the Irrawaddy river delta. They developed an urbanised society based on rice agriculture.

== Colonial era ==
The Karen conflict's roots were planted in the British colonial era. In the 19th century, certain Karen hill tribes were Christianized by American missionaries. During the 19th century conquest of Burma, the British made use of the hostility between Burmans and Karen. Karen assisted British armies in the Anglo-Burmese wars. During this era, American missionaries Christianized Sgaw Karen and helped them rise in Burmese society.

Christian Karen developed relationships with the British regime. Christian education taught the Karen how to speak, read, and write English. The British ended up 'Karenized'. Exclusion of Burmans from the army and other colonial bodies increased their resistance to the colonial state.

=== Conversion to Christianity ===
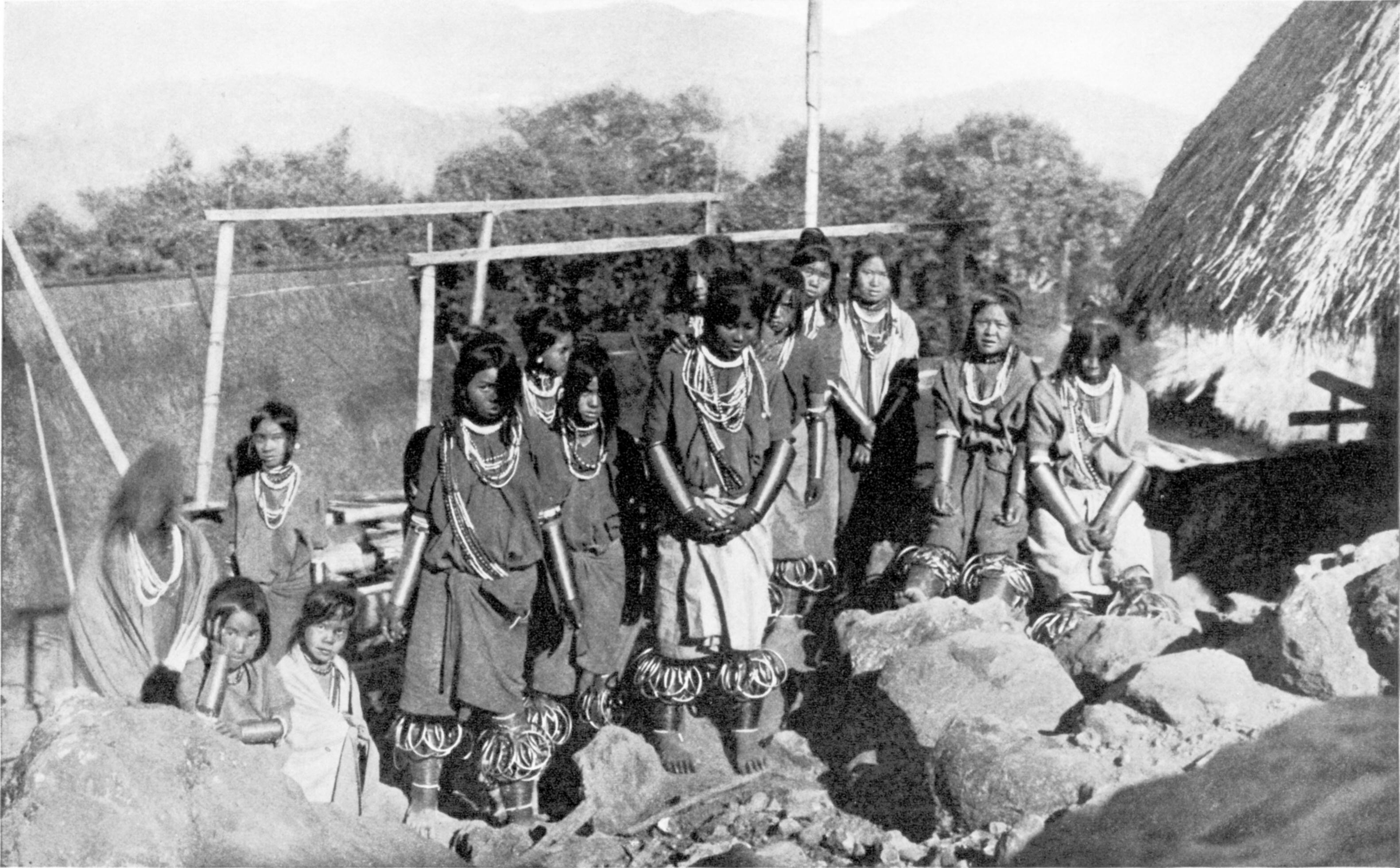
Women of the Karen Hills in 1922

The first American missionary arrived in 1813. On 16 May 1828, the first Karen was recorded converting to Christianity. American Baptists discovered that Sgaw Karen were easier to convert than Pwo, as Pwo Karen had only recently converted to Buddhism before the missionaries' arrival.

The acceptance of Christianity by Sgaw Karen provided a way to distinguish themselves from Burman Buddhists. To convert more Karen, the missionaries learned their language and developed a Burmese alphabet transcription for the Karen languages. Jonathan Wade was involved in producing dictionaries and establishing grammar rules for the Pwo and Sgaw Karen dialects. In 1853, Francis Mason published the first Bible in the Sgaw Karen Language. A Pwo Karen Bible was published by D. L Brayton.

Between 1860 and 1890, many Karen converted to Christianity. In 1875, a Baptist college opened in Rangoon, later known as Karen College. Schools were built and the Christian Karen learned English. They used this to improve their economic, educational and social situation.In 1922, H. Marshall wrote:

A considerable number of Karen young men and women are college graduates and are leading successful lives in various communities, as may be seen by looking over the list of officers in government positions in the Education, Forest, Police, Military and subordinate branches.

— Reverend H. Marshall,

The growth in literacy among Sgaw Karen led to secular Karen literature and journals. In 1842, the Baptist Mission began to publish a Sgaw Karen monthly magazine called The Morning Star (Hsa Tu Gaw) that continued until its takeover by General Ne Win in 1962. The missionaries taught them group pride and dignity, helping to forge a Karen consciousness.

The missionaries focused on the hill tribes. The relationship that developed between the British and these groups stemmed from the Karen position in Burmese history. Never before had these groups gained political or economic influence. Aligning with the British presented an opportunity to improve their lives. At some point, the "thirst for Christian education", as written by a missionary, was so big that the "Eastern Karen" demanded a permanent teacher.

The relationship between Karen and British created resentment among the Burman population. The Burmese state pushed Karen towards the British. Britain did not control the whole of Burma before 1886. In Burman-controlled territory Karen were not allowed to study at Baptist schools. Many were tortured/killed. Karen who allied to the British helped them cement their control of Burma in 1886.

Literacy, English, and Christianity gave the Sgaw Karen an advantage over Buddhist Karen. Missionaries taught them to be Karen rather than Burman, and to enhance their influence over other Karen groups. Sgaw Karen were the first to articulate the concept of a Karen nation. They created the first Karen political organisations and dominated the Karen nationalist movement.

=== Colonial policy implications ===
The British gradually conquered Burma between 1826 and 1886 with military support from Karen. In the first Anglo-Burmese war (1824 to 1826) Karen provided guidance to British armies. Burmese authorities tried to punish them. Some Karen fled to areas then occupied by the British or resisted the government.

After the conquest, Burmese continued to resist. The Burmese capital Mandalay was conquered in the Third Anglo-Burmese War in 1885 with help from Karen.

Burman in the southern delta then rebelled, leaving the British to proclaim martial law. Missionaries successfully lobbied to recruit more Karen as auxiliaries to put down these rebellions.

Colonial policy was driven by the quest for resources. The Burmese river plains were used for agricultural products, while the surrounding hills were of much less economic value. Central Burma was governed through direct rule, while the frontier area where most minorities lived was governed indirectly.

Indian, Karen and other ethnic minorities helped to pacify the country. The 'direct and indirect rule' policy continued to influence political developments.

From 1930 to 1932, Burman again rebelled against the colonial state in what became known as the Saya San Rebellion. Karen helped to repress this rebellion. Karen helped to suppress the 1936 student strike and the general strike of 1938.

In 1937 Burma achieved the status of a colony separate from India. Burmese were incorporated into administrative and military bodies. The Burman nationalist movement began in the 1920s and by 1937 viewed entering the colonial army as 'collaborating' with the British. Thus the 'Burmese' army continued to be composed of ethnic minorities.

Ethnic Composition of the Armed Forces in Burma, 1931
Ethnic Group	No. in Army	Proportion of Army	Proportion of Population
Burman (Note: The census category "Burman" includes Shans and Mons, in addition to ethnic Burmans.)	472	12.30	75.11
Karen	1,448	37.74	9.34
Chin	868	22.62	2.38
Kachin	881	22.96	1.05
Others (Note: Includes other indigenous minorities as well as foreigners.)	168	4.38	12.12
Total	3,837	100	100

=== Political organizations ===
Karen were the first ethnic group to establish political organizations. In 1840, the Karen Baptist Convention (KBC) was established. This Christian organization trained Karen at conferences attended by Karen who had rarely before left their villages. The first Karen political organisation was established in 1881 and carried the name Karen National Association (KNA). The KNA sought to represent all Karen. From the beginning, however, it was dominated by Christians.

Karen flag

In the 1920s, the Karen and Burmese nationalist movements gained momentum. Dr. San C. Po, a western-educated lawyer and ethnic Karen made the first public announcement of the Karen aim to create a state in 1928. That same year a KNA member, Saw Tha Aye Gyi, wrote the Karen national anthem.

In 1937 a Karen flag was created. The British marked its inauguration as a public holiday. The British thus endorsed the Karen view of their history. The Karen identified themselves as Burma's first inhabitants, a claim that has had a variety of political consequences.

The Buddhist Karen National Association (BKNA) was established in 1939. KNA stuck with the British while BKNA established relations with the Burman. Pwo Buddhists resisted the efforts of Christian Karen to represent them in any political organization, although some Pwo Karen joined KNA.

The KNA evolved into the Karen National Union (KNU) in February 1947, one year before independence. The 1947 KNU charter, like the 1881 KNA charter, included all Karen. In 1947 the KNU formed an armed wing, the Karen National Liberation Army (KNLA). The KNU-KNLA functioned as a government thereafter, including levying taxes in regions they controlled.

The majority of Karen never supported armed conflict and never affiliated with the armed struggle of the KNU-KNLA. KNU-controlled areas rarely included a Karen majority. Most Karen lived outside KNU-dominated territory. This fact has stalled Karen unification.

The KNU's organisational structure has been copied by other insurgent groups in Burma. Each KNU unit was self-supporting. Armed units, hospitals, and schools were self-supporting. The strength of this strategy is that it is hard to erase a movement that lacks a centre. However, KNU units had trouble getting help from each other.

== World War II and its aftermath ==
Before World War II Karen were seen to be Christian and loyal to Britain. The Burmese nationalist movement was Buddhist and anti-imperialist. In 1941 Karen constituted 35% of the army, but only 9% of the population. Ethnic Burmans made up 24% of the army, but 75% of the population.

Ethnic Composition of the Armed Forces in Burma, 1941
Ethnic Group	No. in Army	Proportion of Army	Proportion of Population
Burman (Note: The census category "Burman" includes Shans and Mons, in addition to ethnic Burmans. Taylor does not list the Shans as having any members of the armed forces, which suggests the possibility that Shans were counted among Burmans; otherwise there may have been no Shans in the new Burma Army, and they may have been restricted to membership in the Territorial Army)	1,893	23.71	75.11
Karen	2,797	35.03	9.34
Chin	1,258	15.76	2.38
Kachin	852	10.61	1.05
Yunnanese	32	0.04	n/a
Chinese	330	4.13	n/a
Indians	2,578	32.29	n/a
Others (Note: Population statistics for 1941 are from the 1931 census because the data from the 1941 census was lost in World War II.)	168	2.10	n/a
Total	7,984	100	100

=== Japanese occupation ===
The Japanese army invaded Burma in 1942, bringing destruction to Burma's people and its institutions. The Japanese allowed a Burmese Independence Army (BIA) to form. It was the first time in Burma's history that a specific Burmese national army had operated. Ethnic Burmans were allowed to form a political and military institute allied with the Japanese. This strengthened Burmese nationalist discourse. The BIA excluded ethnic minorities because they were associated with the British. The BIA influenced Burma's future because the war in Burma was fought along ethnic lines.

BIA troops attacked Karen in early 1942 during the Myaungmya Incident. Four to six hundred villages (15–30%) in the Myaungmya District area were destroyed. The violence is estimated to have killed 1,800 to 5,000. The Pwo Karen who survived, despite the relative lack of association with British-aligned Karen, came to see themselves as Karen nationalists. The Myaungmya Incident strengthened a then-notional understanding of Karen identity. The incident laid the foundations for the subsequent ethnic conflict. Aung San later tried to smooth things out.

Christian Karen mostly stayed loyal to the British. The first Karen battalion was established in 1943. Karen were of particular importance for British units given their bravery and terrain knowledge. A Karen resistance army grew in the eastern hills.

Karen established a resistance network with the delta Karen. The Japanese discovered this and punished them. Karen armed units were crucial in the defeat of the Japanese at Taungoo in December 1944. In the Dawna Range Karen resisted Japanese efforts. capturing/killing a retreating army of 50,000 Japanese.

By 1945 the Karen resistance numbered 12,000. This army was trained to fight the Japanese and collaborating Burmans. Some British officials promised Karen leaders that after the war they would gain independence.

After the war Karen soldiers expected to be granted a state by the British. The sense among Karen veterans that they deserved self-determination partly explains the failure of later peacetalks between the KNU and the Tatmadaw.

=== Return of the colonial state ===
After the Japanese defeat, the British resumed their rule. State institutions had been destroyed, the agricultural sector was in ruins, and central authority was gone. Instead Burma became ruled by local warlords and armed groups. The BIA under Aung San's command emerged as one of the strongest parties.

Lord Mountbatten proposed the creation of a two-wing army. One would consist of Burmans and the other of non-Burmans, both under British command. The result was two armies. Each had its own history, traditions and maps of the future nation. Four Burman, two Karen, two Kachin, and 2 Chin battalions were established. Aung San's demand to retain his former units in the new army was confirmed in the Kandy Conference of 6–7 September 1945 in Kandy, Sri Lanka.

The British also created two political units. However, the influence of Aung San and his Patriotic Burmese Forces (PBF) backed by the Anti-Fascist People's Freedom League (AFPFL) grew. Karen and other minorities were unwilling to be in a Burman-dominated state. In August 1945 Karen leaders Saw Ba U Gyi and Sydney Loo-Nee proposed to a British official to create a state called 'Karenistan'. In September 1945 a group of Karen drafted a memorial demanding the creation of the United Frontier Karen States.

The biggest dilemma for Karen people in this period was territory. Mary Callahan, an expert on Burmese Tatmadaw history wrote, "However, some combination of confidence (due to their experiences in prewar and wartime western institutions) and fear of mistreatment by the Burman majority kept Karen leaders in the army and in the society from moving toward a compromise with the AFPFL." In 1946 the Goodwill mission left for London. A delegation of four Karen people went to London to present the Karen case. They returned without an agreement, possibly due to other demands from the Kachin, Chin and Shan peoples.

==== Formation of the KNU ====
In February 1947, KNA, Baptist KNA, Buddhist KNA, the KCO and its youth wing established the Karen National Union or the KNU. KNU used a sharper tone, demanding independence and boycotting constituent Assembly elections. This boycott effectively removed a Karen voice from the debates that were to come.

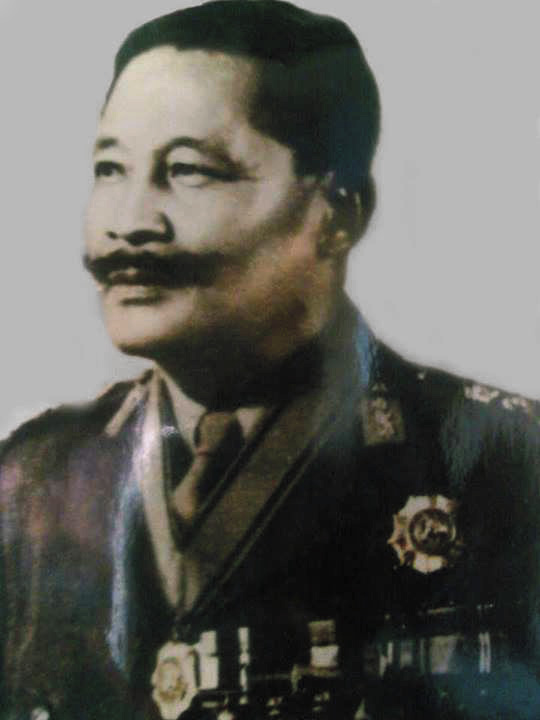
General Smith Dun, the first commander-in-chief of the Burmese Army after independence

Aung San tried to engage all ethnic minorities in Burma. On 12 February 1947 he signed the Panglong Agreement with representatives of the Shan, Kachin and Chin peoples. No formal delegation of Karen was present, supposedly because the Karen leadership did not trust the Burman leaderships' support for a Karen State. By this time KNU leadership was boycotting all government-organised gatherings.

In 1947, the Burmese government issued a new constitution, but this document failed to address and resolve the Karen question. On 17 July 1947, KNU headquarters ordered the establishment of Karen fighting units, known as Karen National Defence Organisation or KNDO's. KNU also established an underground communication line with the Karen Rifles within the Burmese Army. In October 1947, the AFPFL asked KNU to create a Karen state, but KNU refused, demanding more territory.

The British feared losing control of the Burman wing of the army, leading British officer Thomas to turn to the Karens. Thomas apparently hoped that British-trained Karen officials could influence the anti-British Burman squadrons. The 'Karenization' of the army put Karen in the highest positions. Chief of staff General Smith Dun, chief of the air force Saw Shi Sho, and the chief of operations were all ethnic Karen. The chief of operations, Saw Kya Doe, was trained in Sandhurst Brig. All the supporting services, the staff, supply and ammunition depots, the artillery and signal corps were commanded by Karen officers. Despite Karen dominance, Karen leadership was afraid of Burmese retaliation and refrained from radical changes.

== Since Burmese independence ==
Kayin State in Myanmar

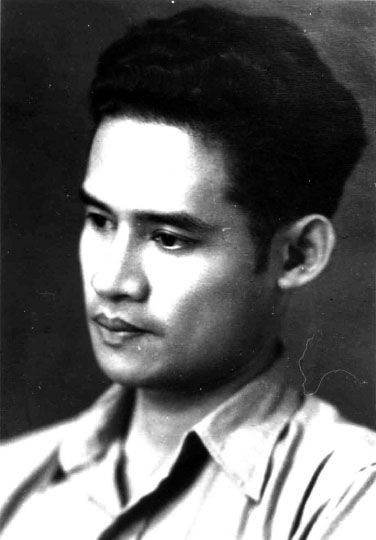
Saw Ba U Gyi, the first President of the Karen National Union

=== 1948 ===
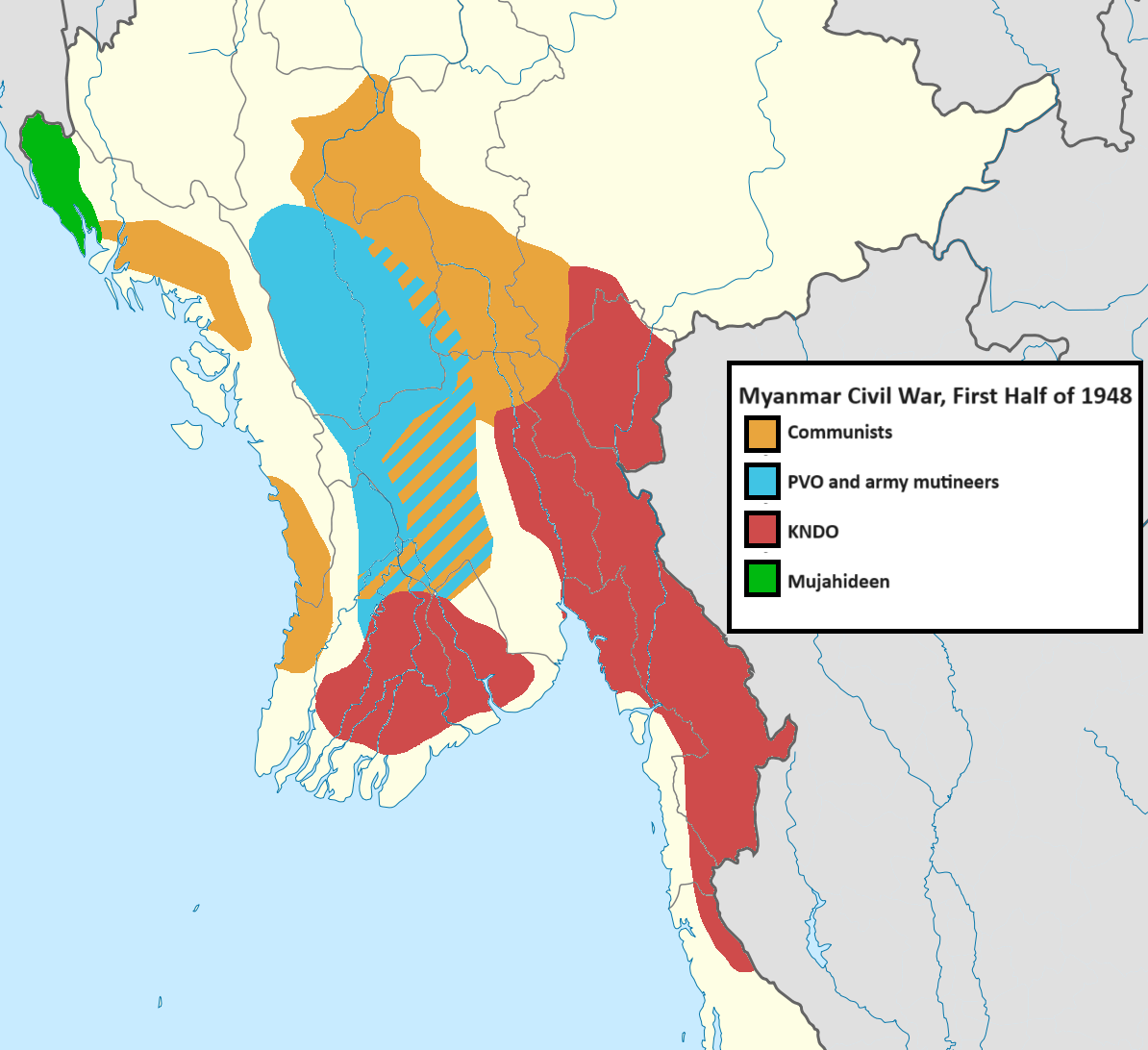
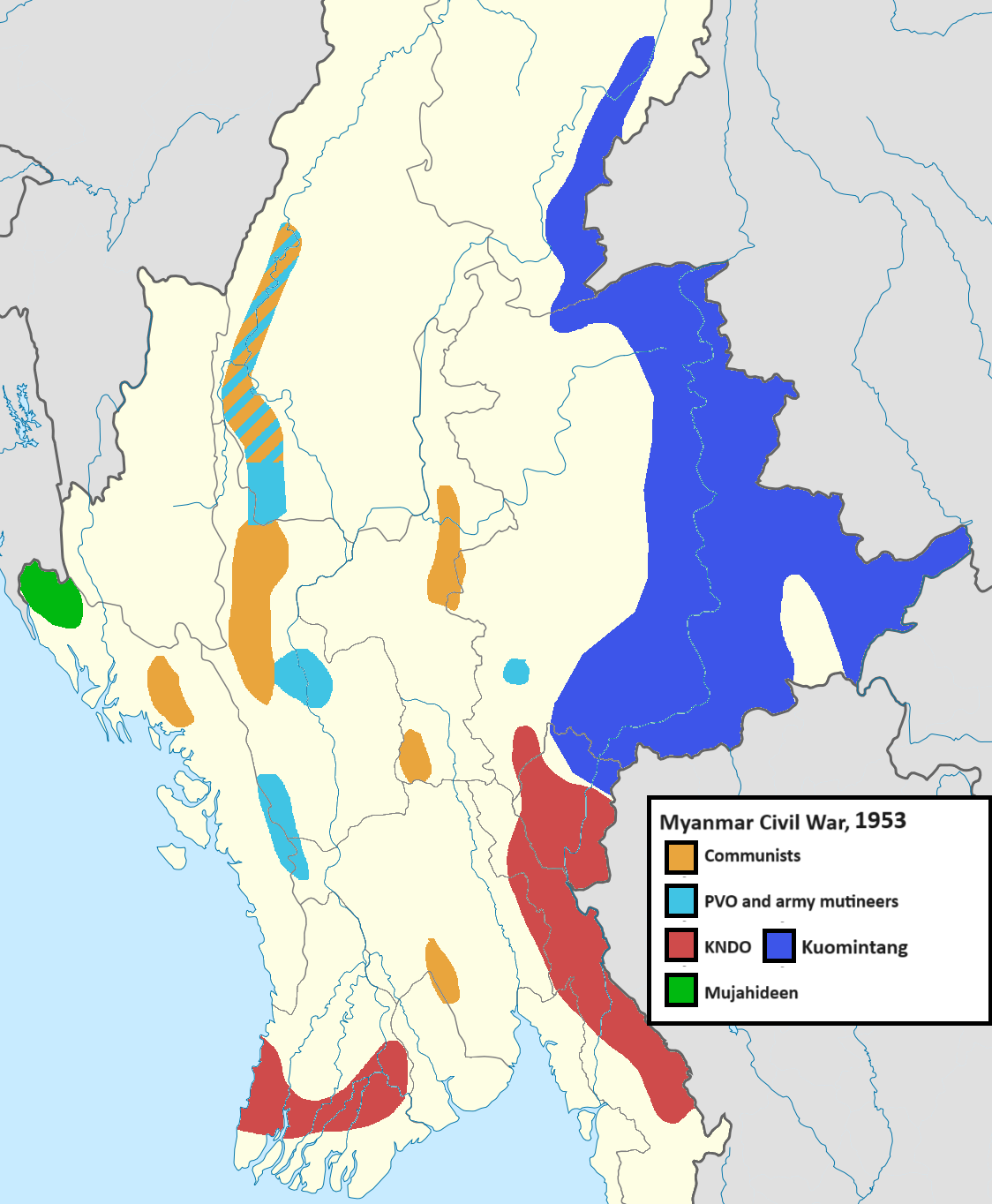
Map of insurgent activity in Burma in 1948 (top) and 1953 (bottom)

On 4 January 1948 Burma gained its independence. State authority and state structures were undeveloped. In February 1948 four hundred thousand Karen peacefully demonstrated for the creation of Karen State. Within three months, the Communist Party of Burma began an armed rebellion, while some Karen separatist groups started an armed independence struggle. Many KNDO members were wartime veterans and were in the anti-Japan/government resistance.

Later in January 1948 KNDO units raided the arms depot in KNDO-controlled Insein. KNDO and AFPFL distrust of Karen inflamed tensions. The British Service Mission (BSM) advised the Burmese military after independence, favouring Karen for promotion and positions of authority.

The Karen-led army helped to suppress the communist rebellion throughout 1948 and thus supported the government. In May 1948 AFPFL made a concession to the communist rebels and allowed them participate in national politics. Karen leaders, mostly anti-communist, interpreted this as proof that it was impossible for Karen to live under that government.

In June 1948 former PBF officers organised meetings to address the growing power of Karen in the army and to stop the communist rebellion. From May to August minor violence occurred between Karen and Burman troops. A split in the Third Burif troops on 10 August 1948 exacerbated tensions.

Karen leadership distrusted the Third Burifs led by eventual coup leader and president, Ne Win. Desertions resulted in a stronger Karen grip on the army. The army and KNDO then controlled large areas of the countryside. On 14 August 1948, Karen militias took over Twante near Rangoon. Other Karen militias took over Thaton and Kyaikkami a week later. On 30 August, KNDO took over Thaton and Moulmein.

In 1948 armed groups who tried violence included Karen army leadership, KNDO, Karen Peace Guerillas (local defence units), most of the police, and the Union Auxiliary Forces. The other camp could be defined as leftist/anti-British.

In mid-1948 then prime minister U Nu and Karen leader Saw Ba U Gyi toured the Irrawaddy delta to defuse escalation. Ordered by Gen. Smith Dun and with permission of U Nu, local KNDO units attacked communist rebels and took the Twante channel, connecting Rangoon with the Irrawaddy river. Rangoon newspapers reported this to be the beginning of the Karen insurgency. This event exacerbated tension between Karen and Burman.

In the last four months of 1948 violence escalated. Some British officers stayed in the eastern jungle to support independence. One was arrested on 18 September. The Burmese press highlighted the incident, announcing a Karen rebellion, which led to more Burmese violence.

On 19 September, Tin Tut, a rightist leader viewed as an ally by many Karen, was assassinated in Rangoon. General Smith Dun mediated a peace deal between KNDO units and AFPFL in November. This outraged pro-AFPFL officers within the army.

On 13 November 1948 KNU demanded an independent Karen-Mon state that would surround Rangoon. The Burmese press saw this as a move against the government. The escalation of tension and violence resulted in larger incidents in December. On Christmas Eve a locally raised ethnic Burman Sitwundan militia group threw grenades into a church in Palaw, killing eighty Christian Karen. The following weeks hundreds of Karen were murdered by Sitwundan and Socialist groups triggering KNDO retaliation.

=== 1949 ===
Sitwundan units and Burmese students and others moved in amid skirmishes during January. KNDO leaders called in reinforcements. KNDO units set up roadblocks in the area. Burmans living in Insein started arming themselves. Confrontations spread to wherever Burmans and Karens were living in proximity, mostly in the river delta. In mid-January 150 Karen were killed in Taikkyi Township. KNDO units again retaliated. The press inflamed public opinion.

Karen Colonel Min Maung was asked to create a diversion to break the stalemate by Saw Ba U Gyi. On 27 January 1949, Maung's First Karen Rifles seized the town of Taungoo. Karen naval commander Saw Jack attacked Pathein and other Karen troops seized Pyu the following day. On 30 January, KNDO was outlawed by the government and Karen were purged from the army two days later. Prime Minister Nu expelled all Karen leaders from their military posts, replacing general Smith Dun with Ne Win. The remainder of Karen in the armed forces either joined the rebellion or were interned.

The Karen National Union declared war on the Burmese government on 31 January 1949 and shortly thereafter KNU president Saw Ba U Gyi created the Four Principles:

- Surrender is out of the question.
- Recognition of the Karen State must be completed.
- We shall retain our arms.
- We shall determine our destiny.

These principles prevented the KNU from compromising with the Tatmadaw.

The Insein skirmishes escalated into a battle by 31 January 1949. The government retook Taungoo in March and the town of Insein in May, after heavy losses on both sides. On 14 June KNU proclaimed the Karen Free State or Kawthoolei. Prominent Karen such as General Smith Dun refused to join the rebellion.

=== 1950s to 1960s ===
KNU's initial military success changed during the 1950s. In 1954 the British Service Mission (BSM) closed. It was a colonial legacy and many employees sympathised with the Karen. During this decade the Tatmadaw reorganised and transformed into a standing army.

The Tatmadaw introduced the Four Cuts strategy in the late 1960s. The strategy aimed to separate rebellious groups from their sources of food, funds, intelligence and recruits. This strategy proved to be effective. In 1963–1964 peace talks yielded no result.

In the 1950s and 1960s Karen insurgency groups attacked Burmese targets in the Irrawaddy river delta. The Four Cuts strategy eventually forced the delta Karen into the border hills. After 1966 General Bo Mya served as KNU leader in the eastern division of the Karen conflict. In 1976, the KNU reformed under Gen. Bo Mya and after 1976 the KNU developed a strong anti-communist character.

=== 1970s ===
In the 1970s KNU struggled with internal rebellions, such as the rise of the Telecon. This religious sect was founded in the nineteenth century. Telecon presented themselves as the true Karen, posing a threat to KNU leadership. In 1972 Telecon leaders were executed after an invitation from the KNLA Sixth Brigade Commander. Another example of KNU internal conflict is the case of Lt-Col. Thu Mu Hae. His sixteenth battalion under the command of KNLA's Sixth Brigade Commander began acting independently in the late 1980s. KNU officials could only enter Kawkareik township if they were accompanied by fifty or more soldiers, because Thu Mu Hae had in effect created a private army.

In 1976 the KNU changed its demand for an independent Karen State into a demand for more autonomy. The history of the Karen insurgency was rewritten, leaving out the history of the KNU's communist-inspired wing.

=== 1980s to 1990s ===
The first Karen started to cross the Thai border in 1984, driven by the Tatmadaw's Four Cuts offensive, which lasted until 1990. In 1989 KNU rejected a Tatmadaw ceasefire proposal.

By the mid-1990s tens of thousands of Karen refugees lived in camps along the Thai border. After the fall of Manerplaw on 27 January 1995, 10,000 refugees crossed the border, mostly Karen. The Karen resistance survived for decades because of its border location. The introduction of the Burmese Way to Socialism helped to create the KNU's financial base via border trade with Thailand. The KNU levied taxes on trade. KNU and other Karen armed groups used the refugee camps in Thailand as sources for material support. KNU/KNLA family members received shelter and supplies from the camps.

The KNU reached the height of its power in the 1980s and early 1990s.In 1994 peace talks renewed and again KNU leadership refused a ceasefire. Former KNU Foreign Affairs Secretary David Taw described how in 1993 exiled Burmese politicians told General Bo Mya not to pursue a ceasefire. They expected that the 'international community' would soon start to support the KNU through diplomacy.

In December 1994 a thousand KNU soldiers established the Democratic Karen Buddhist Army or DKBA. These Buddhists troops had been complaining for years about anti-Buddhist discrimination by local Christian KNU officers.

Shortly after its founding, DKBA agreed to a ceasefire with the Burmese government. While not necessarily aligned with the government, the DKBA primarily focused on opposing the KNU. The DKBA never developed a unifying Karen nationalist political policy, and partly due to its lack of English proficiency, the DKBA did not develop international support. The DKBA does not use terms such as democratic, liberal, or human rights welcomed by Western democratic discourse. DKBA-controlled areas taught Burmese instead of Karen, in accord with government policy. Many of the DKBA's armed forces became Border Guard Forces (BGF).

These Buddhist Karen soldiers were dissatisfied with the KNU's Christian leadership and corruption, and ended ceasefire negotiations. A final split was triggered by a dispute over the building of a Buddhist pagoda on a strategic hill near Manerplaw by the Thai border. With the help of the Tatmadaw this group overran the KNU headquarters there. The DKBA developed into a stronger and bigger organisation than the KNU over the following years.

In 1995, 1996, and 1997 meetings were held between KNU leadership and the Tatmadaw. However General Bo Mya and other hard-liners refused to accept any ceasefire proposal. In 1997 KNU leadership hardened their position, demanding the release of political prisoners and more dialogue. This further reduced their strength. In 1997 former KNU-KNLA armed units established the Karen Peace Force or KPF. In 1998 the KNU forestry minister established the P'doh Aung San Group. In the same year a small ceasefire group was founded in Taungoo district.

In the southern part of Karen State or Myanmar twin brothers Johnny and Luther Htoo established God's Army in February 1997. The brothers led villagers and KNLA members of the Fourth Brigade of the Tenasserim Region into armed clashes with government troops, separated from the KNU's leaders. Eventually the two hundred strong militia occupied a hospital in Thailand's Ratchaburi and then dissolved.

After the fall of Manerplaw the KNU lost its Kawmoora stronghold to the north, which cost it most of its income derived from tax revenue, logging deals and cross-border trade. The loss of its financial base was also due to changing international relations. The threat of Communism disappeared in the 1990s, leading the US and Thai government to change policies. When KNU attacked an oil pipeline in Karen state in 1995, the US government officially warned them for the first time.

=== 2000s to 2010s ===
The Karen split up into many armed units after the 1990s. The KNU had become weak. In 2004 ceasefire talks were held again between Gen. Bo Mya and Burmese general Khin Nyunt. Khin Nyunt was later expelled from the government. In 2005 two more peace talks were held, but the new government under the leadership of Than Shwe was not interested in a ceasefire. In 2006 KNU leader General Bo Mya died.

One-time KNU general-secretary Padoh Mahn Sha Lah Phan became the new leader. Padoh Mahn Sha was important for political relations and the KNU reorganisation. On 14 February 2008, he was assassinated. In 2007 Major General Htin Maung left with a sizeable portion of the KNLA Seventh Brigade to form the KNU-KNLA Peace Council. It further decimated the KNU's strength and influence.

On 20 March 2010, 2 people were killed and 11 were wounded in a blast on a bus in Karen state.

In November 2010 border areas saw an upsurge in fighting following elections. Twenty thousand people fled to Thailand. For the first time in fifteen years, the KNU and the DKBA united to fight the Tatmadaw. As of early 2011 the KNU was only one in seven Karen armed factions. The KNU holds barely any territory inside Burma and the future of the organisation and the struggle for Karen independence is uncertain.

A ceasefire was reached on 12 January 2012 in Hpa-an and fighting stopped in nearly all Karen State. The KNU signed the Nationwide Ceasefire Agreement (NCA) with the government on 15 October 2015, along with seven other insurgent groups. However, in March 2018, the government violated the agreement by sending 400 Tatmadaw soldiers into KNU territory to build a road connecting two military bases. Armed clashes erupted in the Ler Mu Plaw area of Hpapun District, displacing 2,000 people. On 17 May 2018, the Tatmadaw agreed to "temporarily postpone" their road project and to withdraw troops from the area.

=== Since 2021 ===
Military situation in Myanmar as of 10 January 2025

The KNU resumed its fight following the 2021 military coup.

On 27 April 2021, KNU insurgents captured Thaw Le Hta army camp on the west bank of the Salween River. The Tatmadaw later retaliated with airstrikes. No casualties were reported by either side.

On 21 March 2022, Karen forces overran the Maw Khee base near the Thai border in Dooplaya District. The junta army suffered casualties when they tried to counter-attack in the village of Bla Doh.

On 17 May 2022, the KNLA took Thay Baw Bo camp south of Myawaddy from the Tatmadaw, which had occupied the camp since 1990.

On 9 February 2023, the KNU stated that a total of 8,038 clashes between the Tatmadaw and KNU forces (KNDO and KNLA) had taken place in KNU-controlled areas since the coup in February 2021.

On 9 April 2023, fierce fighting erupted between the combined resistance forces and the Border Guard Forces near the new city of Shwe Kokko, prompting more than 10,000 people to flee across the border to Thailand.

== Thailand and the United States ==
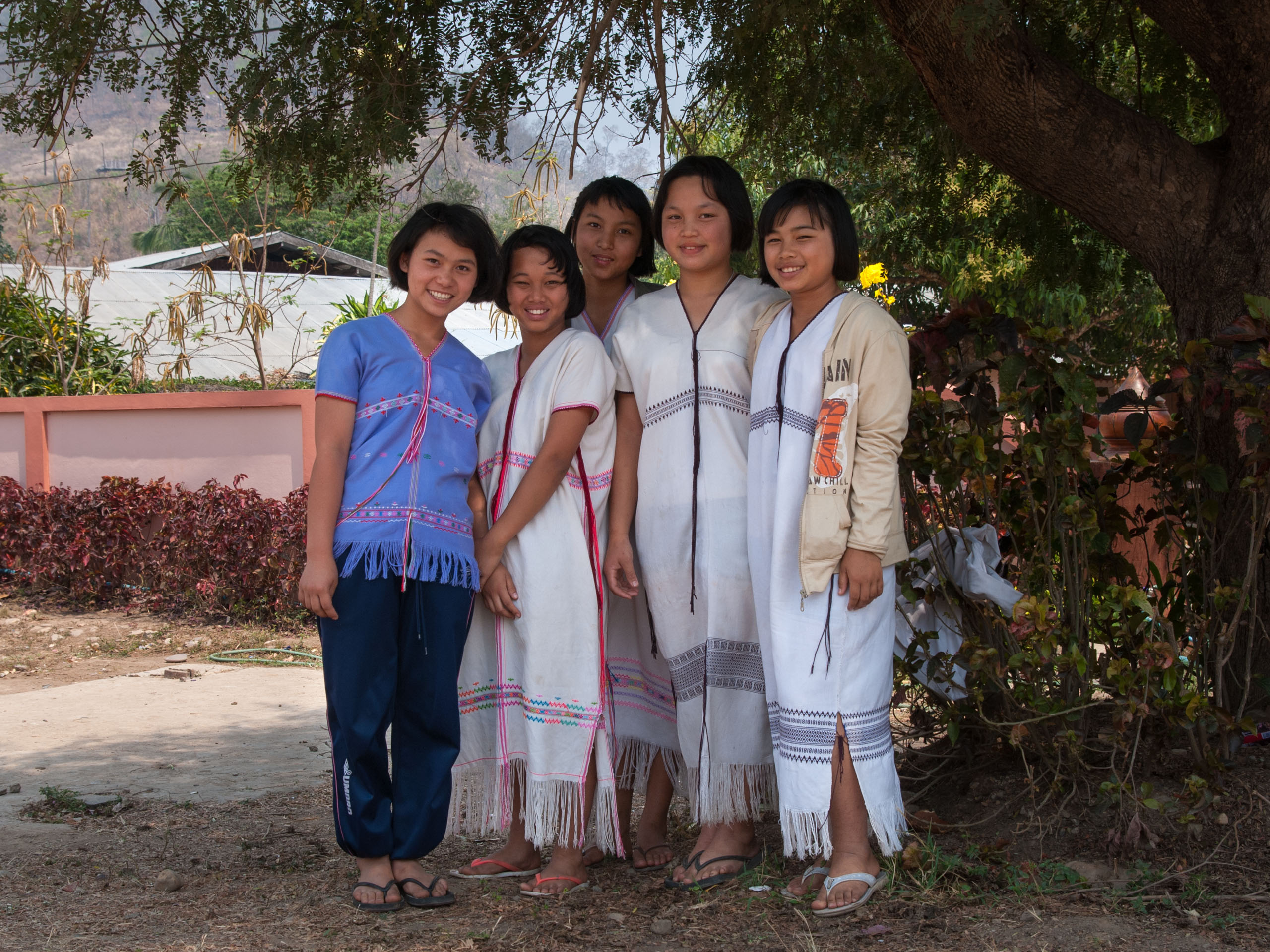
S'gaw Karen girls of Khun Yuam District, Mae Hong Son Province, Thailand

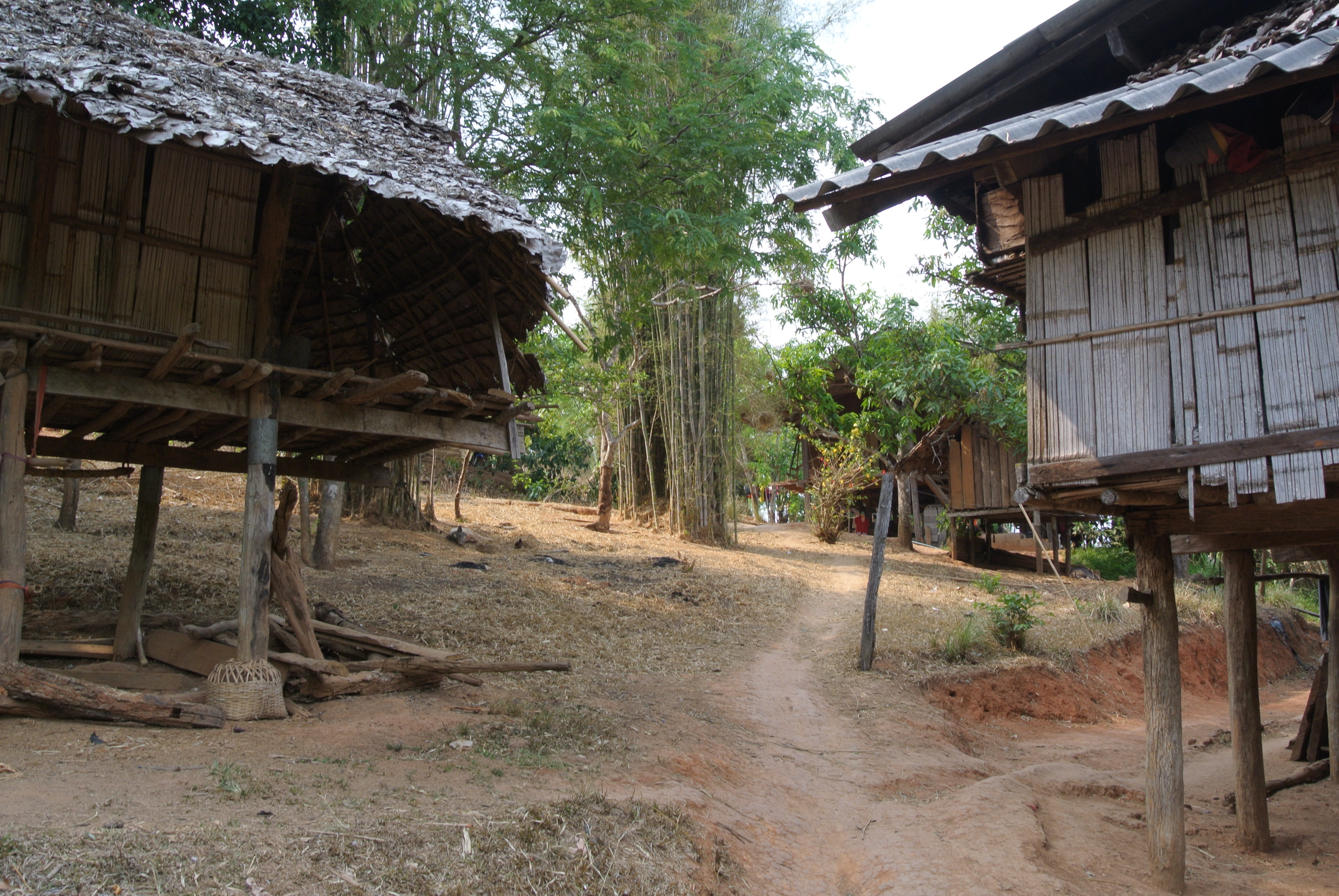
A Karen village in Thailand

The Thai government historically used Karen State as a buffer against the Burmese. After WWII the Thais were afraid of a communist insurgency developing from a union between China-supported Thai and Burmese communists. Thus the Thai and US governments supported Karen rebellions until the end of the Cold War. The US government also supported the Burmese government's fight against the communists, providing weapons and helicopters. The KNU claimed that these weapons were used against them.

General Bo Mya once described the KNU as Thailand's 'foreign legion'. Because the KNU guarded the border Thai and Burmese communists could not unify. The shift to the right in 1976 under Bo Mya was a strategy to gain Thai support. Thail policy changed in the 1990s when the Thai government started engaging its neighbours' governments as equals. In 1997 Burma became a member of ASEAN. The Thai government subsequently ended support for armed Karen groups.

The KNU organisational structure was copied by other Burmese insurgent groups. Each KNU unit was self-supporting, including armed units, hospitals and schools. The strength of this strategy is that it is hard to erase since it lacks a centre. The KNU's weakness and disadvantage has been that KNU units had trouble getting help from their neighbouring KNU units.

=== Refugees ===
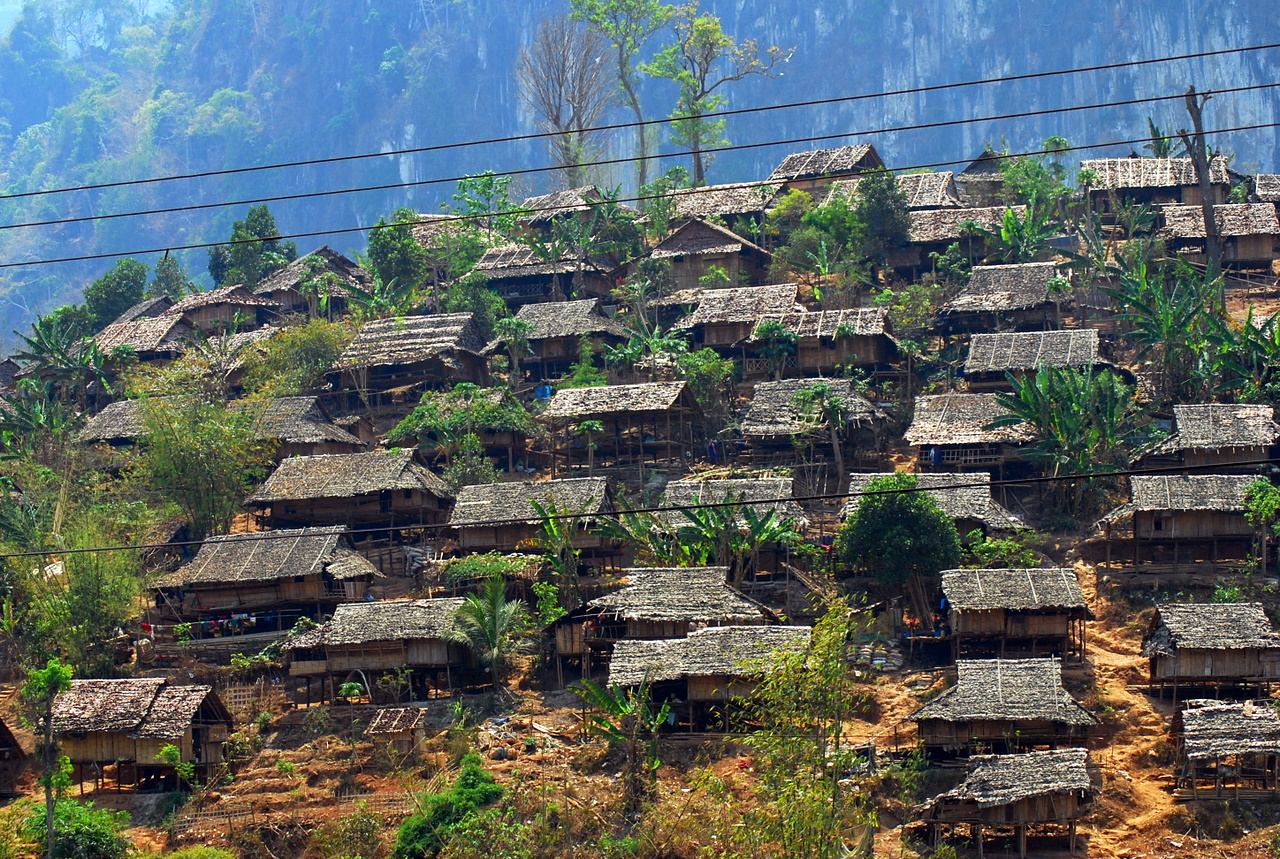
The Mae La refugee camp in Thailand

At least two million people of many different ethnic groups are internally displaced in Burma. Another two million ethnic minorities from Burma have found refuge in neighbouring countries. A large portion of this latter group is Karen. The first Karen refugees started to arrive in Thailand in 1984. The KNU has greatly benefited from the refugee camps in Thailand. The KNU used these camps as safehavens and received food and other materials through family members and friends who stayed in the camps.

Around two hundred thousand Karen reside in nine refugee camps within Thailand on border. In 2006 a resettlement program was set up. 73,775 Karen people were resettled in July 2011 to mostly Western countries, predominantly the US. In January 2011 the Thai Burmese Border Consortium (TBBC) set the total number of refugees at 141,549 people. The camps are operated under the Thai government, by the Karen Refugee Committee (KRC) which is responsible for clinics, schooling and internal administration.

== See also ==
- 2010–2012 Myanmar border clashes
- History of Myanmar
- Timeline of Burmese history

== Bibliography ==
- Aung-Thwin, Michael; Aung-Thwin, Maitrii (15 October 2013). A History of Myanmar since Ancient Times: Traditions and Transformations. Reaktion Books. ISBN 978-1-86189-939-2.
- Brant, Charles S.; Khaing, Mi Mi (1961). "Missionaries among the Hill Tribes of Burma". Asian Survey. 1 (1): 44–51. doi:10.2307/3023666. ISSN 0004-4687. JSTOR 3023666.
- Brouwer, Jelmer; van Wijk, Joris (1 October 2013). "Helping hands: external support for the KNU insurgency in Burma". Small Wars & Insurgencies. 24 (5): 835–856. doi:10.1080/09592318.2013.866422. ISSN 0959-2318. S2CID 143872483.
- Callahan, Mary P. (2005). Making enemies war and state building in Burma. Cornell University Press. OCLC 1224850616.
- Callahan, M. (November 2009). "Myanmar's perpetual junta. Solving the Riddle of the Tatmadaw's Long Reign". New Left Review. 60: 27–63.
- Christie, Clive J. (2000). "Anatomy of a Betrayal: The Karens of Burma". In Tauris, I.B. (ed.). A modern history of Southeast Asia decolonization, nationalism and separatism. I.B. Tauris. pp. 54–80. ISBN 978-0-7556-1869-9. OCLC 1356695720.
- Gravers, M. (2003). "The Karen Making of a Nation". In Tønnesson, Stein; Antlöv, Hans (eds.). Asian forms of the nation. RoutledgeCurzon. pp. 237–269. ISBN 0-7007-0403-5. OCLC 35521391.
- Holliday, Ian (2011). Burma Redux: Global Justice and the Quest for Political Reform in Myanmar. Hong Kong University Press. ISBN 978-988-8083-74-9.
- Harriden, Jessica (2002). ""Making a Name for Themselves:" Karen Identity and the Politicization of Ethnicity in Burma". Journal of Burma Studies. 7 (1): 84–144. doi:10.1353/jbs.2002.0003. ISSN 2010-314X. S2CID 144325668.
- Hinton, P. (1983). "Do the Karen really exist?". In McKinnon, John; Bhruksasri, Wanat (eds.). Highlanders of Thailand. Oxford University Press. pp. 155–168. ISBN 978-0-19-580472-0.
- Jorgensen, Anders Baltzer (2010). "Foreword". In Marshall, Harry Ignatius (ed.). The Karen people of Burma: a study in anthropology and ethnology. [BiblioLife]. p. V – XI. ISBN 978-1-142-76233-9. OCLC 773009472.
- Keyes, Charles F (2003), "Afterword: The Politics of "Karen-Ness" in Thailand", Living at the Edge of Thai Society, Abingdon, UK: Taylor & Francis, pp. 210–218, doi:10.4324/9780203356456_afterword
- Lang, Hazel J. (2002). Fear and Sanctuary : Burmese Refugees in Thailand. Cornell University Press. ISBN 978-1-5017-1936-3. OCLC 1101915898.
- Marshall, Harry Ignatius (2010). The Karen people of Burma : a study in anthropology and ethnology. [BiblioLife]. ISBN 978-1-142-76233-9. OCLC 773009472.
- Thant, Myint-U (2001). Making of Modern Burma. Cambridge University Press. ISBN 1-280-15907-3. OCLC 824532742.
- Pedersen, Daniel (2011). Secret genocide : voices of the Karen of Burma. Maverick Publishing Limited. ISBN 978-1-905379-78-1. OCLC 871536487.
- Petry, Jeffrey Louis (1995). The sword of the spirit: Christians, Karens, colonialists, and the creation of a nation of Burma (Thesis thesis). Rice University. hdl:1911/19085.
- Rajah, A. (December 1992). "Contemporary Developments in Kawthoolei: The Karen and Conflict Resolution in Burma". Thai-Yunnan Project Newsletter. No. 19.
- Selth, Andrew (1987). "Race and Resistance in Burma, 1942–1945". Modern Asian Studies. 20 (3): 483–507. doi:10.1017/S0026749X00007836. ISSN 0026-749X. JSTOR 312534. S2CID 144936751.
- Ghose, Rajeshwari, ed. (August 1989). "Protest Movements in South and Southeast Asia: Traditional and Modern Idioms of Expression". The Journal of Asian Studies. 48 (3). Hong Kong: University of Hong Kong, Centre of Asian Studies: 676–677. doi:10.2307/2058719. ISSN 0021-9118. JSTOR 2058719. S2CID 162957266.
- Smith, Martin (1 June 1999). Burma: Insurgency and the Politics of Ethnicity. Bloomsbury Academic. ISBN 978-1-85649-660-5.
- South, Ashley (2011). Burma's Longest War: Anatomy of the Karen Conflict. Transnational Institute. pp. 1–53.
- Thawnghmung, A. Maung (2008). "The Karen Revolution in Burma: Diverse Voices, Uncertain Ends". www.google.com.
- Netherlands, Burma Centrum (2013). "Burma's Ethnic Challenge: From Aspirations to Solutions | Transnational Institute Burma Policy Briefing no. 12". www.tni.org. pp. 1–20.
- Worland, Shirley L. (March 2010). Displaced and misplaced or just displaced: Christian Displaced Karen Identity after Sixty Years of War in Burma (Thesis). The University of Queensland. pp. 1–323.

=== Documentary ===
- Karen people full video History – Forgotten, 26 October 2013
