= Battle of Kawmoora =

1989–1995 battle of the Karen conflict

Coordinates: 16.795°N 98.518°E

- Part of the Karen conflict
| Date | 20 May 1989 – 21 February 1995 (5 years, 9 months and 1 day) |
| Location | Kawmoora, Kayin State, Myanmar |
| Result | SLORC / DKBA victory |

Belligerents
| Myanmar (SLORC); DKBA | Karen National Union |

Commanders and leaders
| Chief of No. (4) Bureau of Special Operations: Lieutenant General Maung Hla | Officer Commanding of No. (7) Brigade: Brigadier Taw Hla |

Units involved
| Tatmadaw; Myanmar Army; Southeastern Command; No. (22) Light Infantry Division (1995); No. (33) Light Infantry Division (1989); No. (44) Light Infantry Division (1995); No. (902) Artillery Operation Command | Karen National Liberation Army: No. (7) Brigade |

Strength
| 10,000 soldiers 100 artillery | 1,000 soldiers |

Casualties and losses
- 400 – 600 killed during 1994/1995 offensives 2,000 killed in total

The Battle of Kawmoora (ကော်မူးရာတိုက်ပွဲ), also known as the Battle of Wan Kha Thit (ဝမ်ခသစ်တိုက်ပွဲ), was a protracted battle between the Tatmadaw (Myanmar Armed Forces) and the Karen National Liberation Army (KNLA). Before 1994, the Tatmadaw was unable to capture the KNLA stronghold of Kawmoora due to the stronghold's robust fortifications and narrow access from Tatmadaw-held territory. The Tatmadaw instead fired artillery at enemy positions from Thai territory, with the permission of the Thai government. However, the Fall of Manerplaw on 27 January 1995 allowed the Tatmadaw to advance southward and capture Kawmoora on 21 February.

== Background ==
The Karen people of Kayin State (also known as Karen State) in eastern Myanmar (also known as Burma) are the third largest ethnic group in Myanmar, consisting of 7% of the country's total population, and have fought for independence and self-determination since 1949. The initial aim of the largest Karen opposition group, the Karen National Union (KNU), was to obtain independence for the Karen people by establishing Kawthoolei. However, in 1976 they instead began to call for a federal union with fair Karen representation, and the self-determination of the Karen people.

Built in 1985, Kawmoora was a KNLA stronghold located at a strategic border crossing that controlled minor trade between Myanmar and Thailand. It was surrounded by Thailand and had a narrow strip of land connecting it to the rest of Myanmar, fortified by a 50-metre (160 ft)-long border wall. Merchants paid taxes on goods being transported into Myanmar, but in 1989 trade nearly halted due to constant bombardment from the 902nd Artillery Operation Command of the Myanmar Army.

== Battle ==
Before 1994, the Myanmar Army made few attempts to take Kawmoora and instead bombarded the stronghold sporadically. The only way into Kawmoora was through a narrow 150-metre (490 ft)-wide strip of land connecting it to the rest of Myanmar. This strip of land was dubbed by both sides as "the killing zone", as it became a no man's land littered with corpses of fallen soldiers. The KNLA built concrete bunkers to guard the entrance to Kawmoora, and machine gun fire from these bunkers repelled the few infantry offensives attempted by the Myanmar Army. The first recorded military action at Kawmoora was on 20 May 1989.

The Fall of Manerplaw allowed the Myanmar Army to send more soldiers southward towards Kawmoora. On 21 February 1995, 10,000 soldiers from the Southeastern Command of the Myanmar Army prepared to make a final assault on Kawmoora. Chinese-manufactured 210 mm breach-loading siege mortars were used to destroy the frontline bunkers of the KNLA, allowing soldiers to enter Kawmoora. This was the first time the Myanmar Army had used those mortars. Kawmoora was captured on the same day and the KNLA retreated to new bases in Myanmar.

== Aftermath ==
In the aftermath of the battle, the Myanmar Army recorded 131 dead, 302 wounded, and two missing among their troops. The Myanmar Army claimed that KNLA casualties amounted to 212 dead and 231 wounded. The KNLA meanwhile claimed to have suffered only ten dead and "a few dozen wounded" in the final assault by the Myanmar Army. The KNLA also claimed to have killed 300 Burmese soldiers and wounded hundreds more. Additionally, three foreigners were reportedly killed in Kawmoora: an American, a Belgian, and a Japanese. The Uppsala Conflict Data Program recorded 411 deaths in Kawmoora from 20 May 1989 to 9 February 1995. Over 2,000 soldiers died here during the course of the siege that lasted nearly a decade
