= Papun =

Town in Kayin State, Myanmar

Papun / ဖာပွန်မြို့ ဖးဖူဝ့ၢ်ဖိ
- Town
- Location in Myanmar
- Coordinates: 18°03′53″N 97°26′42″E
- Country: Myanmar
- Division: Kayin State
- District: Hpapun District
- Township: Hpapun Township

Area
  - Total: 0.23 sq mi (0.60 km^{2})
- Elevation: 280 ft (85 m)

Population (2014)
  - Total: 3,028
  - Density: 13,000/sq mi (5,100/km^{2})
- Time zone: UTC+6.30 (MMT)
- Area code: 58
- Control: Karen National Liberation Army

Papun (Burmese: ဖာပွန်မြို့; Pwo Eastern Karen: ဍုံဖာပံင်; S'gaw Karen: ဖးဖူဝ့ၢ်ဖိ, also spelt Hpapun) is a town in northern Kayin State, Myanmar. It is on the east side of the Yunzalin River. It was formerly one of the headquarters of the Karen National Union and the Karen National Liberation Army. The Papun Airport is also located nearby.

It is also called Bu Tho (Burmese: ဘုသိ).

In 2014, the town had a population of only 3,028 people. According to the 2023 General Administration Department report for Hpapun Township as whole, Papun and the town of Kamamaung had a combined population of 20,308. In 2014, Kamamuang had a population of 20,895 people.

During the Myanmar civil war, the Karen National Liberation Army claimed to have seized the town on 28 March 2024 from the State Administration Council following a siege that began on 20 March.
