= Fall of Manerplaw =

1995 battle of the Karen conflict

Coordinates: 17.725°N 97.735°E

- Part of the Karen conflict
Date	27 January 1995
Location	Manerplaw, Kayin State, Myanmar
Result	SLORC / DKBA victory

Belligerents
Myanmar (SLORC); DKBA	Karen National Union; ABSDF

Units involved
Tatmadaw: Myanmar Army; Southeastern Command	Karen National Liberation Army: 6th Battalion; 7th Battalion

Strength
4,000–10,000; 400	Unknown

Casualties and losses
5 killed	10 killed, 50 wounded
- >9,000–10,000 civilians displaced

The Fall of Manerplaw occurred on 27 January 1995, when the village of Manerplaw was captured by the Tatmadaw (Myanmar Armed Forces) and the Democratic Karen Buddhist Army (DKBA). Manerplaw was the headquarters of two armed opposition groups, the Karen National Union (KNU) and the All Burma Students' Democratic Front (ABSDF). The final military assault by the Tatmadaw, aided by positional information provided by the DKBA, was met with little resistance by the KNLA, whose leaders had ordered a tactical retreat.

== Background ==
The Karen people of Kayin State (also known as Karen State) in eastern Myanmar (also known as Burma) are the third largest ethnic group in Myanmar, consisting of 7% of the country's total population, and have fought for independence and self-determination since 1949. The initial aim of the KNU was to obtain independence for the Karen people. However, in 1976 they instead began to call for a federal union in Myanmar with fair Karen representation, and the self-determination of the Karen people.

Up until the fall of Manerplaw, the village had been subjected to several military offensives by the Tatmadaw, and the surrounding area was the location of several alleged human right abuses by the military junta, including forced labour and extrajudicial punishment.

== Prelude ==
In December 1994, Buddhist and Christian factions of the KNU began to have disagreements on the construction of pagodas in Manerplaw. U Thuzana, a Karen Buddhist monk who ordered the construction and was then a member of the KNU, revolted against the organisation with others who were dissatisfied with the group's Christian-dominated leadership. On 11 December 1994, the KNLA clashed with Buddhist dissidents in Manerplaw. This ultimately led to a split in the KNU and the establishment of the DKBA on 21 December 1994. U Thuzana later brokered a deal with Major General Maung Hla, the southeastern regional commander of the Myanmar Army, and attempted to persuade Karen villagers to evacuate to DKBA protected refugee camps. U Thuzana also attempted to persuade Buddhist soldiers of the KNLA to defect to the DKBA and assist the Tatmadaw.

== Tatmadaw and DKBA offensive ==
In January 1995, 4,000 to 10,000 Tatmadaw and DKBA troops advanced towards Manerplaw, capturing several nearby villages. The Min Yaw Kee ridge, which in 1992 had been fiercely defended by the KNLA, was captured without a single shot being fired. Soldiers from the DKBA assisted the Tatmadaw by providing information on KNLA positions and guiding them through the jungle to Manerplaw. As the Tatmadaw and DKBA approached Manerplaw, an estimated 9,000 to 10,000 civilians fled from the village and its surrounding area, including from nearby refugee camps.

When the Tatmadaw and DKBA finally moved into Manerplaw on 27 January 1995, the leadership of the KNLA ordered their soldiers to retreat and to raze the village; the roughly 3,000 inhabitants of Manerplaw had already been evacuated by then.

== Aftermath ==
Five Tatmadaw and ten KNLA soldiers were killed in the final assault. Of the KNLA troops who managed to escape the Tatmadaw advance, 50 were treated for their wounds.

Most of the refugees who fled the fighting headed towards refugees camps in Thailand, near the Myanmar–Thailand border. After capturing Manerplaw, the Tatmadaw advanced towards nearby villages it previously could not reach, eventually reaching the southern KNU stronghold of Kawmoora, which fell to Tatmadaw soldiers on 21 February 1995.

A direct consequence of the fall of Manerplaw and its aftermath was that the KNU lost most of its income derived from local tax revenue, logging deals and cross-border trade, as the Tatmadaw captured several border towns.
