= Paul Kenny =

Paul Kenny may refer to:

- Sir Paul Kenny (trade unionist), British trade union leader
- Paul Kenny (politician), Canadian politician
- Paul Kenny (photographer), British artist and photographer
- Paul D. Kenny, Irish political scientist and author
- Paul Kenny (writer), creator of Francis Coplan, a fictional French secret agent
- Paul J. Kenny, professor of neuroscience
