= Dave Everett =

Australian criminal

- Born: David Francis Everett c. 1962; Campbell Town, Tasmania, Australia
- Died: 13 May 2013 (aged 51)
- Education: Strategic studies (honours); International relations (major); Journalism (major)
- Years active: 1978–86
- Known for: Most wanted criminal in Australia; Armed robbery; KNLA rebel soldier
- Criminal charges: Armed robbery; Deprivation of Liberty; Conspiracy to import heroin
- Criminal penalty: 10 years
- Spouses: Amanda Sears (divorced); Darryl Wookey (until his death)
- Children: 2

David Francis Everett (c. 1962 – 13 May 2013) was an Australian criminal, writer and former member of the Australian Special Air Service Regiment and Karen National Liberation Army. During his manhunt he was regarded as the most wanted man in the history of Australian criminals.

== Early life ==
David Everett was born in rural Tasmania in 1962 to a middle-class family and joined the Australian Army as an apprentice when he was aged 15.

== Military career ==
=== Australian Army ===
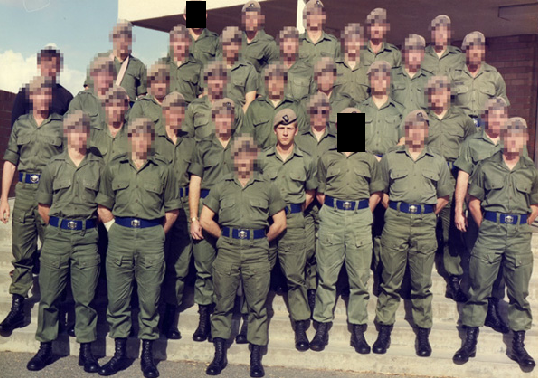
1983 SASR Graduation Class

Everett began his career as a mechanic fixing supply trucks and joined the Special Air Service Regiment (SASR) at 21 where he spent three and a half years.

He claimed the selection course was the hardest thing he had ever done in his life (including his prison sentence).

However, because the Australian Army was not at war, he left for Burma and took great interest in the Karen people.

=== Karen National Liberation Army ===
After leaving the Army in 1986, Everett joined the Karen National Liberation Army (KNLA) in Burma as a mercenary, arms dealer and gun for hire using the alias "Steve". He used his skills to teach soldiers how to survive in combat, most notably instructing them in marksmanship and the planting of claymore anti-personnel mines. He told a correspondent "If I get sick of it I'll go and do a nine to five job".

During his time in Burma in 1986 he went as far as meeting with General Bo Mya. In an interview with the Australian TV series A Current Affair words failed him when he tried to describe the atrocities committed against the Karen minority, but these atrocities inspired his cause.

"A two-year-old kid was... Just left him for dead, you know? It's terrible stuff... That's when I said this can't go on; people shouldn't do this to each other." – Everett.

== Return to Australia ==
In 1987 he returned to Australia and married.

Within the four years leading up to his crimes, Everett worked as a security guard, private investigator and owner-driver in a trucking business. In 1990 his wife, Amanda, gave birth to his first son Nicholas who was named after a Karen soldier he had fought with.

By most accounts Everett was a devoted father and a hard-working husband. During those years he also spoke fervently of his wish to move to the US and work for the FBI or the CIA.

== Criminality ==
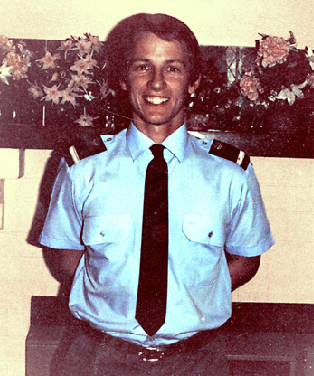
Everett, 1991, at some stage during his pilot training.

Realizing the funding of the Karen rebellion was too meagre, Everett took up pilot lessons so he could smuggle weapons back to Burma. To do this he needed money and turned to armed robbery involving former SASR comrade James Reynolds and another unknown accomplice who too was suspected by police to be ex-SASR.

In 1991 in Perth, Western Australia, all three raided the home of a theatre manager and his pregnant wife of 6 months taking the couple at gun-point for three hours in order to open the safe to gain access to the funds. They stole the money but were later caught. Everett, however, was released on bail whilst Reynolds committed suicide in prison, the third accomplice escaped capture and remained unidentified.

Afterwards he flew first to Cairns, and later to Magnetic Island off the North Queensland coast where he taught rappelling as part of a tour operation. Everett then fled when a police drug-raid took place by chance.

He then returned to Western Australia and perpetrated two more robberies on two separate IGA shopping centres by surveying the owners, tracking them home and holding them hostage in two attempts to break into their safes, both of which were empty.

Finally he went down to an explosives storage magazine in Baldivis, south of Perth, in order to get munitions for a gold robbery to pay for his mother's house that had been confiscated by the courts. In the process he set off one tonne of explosives in what is still the largest explosion in Australian criminal history, and which was audible from many miles away.

=== Prison sentence ===
Everett was caught in 1991 after the police were tipped off by an associate. While awaiting trial he faked his own abduction with a .22 semi-automatic rifle he had buried in his backyard years earlier. He was recaptured 12 months later after a large police manhunt.

=== Release ===
Whilst in prison used his time to complete a Bachelor of Arts degree, majoring in international relations and journalism and in 1999 he graduated with Honors in Strategic Studies. After his release he co wrote his book, Shadow Warrior, with the author Kingsley Flett

== Later life and death ==
Everett was released in 2002 following ten and a half years in prison. He apparently maintained good relations with his children and married Australian Commonwealth government lawyer Darryl Wookey. He died aged 51 on 13 May 2013 after a year long battle with cancer.

== See also ==
- Blekingegadebanden
