= Bo Mya =

Burmese political leader (1927–2006)

Saw Bo Mya

Chairman of the Karen National Union

Personal details
- Born: 20 January 1927 Htimukhi village, Hpapun Township, British Burma
- Died: 24 December 2006 (aged 79) Mae Sot, Thailand
- Party: Karen National Union
- Spouse: Naw Lar Po
- Children: 3 daughters, 4 sons

Bo Mya (Burmese: ဘိုမြ [bò mja̰]; born Htee Moo Kee; 20 January 1927 – 24 December 2006) was a Karen leader born in Papun District, which is in present-day Karen State, Myanmar. He was a long-standing chairman of the Karen National Union (KNU), a political organisation of the Karen people, from 1976 to 2000. He stepped down to become vice-chairman in 2004, and retired in 2004 from all public offices, due to poor health.

== Early career ==
Bo Mya was among a significant number of Karens who joined the British — specifically in Bo Mya's case, Force 136 — during World War II, with whom he fought the Japanese from the East Dawna hills in 1944 to 1945.

After the Karens declared independence from Burma in 1949, Bo Mya quickly rose to a position of pre-eminence in the Karen movement, earning a reputation as a hard and ruthless operator. Based at Manerplaw ("victory field") close to the Thai-Burma border, the KNU under his control, and its military wing the Karen National Liberation Army (KNLA), was probably the most successful of the ethnic rebel organisations fighting Rangoon in the Karen Conflict in the 1970s and 1980s.

== 1990s ==
But by the mid-1990s, the tide was turning against him. A devout Christian of the Seventh-day Adventist Church, Bo Mya had always risked antagonising elements from within the predominantly Karen Buddhist and animist KNLA ranks. Although his defenders say he treated both Christians and Buddhists equally, the fact that the top positions of the KNU were filled almost entirely by Christians seemed to confirm the impression that he promoted the minority Christians' interests at the expense of those of the Buddhists and animists.

In late 1994, a group of KNLA soldiers broke away from the main army and formed the Democratic Karen Buddhist Army (DKBA). They allied themselves with the Burmese military, and led Burmese troops into Manerplaw in December 1994, leading to its capture — the biggest single setback to the Karens in their post-war history.

Since then, the KNU and KNLA's effectiveness has gradually diminished. This was demonstrated at the beginning of 2004 when Bo Mya travelled to Yangon (Rangoon), his first visit to the capital in 50 years, to hold peace talks with Khin Nyunt, who was Prime Minister at the time.

== Death ==
On 24 December 2006, Bo Mya died in a hospital in Mae Sot, Thailand, near the eastern border of Myanmar. He had heart disease and diabetes and was unable to walk for three years before his death.
