= Mr. Moustache =

Mr. Moustache may refer to:

- "Mr. Moustache", a song on Nirvana's 1989 album Bleach
- Mr. Moustache, one of the Mr. Men series of children's books
- Bo Nat Khann Mway (1961–2016), also known by his aliases as "General Saw Lah Pwe", "Na Kham Mwe", "Na Kam Mui" and "Bo Moustache".
