= Saw Mo Shay =

Karen military officer (1967–2021)

- Military career
- Allegiance: Democratic Karen Benevolent Army
- Rank: General
- Conflicts: Internal conflict in Myanmar: Karen conflict

Saw Mo Shay (Burmese: စောမိုရှေး; 1967 – 21 July 2021) was a Karen insurgent officer and commander-in-chief of DKBA-5, an insurgent group active in Kayin State, Myanmar.

== Biography ==
He was appointed commander-in-chief in an emergency meeting with DKBA-5 commanders, after the original commander-in-chief, Saw La Pwe, died from throat cancer in Bago. Saw Mo Shay was previously the deputy commander-in-chief of DKBA-5.

On 21 July 2021, Saw Mo Shay died of COVID-19 in Yangon.
