= Mahn Nyein Maung =

Karen politician

P'doh Mahn Nyein Maung
- မန်းငြိမ်းမောင်
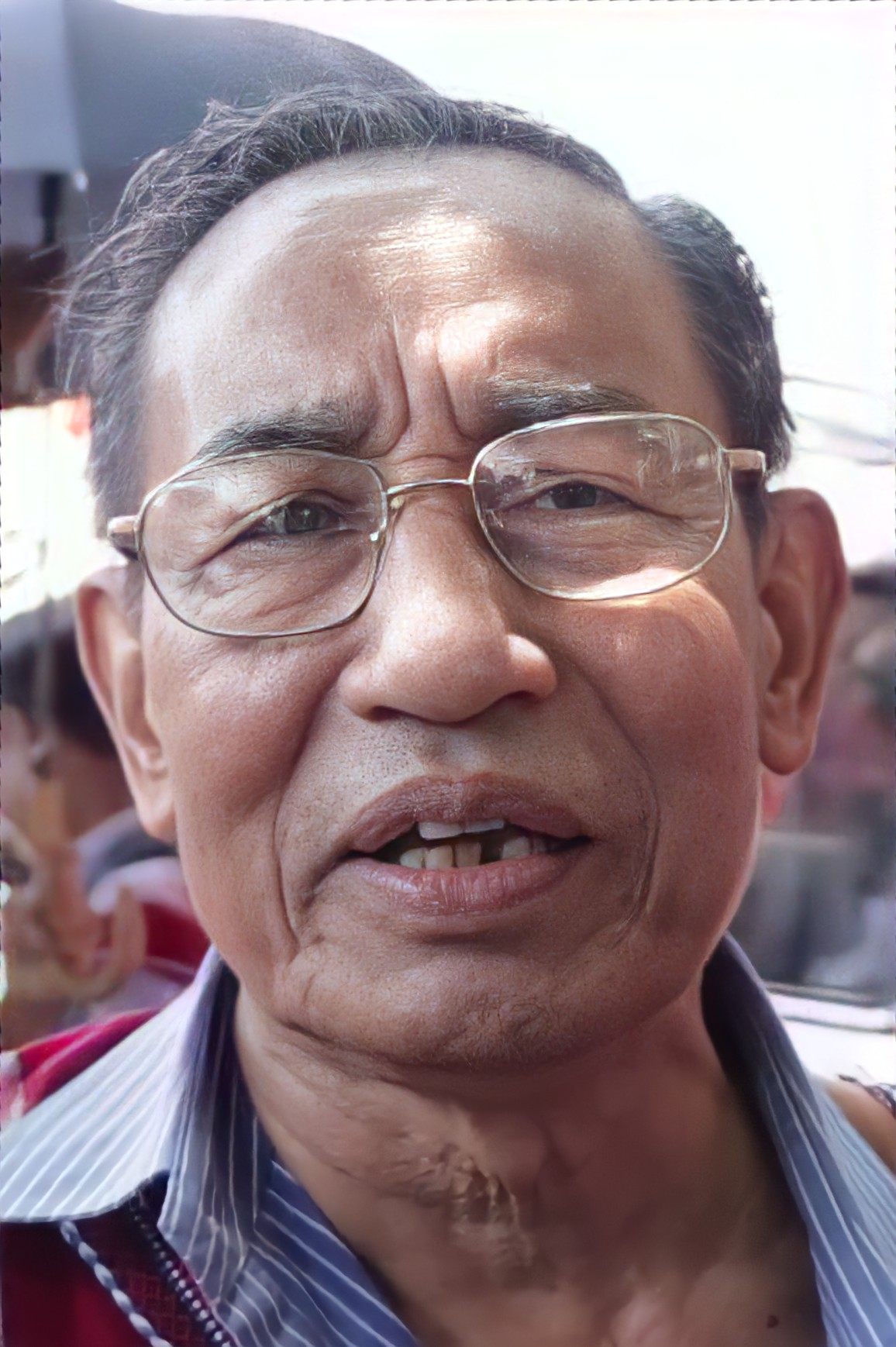
- Mahn Nyein Maung in 2019

Member of the State Administration Council
- In office 2 February 2021 – 31 July 2025

Member of the Karen National Union's Central Executive Committee

Personal details
- Born: c. 1947 (age 78–79) Maungdaw, Rakhine State, Myanmar
- Party: Kayin People's Party (2020–present)
- Other political affiliations: Karen National Union
- Occupation: Politician

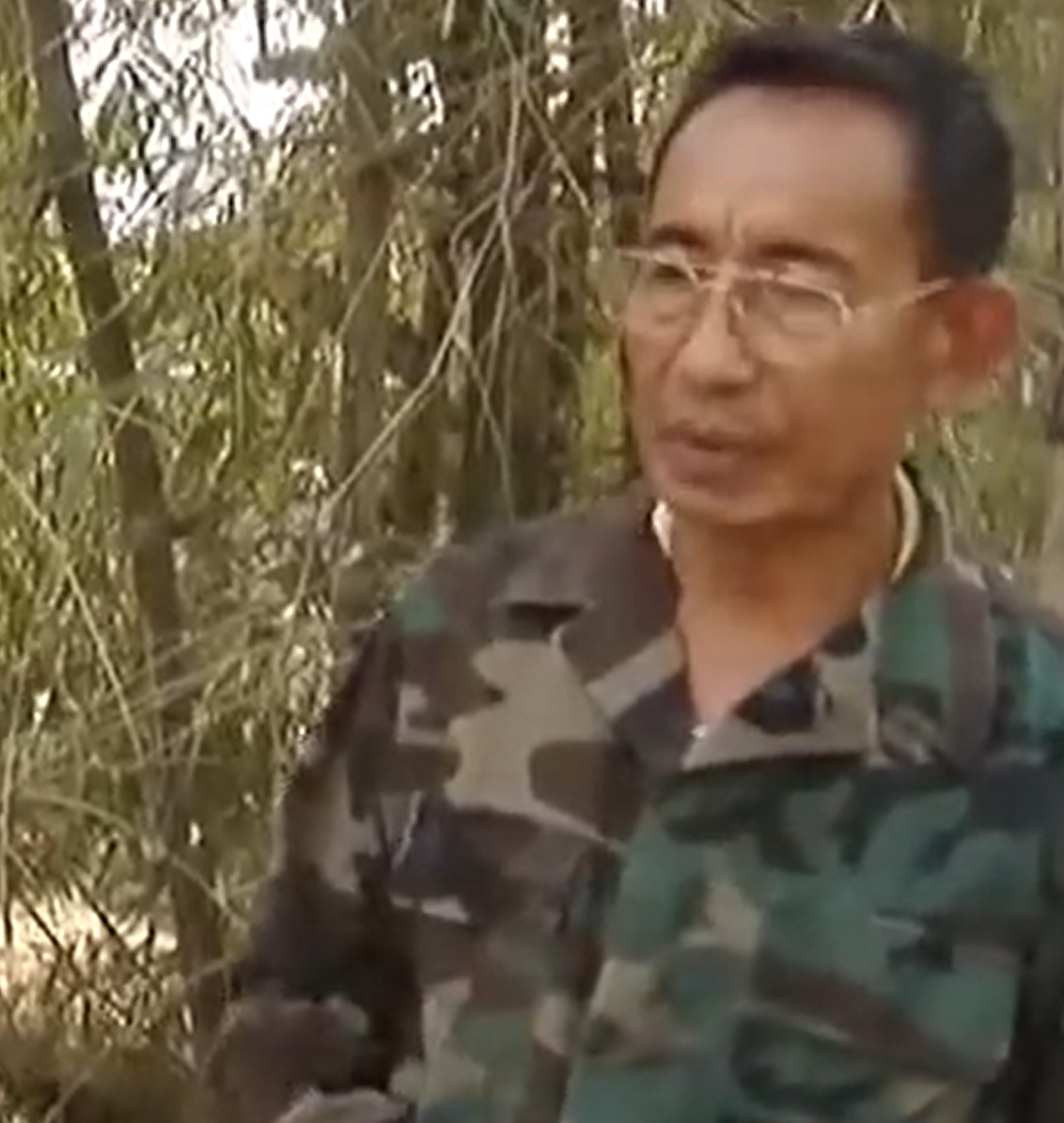
Mahn Nyein Maung after being pardoned by the Myanmar military

P'doh Mahn Nyein Maung (Burmese: ဖဒိုမန်းငြိမ်းမောင်, born c. 1947) is a Karen politician and former rebel leader. He is currently serving as a member of Myanmar's State Administration Council.

Mahn Nyein Maung was born between 1947 and 1949.

== Career ==
=== 1960s–2020: Activism ===
After the 1962 Burmese coup d'état, Mahn Nyein Maung became involved in underground political activism. He was arrested in July 1967 and imprisoned in the Coco Islands. He escaped in 1970. He was recaptured and imprisoned until April 1973, under a general amnesty. During his time in jail, he became acquainted with Mahn Aung Kyi, the secretary of the All Burma Karen Organization, who would become his political mentor.

In 2000, he published a memoir entitled Against the Storm, Across the Sea, describing his prison break from Coco Islands in the 1970s, a feat that earned him the nickname "Burma's Papillon." In December 2011, he was sentenced to 17 years in prison for "unlawful association" after being deported by China due to visa issues. In March 2012, he was sentenced to life in prison for participating in acts of war against the ruling government, but was released on 19 March via presidential amnesty. Mahn Nyein Maung became an admirer of Thein Sein, who had pardoned him. Mahn Nyein Maung participated in negotiating the landmark Nationwide Ceasefire Agreement, which was signed by KNU on 15 October 2015.

=== 2020–present: Entry into politics ===
He resigned from the central executive committee of the Karen National Union in July 2020, in order to contest a Pyithu Hluttaw seat in his hometown of Pantanaw, Ayeyarwady Region in the 2020 Myanmar general election, representing the Kayin People's Party. He lost the election, placing third, with 8.83% of the votes. Nyunt Thein, representing the National League for Democracy, won the race with 58.01% of the votes.

He was appointed as a member of the State Administration Council on 2 February 2021, in the aftermath of the 2021 Myanmar coup d'état. Following his appointment, the KNU distanced itself from Mahn Nyein Maung, and reiterated its opposition to the military coup.
