= DKBA-5 =

Insurgent group in Myanmar

Democratic Karen Benevolent Army
- ဒီမိုကရက်တစ်ကရင်အကျိုးပြုတပ်မတော် - တပ်မဟာ 5
- Recreation of patch used by DKBA-5
- Leaders: Saw Mo Shay (2016–2021); Bo Nat Khann Mway (2010–2016)
- Dates active: 2010–present
- Headquarters: Sonesee Myaing, Myawaddy Township, Myanmar
- Active regions: Kayin State
- Ideology: Karen nationalism Theravada Buddhism
- Size: 3,000
- Wars: the internal conflict in Myanmar
- Flag

The Democratic Karen Benevolent Army (Burmese: ဒီမိုကရက်တစ်ကရင်အကျိုးပြုတပ်မတော်; abbreviated DKBA), also known as the Democratic Karen Buddhist Army - Brigade 5 (Burmese: ဒီမိုကရက်တစ်ကရင်အကျိုးပြုတပ်မတော် - တပ်မဟာ 5; abbreviated DKBA-5) and the Klo Htoo Baw Battalion by the Burmese government, is a Karen Buddhist insurgent group in Myanmar. The group was led by Bo Nat Khann Mway, also known as "Saw Lah Pwe", until his death in 2016.

The DKBA-5 split from the original Democratic Karen Buddhist Army in 2010 and is loosely affiliated with the Karen National Union. They have also worked with the Arakan Army.

== History ==
During the 2010 general election, the DKBA-5 attacked government troops and security forces in Myawaddy Township, Kayin State. The group signed a ceasefire agreement with the government on 3 November 2011, though they did not agreed to disarming, unlike their DKBA predecessors in 2010.

In 2016, a faction of the DKBA-5 led by Bo Bi, sometimes referred to as the "Phawdawmu DKBA", broke away to become a pro-Tatmadaw militia. In 2024 and 2025, the faction has been aiding junta forces in their Operation Aung Zeya offensive, helping to man checkpoints along the Asian Highway 1 and attacking KNLA forces north of Kawkareik.

On World Children's Day 2020, DKBA-5 signed the first Myanmar Joint Action Plan with the United Nations to end recruitment of child soldiers.

In April 2022, 300 DKBA-5 soldiers led by major Bo Salone defected to join the Karen National Defense Organisation after claiming the DKBA-5 was not doing enough to defend the Karen people after the 2021 Myanmar coup. They subsequently became Commando Battalion 1 of the KNDO.

In 2025, the group handed over hundreds of foreigners, who had previously been forced to work in online scams, to authorities in Thailand. In the same year, US authorities sanctioned the DKBA and 4 leaders for allegedly taking an active role in scam operations. KNLA forces later raided a suspected scam compound on November 21; a shootout briefly occurred during the raid.

On 19 November 2026, DKBA leaders, General Saw Shwe Wah and Colonel Saw A One, were sanctioned by the US for allegedly supervising scam operations in Payathonzu.
