= U Thuzana =

Karen Theravadin Buddhist monk (1947–2018)

U Thuzana Myainggyi-ngu Sayadaw
- Title: Sayadaw

Personal life
- Born: 1947 Kayin State, Myanmar
- Died: 13 October 2018 (aged 71) Bumrungrad International Hospital, Bangkok, Thailand
- Occupation: Karen Buddhist monk

Religious life
- Religion: Theravada Buddhism
- Dharma names: Sujana

Senior posting
- Teacher: U Winaya
- Based in: Myaing Gyi Ngu, Kayin State, Myanmar

Thuzana (Burmese: သုဇန; Pali: Sujana), also known as the Myainggyi-ngu Sayadaw (Burmese: မြိုင်ကြီးငူဆရာတော်; 1947 – 18 October 2018), was a Karen Theravada Buddhist monk based in Myaing Gyi Ngu, Kayin State, Myanmar. He was the leader of the Democratic Karen Buddhist Army (DKBA), an ethnic insurgent group, until its dissolution in 2010.

== Career ==
Thuzana was responsible for a 1992 campaign of constructing pagodas in Kayin State and held the title Myaing Gyi Ngu Sayadaw. Thuzana owned a large piece of land in the Myaing Gyi Ngu area and offered it to the IDPs to build houses there. Myaing Gyi Ngu began as a small IDP village, but later expanded to become a town.

Thuzana was formerly a member of the Karen National Union (KNU) until his disagreements with the majority Christian leadership led him to split and create the Democratic Karen Buddhist Army (DKBA) in 1994. Until his death, he wielded considerable influence over the DKBA as well as the Border Guard Force (BGF) it later became.

== Construction of Buddhist buildings ==
Thuzana and his followers drew criticism for their ethno-nationalist views and for building pagodas in close proximity to churches and mosques.

Thuzana sponsored the construction of hundreds of small pagodas along the roads between Myaing Gyi Ngu and the nearby Myanmar–Thailand border. He even had pagodas built on the banks of the Salween River at the border. In his mission to spread Buddhism to all people living in mountainous areas, he also built a monastery in Kayah State.

Before his split with the KNU, Thuzana had a pagoda built in Manerplaw, on the site of the former KNU headquarters. However, General Bo Mya, who was the head of KNU at that time, warned him against painting it white as it could be a visible target for the Tatmadaw (Myanmar Armed Forces). This was the first internal disagreement between Thuzana and rest of the KNU's leadership, which would eventually lead to the split.

== Death ==
Thuzana died on 13 October 2018 at the age of 71 at the Bumrungrad International Hospital in Bangkok, Thailand.
