= Bo Nat Khann Mway =

Karen rebel commander in Myanmar (1962–2016)

- Born: 18 July 1962; Bago, Myanmar
- Died: 13 March 2016 (aged 53); Bago, Myanmar
- Other name: Saw Lah Pwe
- Military career
- Allegiance: DKBA-5 (2011–2016); DKBA (1994–2011); KNLA (1976–1994)
- Service years: 1976–2016
- Rank: Commander-in-chief
- Nicknames: "Bo Moustache", "Mr. Moustache"
- Conflicts: Internal conflict in Myanmar: Karen conflict

Bo Nat Khann Mway (18 July 1962 – 13 March 2016), born Saw Lah Pwe and also known by his nicknames "Bo Moustache" and "Mr. Moustache", was a Karen military officer and commander-in-chief of DKBA-5, an insurgent group in Kayin State, Myanmar (Burma).

Bo Nat Khann Mway joined the Democratic Karen Buddhist Army (DKBA) after its split from the Karen National Liberation Army (KNLA) in 1994. In 2011, five DKBA brigades under the command of Bo Nat Khann Mway split from the group after they rejected the government's plan to convert the DKBA into a border guard force subservient to the Tatmadaw. On 21 August 2010, two of the original five brigades under his command, comprising around 300 troops, integrated themselves into the newly formed border guard force.

Bo Nat Khann Mway died from throat cancer on 13 March 2016, at a hospital in his hometown of Bago (Pegu).
