= Manerplaw =

Manerplaw မၤနၢၤပျီ
- Abandoned village
- Location in Myanmar (Burma)
- Coordinates: 17°43′30″N 97°44′6″E
- Country: Myanmar
- Division: Kayin State
- District: Hpapun District
- Township: Hpapun Township
- Founded: 1975
- Abandoned: 1995

Population (before evacuation)
  - Total: 3,000
- Time zone: UTC+6.30 (MMT)

Manerplaw (S'gaw Karen: မၤနၢၤပျီ; Burmese: မာနယ်ပလော) was a village in Kayin State, Myanmar (Burma), on the Moei River. It was the proposed capital of an independent state governed by the Karen people, known locally as Kawthoolei. Manerplaw was established in 1975 and had a population of around 3,000 in 1992 until its evacuation following military offensives by the government.

The headquarters of several opposition groups were located in Manerplaw, including those of the Karen National Union (KNU), the All Burma Students' Democratic Front (ABSDF), the Democratic Party for a New Society (DPNS), and the National Democratic Front (NDF). The National Coalition Government of the Union of Burma (NCGUB) was established in Manerplaw in December 1990.

Manerplaw was captured and occupied by Tatmadaw and Democratic Karen Buddhist Army (DKBA) troops on 27 January 1995 during the Fall of Manerplaw and later abandoned.

On 17 December 2024, Karen National Union, Karen National Liberation Army (KNLA), and allied forces recaptured Manerplaw from the State Administration Council (SAC) Tatmadaw.
