= Kamamaung =

Kamamaung ကမမောင်း
- Town
- Location within Myanmar (Burma)
- Coordinates: 17°20′49″N 97°39′10″E
- Country: Myanmar
- State: Kayin State
- District: Hpapun District
- Township: Hpapun Township

Area
  - Total: 1.15 sq mi (3.0 km^{2})

Population (2014)
  - Total: 20,895
  - Density: 18,200/sq mi (7,020/km^{2})
- Time zone: UTC+6:30 (MMT)

Kamamaung (Burmese: ကမမောင်းမြို့) is a town in Hpapun Township, Hpapun District, Kayin State of Myanmar. According to 2014 Myanmar Census, the total population in Kamamaung is 20,895.
