= Kawmoora =

Former rebel stronghold in Myanmar

- Stronghold
- Location in Myanmar (Burma)
- Coordinates: 16°47′41″N 98°31′7″E
- Country: Myanmar
- Division: Kayin State
- District: Myawaddy District
- Township: Myawaddy Township
- Time zone: UTC+6.30 (MMT)

Kawmoora (S'gaw Karen: ကီၢ်မူရၤ; Burmese: ကော့မူးရာ) was a stronghold of the rebel Karen National Liberation Army, the armed wing of the Karen National Union. It was located on a large sandbank linked to Myanmar through a narrow strip of land fortified by a 50-metre (160 ft)-long border wall. Kawmoora was completely surrounded by Thailand.

The Tatmadaw (Myanmar Armed Forces) captured Kawmoora on 21 February 1995.
