= Paul Kenny (photographer) =

British photographer

Paul Kenny (born 16 July 1951) is a British artist/photographer who makes abstract still-life images and lives in Newcastle upon Tyne. He has published the books Seaworks (2014) and O Hanami (2019) and Strandline (2024). His work is held in the collections of the Scottish National Portrait Gallery and Victoria and Albert Museum, and he has had solo exhibitions at Harris Museum, Art Gallery in Preston and at Atkinson Art Gallery and Library in Southport.

== Early life and education ==
Kenny was born and grew up in Salford. He earned a Pre Diploma from Salford College of Art and Technology (1971/72) and a Degree in Fine Art in Newcastle (1972–75).

== Work ==
"Working without a camera, Kenny creates small plates or slides laden with objects found on his wanderings – leaves, flowers, shells and rocks. Each plate is then scanned to produce abstract large-scale photographs rich with opalescent colours, which take on the form of imagined landscapes."

== Personal life ==
Kenny's partner, Margaret Kenny, is also an artist and they have two children.

== Publications ==
- Seaworks: 1998–2013. Triplekite, 2014. ISBN 978-0957634534.
- O Hanami: the Celebration of Transient Beauty. Kozu, 2019. With a foreword by Francis Hodgson.

== Collections ==
Kenny's work is held in the following permanent collections:

- Scottish National Photography Collection, Scottish National Portrait Gallery / National Galleries of Scotland, Edinburgh: 22 works (as of July 2021)
- Victoria and Albert Museum, London: 1 print (as of June 2025)

== Exhibitions ==
=== Solo exhibitions ===
- Harris Museum, Art Gallery, Preston, UK, 2001
- Paul Kenny: Seaworks, Atkinson Art Gallery and Library, Southport, 2021

=== Group exhibitions ===
- Expect the Unexpected, The Lowry, Salford, 2019. With work by Kenny, Mark Bloomfield, Greig Burgoyne, Joel Goodman, Yoko Ono, Eugenie Scrase, Sarah Sze, Merel Theloesen, Keith Tyson, and Gillian Wearing.
