= Hpapun District =

District in Kayin State, Myanmar

Coordinates: 18°04′36″N 97°22′07″E

Hpapun District (Phlone ဖါပံင်ခြိုင့်; Burmese: ဖာပွန်ခရိုင်) or Mutraw District (S'gaw Karen: မူထြီကီၢ်ရ့ၣ်) is a district of the Karen State in Myanmar. Area 6.722,5 km2. The principal town is Hpapun. According to 2014 Myanmar Census, the total population in Hpapun District is 35,085.

Location in Kayin State

== Townships and towns ==
The district contains the following townships and towns:

- Hpapun Township
  - Hpapun
  - Kamamaung
