= Paul D. Kenny =

Irish political scientist

- Born: Ireland
- Awards: Robert A. Dahl Award (2018)

Academic background
- Education: Belvedere College
- Alma mater: Trinity College Dublin; London School of Economics; Yale University
- Thesis: The Patronage Network: Broker Power, Populism, and Democracy (2013)

Academic work
- School or tradition: Comparative politics; Political sociology; International relations; Political theory; Economics
- Institutions: Trinity College Dublin; Australian National University; Australian Catholic University
- Main interests: Comparative politics; Political corruption; Theories of political behavior; International relations; Populism; Politics of India; Xenophobia; Ethnocentrism
- Website: Paul D Kenny

Paul David Kenny is an Irish political scientist and author who specialises in comparative politics and political economics.

== Education ==
Kenny attended Belvedere College, a private voluntary secondary school in Dublin. He proceeded to Trinity College Dublin in 2000, where he studied economics, graduating with first-class honours in 2004, and then attended the London School of Economics from 2005 to 2006, where he received an MSc in international relations and affairs. From 2006 to 2012, he attended Yale University, gaining an MA, MPhil, and PhD in political science. His PhD thesis was titled The Patronage Network: Broker Power, Populism, and Democracy.

== Career ==
Kenny joined the Australian National University in 2013: from July 2013 to December 2017, he was a research fellow in Indian Political and Social Change, then from August 2019 to July 2020, he was an associate professor.

Kenny's research on populism, corruption, and political institutions has been published in many international peer-reviewed journals, including the International Studies Review, the Journal of Refugee Studies, British Journal of Political Science, Government and Opposition, The Journal of Politics, Political Research Quarterly, the Journal of Ethnic and Migration Studies, and the Journal of East Asian Studies.

In 2017, Kenny explored the micro-foundations of populism in his book Populism and Patronage: Why Populists Win Elections in India, Asia, and Beyond with Oxford University Press, which won the 2018 Robert A. Dahl Award. He wrote two books with Cambridge University Press (Populism in Southeast Asia in 2018 and Why Populism? Political Strategy from Ancient Greece to the Present in 2023), exploring his belief that populism is best understood "less as a political ideology than as a cost-effective political strategy."

Since July 2020, Kenny has held the post of Professor of Political Science at the Australian Catholic University. He is head of the Department of Political & Social Change.

In May 2023, Kenny moderated Mapping Global Populism — Panel 2: Populism, Macho-Fascism and Varieties of Illiberalism in The Philippines, a European Center for Populism Studies panel, with speakers Adele Webb, Mark R. Thompson, Jean S. Encinas-Franco, Jefferson Lyndon D. Ragragio.

== Selected works ==
=== Books ===
- Kenny, Paul D. (28 September 2017). Populism and Patronage: Why Populists Win Elections in India, Asia, and Beyond. Oxford University Press. ISBN 9780191845673.
- Kenny, Paul D. (27 November 2018). Populism in Southeast Asia. Elements in Politics and Society in Southeast Asia. Cambridge University Press. ISBN 9781108563772.
- Kenny, Paul (March 2023). Why Populism? Political Strategy from Ancient Greece to the Present. Cambridge University Press. ISBN 9781009275262.

=== Journal articles ===
- Kenny, Paul D. (April 2010). "The Meaning of Torture". Polity. 42 (2): 131–155. doi:10.1057/pol.2009.21.
- Kenny, Paul D. (December 2010). "Structural Integrity and Cohesion in Insurgent Organizations: Evidence from Protracted Conflicts in Ireland and Burma". International Studies Review. 12 (4): 533–555. doi:10.1111/j.1468-2486.2010.00959.x.11 June 2023
- Kenny, Paul D.; Lockwood-Kenny, Kate (June 2011). "A Mixed Blessing: Karen Resettlement to the United States Get access Arrow". Journal of Refugee Studies. 24 (2): 217–238. doi:10.1093/jrs/fer009.
- Kenny, Paul D. (January 2015). "The origins of patronage politics: State building, centrifugalism, and decolonization". British Journal of Political Science. 45 (1): 141–171. doi:10.1017/S000712341300015X.
- Kenny, Paul D.; Houle, Christian (April 2018). "The Political and Economic Consequences of Populist Rule in Latin America". Government and Opposition. 53 (2): 256–287. doi:10.1017/gov.2016.25.
- Kenny, Paul D.; Houle, Christian; Park, Chunho (January 2019). "The structure of ethnic inequality and ethnic voting". The Journal of Politics. 81 (1): 187–200. doi:10.1086/700200. hdl:1885/164304.
- Kenny, Paul D. (January 2019). ""The Enemy of the People": Populists and Press Freedom". Political Research Quarterly. 73 (2): 261–275. doi:10.1177/1065912918824038.
- Kenny, Paul D.; Miller, Charles (June 2020). "Does asylum seeker immigration increase support for the far right? Evidence from the United Kingdom, 2000-2015". Journal of Ethnic and Migration Studies. 48 (4): 1629–1646. doi:10.1080/1369183X.2020.1776596.
- Kenny, Paul D.; Holmes, Ronald (July 2020). "A New Penal Populism? Rodrigo Duterte, Public Opinion, and the War on Drugs in the Philippines". Journal of East Asian Studies. 20 (2): 187–205. doi:10.1017/jea.2020.8.
