= Hpapun Township =

Coordinates: 18°00′00″N 97°34′00″E

Hpapun Township ဖာပွန်မြို့နယ် ဖးဖူကီၢ်ဆၣ်
- Township
- Location in Kayin State
- Country: Myanmar
- State: Kayin State
- District: Hpapun District
- Capital: Hpapun

Population (2023)
  - Total: 123,985
  - Ethnicities: Karen; Shan; Bamar
  - Religion: Buddhism; Christianity
- Time zone: UTC+6:30 (MMT)

Hpapun Township (Burmese: ဖာပွန်မြို့နယ်, MLCTS: hpa.pwan.mrui.nay; Pwo Eastern Karen: ဖာပံင်ကၞင့်; S'gaw Karen: ဖးဖူကီၢ်ဆၣ်; also spelt Papun Township and known by the Karen people as Mutraw or Bu Tho Township) is a township of Hpapun District in the Karen State of Myanmar. It lies on the border of Thailand across the Salween River. The central part of the township is bounded on the west by the Yunzalin River.

The township is home to two towns with a total of eight urban wards as well as 33 village tracts grouping 305 villages. The principal town is Papun and the only other town in the township is Kamamaung. 67% of the township professes Buddhism as their faith with 27% professing Christianity.
