= Karen National Union =

Karen National Union ကရင် အမျိုးသား အစည်းအရုံး
- Abbreviation: KNU
- Chairperson: Padoh Saw Kwe Htoo Win
- Secretary-General: Padoh Saw Thadaw Moo; P'doh Saw Thaw Thi Bweh; Padoh Saw Hla Tun
- Spokesperson: Padoh Saw Taw Nee
- Vice chair: P'doh Saw Hser Gay
- Founded: 5 February 1947
- Headquarters: Klo Yaw Lay Manerplaw (until 1995)
- Armed wing: KNLA, KNDO
- Ideology: Current: Karen nationalism; Self-determination; Federalism; Historical: Kawthoolei separatism
- Religion: Christianity; Buddhism
- National affiliation: National Unity Consultative Council
- Slogan: "Give me liberty or give me death!"
- Anthem: "Dear Our People"

Party flag

Website
- knuhq.org

The Karen National Union (Burmese: ကရင် အမျိုးသား အစည်းအရုံး; abbreviated KNU) is a political organisation with an armed wing, the Karen National Liberation Army (KNLA), that represents the Karen people of Myanmar. It operates in mountainous eastern Myanmar and has underground networks in other areas of Myanmar where Karen people live as a minority group.

Some of the Karen, led primarily by the Karen National Union (KNU), have waged a war against the central government since early 1949. The aim of the KNU at first was independence. Since 1976, the armed group has called for a federal system rather than an independent Karen State.

The Karen conflict is the second longest internal war in the world after the Dagohoy rebellion in the Philippines, having been waged for 85 years until 1829.

In 2025, the Myanmar military junta designated the KNU as a terrorist organization.

== History ==
=== 1947–1959 ===
The KNU was founded in 1947. Following Myanmar's independence in January 1948, KNU leaders instructed local organisers to establish local defence militias, collectively grouped under the Karen National Defence Organisation in their districts. The KNU launched its armed campaign against the Myanma government in early 1949.

By the early 1950s, factions within Karen politics were influencing the strategic posture of the KNU. In 1953, Mahn Ba Zan and other KNU leaders established the Karen National Unity Party (KNUP), a communist-influenced group that supported a shift leftward in KNU politics.

=== 1960–1969 ===
By 1960, KNUP members had become the dominant figures within KNU structures, despite the KNUP being a "minority" tendency within Karen politics, as described by Paul D. Kenny. The KNUP was strongest in the Irrawaddy Delta.

Under KNUP influence, the KNU was centralised, the KNLA was reorganised along Maoist lines, and agricultural cooperatives were created in some KNU-controlled villages.

By 1963, the KNU numbered approximately 10,000.

As the KNU trended leftward internally, its outward posture was complicated by the broader alignment of forces within Myanmar. Chinese support for the Communist Party of Burma, a rival of the KNU-led the organisation into a tacit understanding with the Kuomintang, which had been displaced into northern Myanmar following defeat in the Chinese Civil War.

Ideological and strategic disagreement precipitated the breaking away of senior figure Tha Hmwe in April 1963, with approximately 400 men, to found the Karen Revolutionary Council (KRC). The KRC was wound up following Tha Hmwe's capture in 1964.

In KNU-controlled territory along the Thai border, a more successful reaction against the KNUP influence within the KNU took place. These areas, at some distance from KNUP strength in the Irrawaddy Delta, had come under the sway of S'gaw Karen figures, especially commanders Shwe Hser and Bo Mya.

In 1966, Bo Mya—then head of the Karen Armed Forces Eastern Division—seized control of the Dawna Range and much of the Thai border region and ordered KNUP cadres to leave his territory. Bo Mya was able to maintain an army of approximately 10,000 men by taxing illegal trade along the border with Thailand.

In 1967, Mahn Ba Zan and four other senior KNUP officials reconciled with Bo Mya, forming the Karen National Unity Front (KNUF). This reconciliation paved the way for Bo Mya's ultimate ascension to KNU presidency in 1976.

=== 1970–1999 ===
By 1970, following KNUP military defeats in the Irrawaddy Delta, the KNU had become the dominant representative body for the Karen Movement.

The 9th KNU congress was held in September 1974, and the 11th KNU congress was held in 1995.

Bo Mya dominated the KNU leadership for three decades from 1976 to 2000. For many years, the KNU was able to fund its activities by controlling black market trade across the border with Thailand, and through local taxation. After the failed 8888 Uprising of the Myanmar people in 1988, the Myanmar military government turned to China for help in consolidating its power. Various economic concessions were offered to China in exchange for weapons. The Myanmar Army was massively expanded and began to offer deals to groups fighting the government. The groups were offered the choice of cooperating with the military junta or being destroyed.

In 1994, a group of Buddhist soldiers in the KNLA, citing discrimination by the KNU's overwhelmingly Christian leadership against the Buddhist Karen majority, broke away and established the Democratic Karen Buddhist Army (DKBA). They were led by U Thuzana, an influential Karen monk. The DKBA quickly agreed to a ceasefire with the Myanmar army and was granted business concessions at the expense of the KNU. The KNU and DKBA have since been in regular fighting, with the DKBA actively supported by the Myanmar army.

The KNU's effectiveness was severely diminished after its headquarters were captured in the Fall of Manerplaw, near the Thai border, in 1995.

=== 2000–2009 ===
The 12th KNU congress was held in 2000, the 13th KNU congress was held from 12 to 16 December 2005, and the 14th KNU congress was held from 6 to 20 October 2008.

Padoh Mahn Sha La Phan, the secretary-general of the union, was shot dead in his home in Mae Sot, Thailand, on 14 February 2008, possibly by soldiers of the DKBA.

In 2009, the KNU's fighting force was reduced to around 3000 to 5000 soldiers, and on 25 June 2009 the KNLA's Brigade 7 headquarters was overrun.

=== 2010–present ===
On 2 November 2010, the Karen National Union became a member of an alliance which included the Karenni National Progressive Party (KNPP), the Chin National Front (CNF), the Kachin Independence Organisation (KIO), the New Mon State Party (NMSP) and the Shan State Army North (SSA-N).

In January 2012, Myanmar's military-backed civilian government signed a ceasefire deal with the KNU in Hpa-an, the capital of eastern Kayin State. Aung Min, the Railway Minister, and General Mutu Sae Poe of the KNU led the peace talks.

In March 2012, a senior political leader of KNU, P'doh Mahn Nyein Maung, was found guilty of high treason under the Illegal Association Act, for his involvement with the Karen rebellion and sentenced to 20 years. He was freed soon afterward and sent back to Thailand.

The Karen National Union held its 15th congress at Lay Wah on 26 November 2012. This meeting was held at a pivotal moment in the KNU's history, as it occurred at a time of political in-fighting in regards to how the KNU should negotiate a ceasefire agreement with the Myanmar government.

From 30 October to 2 November 2013, an unprecedented meeting took place at the Kachin Independence Organisation headquarters in Laiza. For the first time, representatives of 17 armed ethnic opposition groups were able to meet in Myanmar with the consent of the government. The conference resulted in the formation of a 13-member Nationwide Ceasefire Coordinating Team (NCCT) and the signing of an "11-Point Common Position of Ethnic Resistance Organisations on Nationwide Ceasefire" or the Laiza Agreement. The NCCT's current mandate was to take responsibility on writing the Nationwide Ceasefire Agreement based on mutual understanding between the different armed groups in the NCCT. At the Law Khee Lah Conference, it was agreed that the NCCT had the mandate to discuss and change the document technically, except at the policy level. When the final document was ready, the respective ethnic organisation leaders decided and discussed with the Union Peacemaking Working Committee (UPWC) on the nationwide ceasefire.

On 15 October 2015, the KNU signed the Nationwide Ceasefire Agreement (NCA) with the government of Myanmar, along with several other insurgent groups.

In September 2016, KNLA fighters began clashing with members of the Mon National Liberation Army (MNLA), the armed wing of the New Mon State Party (NMSP), in the Tanintharyi Region. Both the KNU and NMSP were signatories of the Nationwide Ceasefire Agreement (NCA) at the time of the fighting. A temporary bilateral truce was reached between the two groups on 14 March 2018.

Tensions between the KNU and the Tatmadaw increased as unrest swept the country following the 2021 Myanmar coup d'état. On 27 March 2021, KNU Brigade 5 overran a Myanmar Army base near the Thai border, killing ten soldiers including a deputy battalion commander. The Myanmar army launched multiple airstrikes on Karen villages in retaliation. In 2021, KNU became a member of the National Unity Consultative Council.

Following the coup, the KNU launched an investigation on Nerdah Bo Mya, a commander of the Karen National Defence Organisation (KNDO), the KNU's other main armed wing, for his role in the extrajudicial execution of 25 men. He refused to cooperate with the investigation and instead formed a splinter group, the Kawthoolei Army. The Kawthoolei Army has since banded with two resistance units, the Venom Commando and the Lion Battalion, both of which had previously been supervised by the KNLA's Brigade 6.

According to the Thai-based Institute for Strategy and Policy- Myanmar research group, the KNU control approximately 61% of Karen State and 1/3 of the Thailand-Myanmar border as of 15 July 2025. The KNU disputes this claim by asserting that they control 90% of the border area.

On 28 August 2025, the State Security and Peace Commission Ministry of Home Affairs declared the KNU as an unlawful association and its Counter-Terrorism Central Committee designated the KNU as terrorist group.

On 14 November 2025, the KNU and its allied forces recaptured the Myanmar–Thai border town of Mawdaung at the Singkhon Pass, reclaiming the area for the first time since its seizure by the junta in 1990.

On 30 March 2026, the KNU joined the newly-formed Steering Council for the Emergence of a Federal Democratic Union (SCEF) with the Kachin Independence Organisation, Chin National Front, Karenni State Interim Executive Council, National Unity Government, and the Committee Representing Pyidaungsu Hluttaw.

== Conditions of ceasefire ==
The group announced it will never enter into ceasefire talks with the military unless three conditions are met:

1. The military must agree to leave politics completely.
2. The military must face justice during the transition period – junta chief Senior General Min Aung Hlaing should not get immunity for the offenses they committed.
3. The military must accept a new constitution that is suitable for the establishment of a federal democratic union.

== Leadership ==
The Karen National Union leadership is a democratically elected body with individuals elected at a four-yearly congress. The KNU Congress is recognised as the KNU's supreme legislative body and it is here that the President, vice-president, General Secretary, Joint Secretaries 1 and 2 and the Central Executive Committee (CEC), the Central Standing Committees (CSC) and candidate members are elected. The seven KNU districts are responsible for electing their own District Chairmen and District Standing Committee leaders every two years. As the District Chairmen and Brigade Commanders are elected at local levels, they are automatically appointed as Central Standing Committee Members. The District Chairmen and Brigade Commanders, together with nominated District Standing Committee Members attend the KNU congresses. In addition, elected Central Standing Committee members would provide the ministers for 14 departments, including Culture, Defence, Education, Forestry, Foreign Affairs, Health, and Mining. The CEC comprises eleven members responsible for the day-to-day running of the KNU. The CSC meets annually when issues arise that directly affect the KNU policies and/or the existence of the KNU organisation, the CEC will call a CSC Emergency Meeting.

Additionally, the Foreign Affairs Department appoints KNU representatives. These representatives are based among the Karen communities who support KNU's political goals and objectives in their respective countries.

The incumbent leaders elected at the 15th KNU Congress are:

Central Executive Committee

- Chairperson: P'doh Saw Kwe Htoo Win
- Vice-chairperson: P'doh Saw Hser Ghay
- General Secretary: P'doh Ta Doh Moo
- First Secretary: P'doh Saw Thaw Thi Bwe
- Second Secretary: P'doh Saw La Htun
- Other CEC members: General Saw Johny, Lieutenant General Saw Ta Mla Thaw, P'doh Naw Dah Dah, P'doh Saw Law Eh Moo, P'doh Saw Taw Nee, P' doh Saw Eh K'lu Say

Department heads:

- Head of the Agriculture Department: P'doh Saw Lay Say
- Head of the Alliance Affairs Department: P'doh Mahn Nyne Maung
- Head of the Breeding and Fishery Department: P'doh Saw Mya Maung
- Head of the Defense Department: Lt. Col. Saw Roger Khin
- Head of the Education and Culture Department: P'doh Saw Lah Say
- Head of the Finance and Revenue Department: P'doh Saw Thaw Thi
- Head of the Forestry Department: P'doh Mahn Ba Tun
- Head of the Foreign Affairs Department: P'doh Saw Tony
- Head of the Health and Welfare Department: P'doh Saw Eh Kalu Shwe Oo
- Head of the Interior and Religion Department: P'doh Saw Ah Toe
- Head of the Organisation and Information Department: P'doh Saw Hla Tun
- Head of the Justice Department: P'doh Naw Myne Poe
- Head of the Mining Department: P'doh Saw Ker Ler
- Head of the Transportation and Communication Department: P'doh Saw Kawkasar Nay Soe
