= Karen National Liberation Army =

Military organization in Myanmar

- ကရင်အမျိုးသား လွတ်မြောက်ရေး တပ်မတော်
- Flag of the Karen National Liberation Army
- Leader: GOC Saw Baw Kyaw Heh
- Dates active: 1949 – present
- Headquarters: Lay Wah; Manerplaw (until 1995)
- Active regions: Kayah State; Kayin State; Tanintharyi Region; Bago Region; Mon State; Myanmar-Thailand border
- Ideology: Karen nationalism Self-determination; Federalism
- Part of: Karen National Union
- Wars: the Internal conflict in Myanmar

The Karen National Liberation Army (Burmese: ကရင်အမျိုးသား လွတ်မြောက်ရေးတပ်မတော်; abbreviated KNLA) is the military branch of the Karen National Union (KNU), which campaigns for the self-determination of the Karen people of Myanmar (formerly Burma). The KNLA has been fighting the Burmese government since the 1960s as part of the Karen conflict, which has been ongoing since 1949.

The KNLA was reported to have had a strength of approximately 10,000 in 1970, 20,000 in 1980, 3,000 in 2001, 5,000 in 2006, 6,000 in 2012, and 7,000 in 2014. As of early 2021, the KNLA is estimated to have around 15,000 troops. The army is divided into seven brigades and a 'Special Force' reserved for special operations.

== History ==
=== Background ===
At the time of Burmese independence from the British in 1948, there was considerable tension between the Karen community and the Burmese majority. Some Karens sought independence while others attempted co-existence within Burma. The KNLA was preceded by the Karen National Defence Organisation (KNDO), an armed organisation formed by the KNU in 1947 to defend Karen communities and interests. Most KNDO soldiers had previously served in the forces of British Burma.

In early 1949, the Burmese government arrested the ethnically Karen leader of the armed forces, Gen. Smith Dun, and replaced him with Burmese nationalist Ne Win. Continued attacks against Karen dominated townships around Rangoon and the arrest of Karen political leaders led the KNU to declare armed struggle, and the world's longest running civil war began.

Early in the fighting, Karen forces overran much of northern Burma including towns such as Mandalay and established strong positions outside Rangoon at Insein Township. But lacking a port from which to receive military supplies, the Karen forces gradually withdrew to the southeast of Burma.

=== Founding of the KNLA ===
In 1967, the Karen National United Party began to change its approach to the war, withdrawing more from the Irrawaddy delta and, in 1976, changing its policy on wanting an independent state, and joining a new alliance, the National Democratic Front. This alliance of armed ethnic political parties supported a federal union of Burma. Around this time, the Karen National Liberation Council was formed as a new emergency administration by the KNU, which then founded the Karen National Liberation Army.

In 1970, the KNLA was reorganized into 7 brigades and additional special battalions under the personal command of Bo Mya. These units combined KNLA soldiers with local KNDO militias in each brigade's territory, quickly growing the size of the KNLA to 10,000 well-armed and experienced soldiers.

=== 1990–2010 ===
In 1994, a group of Buddhist soldiers in the KNLA, claiming that the KNLA was unfairly dominated by Christians, broke away from the KNLA to form a new force, the DKBA, which soon organised a cease-fire with the Burmese military government.

In 1995 KNLA lost Kawmoora and Myawaddy to the DKBA. This considerably reduced the KNLA's border trade taxation.

A group calling itself the KNU/KNLA Peace Council, led by the former KNLA brigade 7 commander Brig-Gen Htay Maung (Htein Maung), broke away from the KNLA in February 2007, and organised a peace talk as well as a cease-fire agreement with the Burmese military government without the approval of the KNU central committee.

On 14 February 2008, Padoh Mahn Sha Lah Phan, the KNU secretary-general, was assassinated in Thailand.

On 13 May 2009, a senior Myanmar Army officer, Brig.-Gen. Kaung Myat was killed by the KNLA. He had been the commander of the No. 5 Military Operations Command. The next month, on 19 June, DKBA soldiers began attacking the KNLA Brigade 7 headquarters, which they then captured on 23 June.

=== 2010–present ===
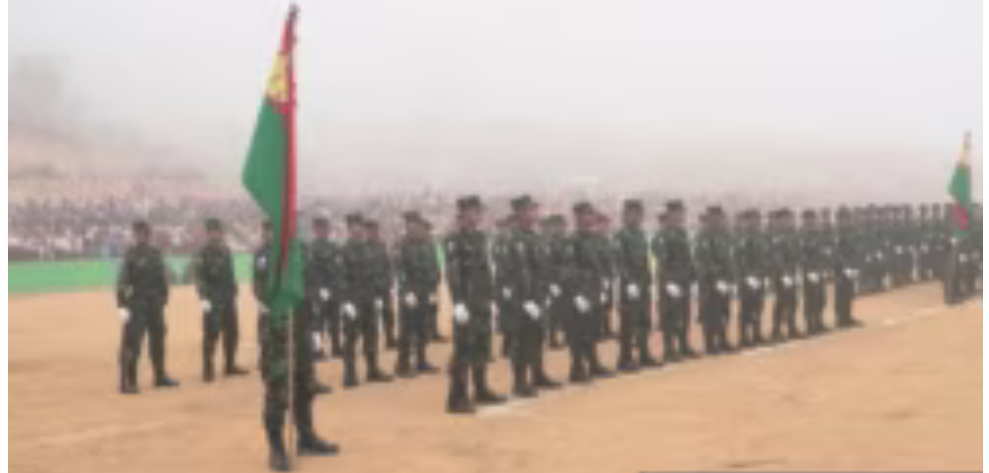
Karen National Liberation Army during the Karen Revolution day on 31 January 2019

During 2010, increasing numbers of Democratic Karen Buddhist Army (DKBA) soldiers defected to the KNLA, or fled to Thailand, following the announcement that the DKBA would be absorbed into the Burmese military government's Border Guard. The DKBA had previously been allied to, but distinct from, government forces.

In November 2010, following the general election of 2010, large parts of the Democratic Karen Buddhist Army are alleged to have mutinied and re-aligned themselves with the KNLA, resulting in the escalating conflict with junta troops. The two rebel armies have formed an alliance in advance of a possible crackdown by the military government.

The KNLA, along with its parent organisation the KNU, signed the Nationwide Ceasefire Agreement (NCA) with the government of Myanmar on 15 October 2015, along with several other insurgent groups.

In September 2016, KNLA fighters began clashing with members of the Mon National Liberation Army (MNLA), the armed wing of the New Mon State Party (NMSP), in the Tanintharyi Region. Both the KNU and NMSP were signatories of the Nationwide Ceasefire Agreement (NCA) at the time of the fighting. A temporary bilateral truce was reached between the two groups on 14 March 2018.

Tensions between the KNU and the Tatmadaw increased as unrest swept the country following the 2021 Myanmar coup d'état. On 27 March 2021, KNLA Brigade 5 overran a Myanmar Army base near the Thai border, killing 10 soldiers including a deputy battalion commander. The Myanmar army launched multiple airstrikes on Karen villages in retaliation.

On 27 April 2021, the KNLA captured a Myanmar Army base along the Salween River, bordering Thailand's Mae Sam Laep sub-district. A civilian on the Thai side of the border was wounded by a stray bullet during the battle.

On 9 September 2021, KNLA Brigades 3 and 5 captured a Myanmar Army camp in Kyaukkyi Township in Bago Region.

On 21 November 2025, KNLA forces raided a suspected scam compound guarded by the Democratic Karen Benevolent Army. 2,000 foreign nationals were detained, with hundreds handed off to Thai authorities. KNU officials called for international cooperation against fraud factories.

== Volunteers ==
=== Foreign volunteers ===
A number of foreigners have gone to Myanmar to fight for the KNLA the war volunteers consisted of representatives from various countries such as French, Japanese, American, Thai. Dave Everett, a former Australian SAS soldier, fought for the KNLA and was later arrested in Australia for trying to steal money to fund the KNLA. Des Ball, a professor at ANU, has advised them on military strategy.

=== Muslim volunteers ===
After anti-Muslim riots flared in Mawlamyine, Mon State in August 1983, refugees formed the Kawthoolei Muslim Liberation Front. According to CIA reports, the SLORC military regime accused the KMLF of killing residents of Yangon's Kyimyindaing Township in November 1983 and July 1984. Fraction between Sunni and Shia sects led to the formation of the All Burma Muslim Liberation Army in 1985. The ABMLA fought against the military regime in Tanintharyi Region until the two factions merged into the KNLA 3rd Company in 2015.

== Equipment ==
Former flag of the KNLA (2006–2021), sometimes used on current uniforms with shoulder sleeve insignias

KNLA soldiers are issued M-16 rifles from the Vietnam War era, and also AK-47s. They also have used RPG-7s, M-203 grenade launchers, M-79 grenade launchers and mortars. Some KNLA soldiers have used World War II-era M-1 carbines. The KNLA has also used captured weapons from the Tatmadaw.

Some KNLA forces were spotted with Chinese HN-5 MANPADS in March 2024.

KNLA troops wear uniforms similar to Thai Army woodland camouflage.

== Kawthoolei KNLA command structure ==
KNLA operates 7 brigades in Kawthoolei areas. Each brigade has several battalions, as shown below.

1st brigade operated in Doothahtu district

- 1st Infantry battalion
- 2nd Infantry battalion
- 3rd Infantry battalion
- 1st KNDO battalion

2nd brigade operated in Tawoo district

- 4th Infantry battalion
- 5th Infantry battalion
- 6th Infantry battalion
- 2nd KNDO battalion

3rd brigade operated in Klerlweehtu district

- 7th Infantry battalion
- 8th Infantry battalion
- 9th Infantry battalion
- 3rd KNDO battalion

4th brigade operated in Dawei district

- 10th Infantry battalion
- 11th Infantry battalion
- 12th Infantry battalion
- 203rd Infantry battalion (special battalion)
- 4th KNDO battalion

5th brigade operated in Mutraw district

- 13th Infantry battalion
- 14th Infantry battalion
- 15th Infantry battalion
- 102nd Infantry battalion (special battalion)
- 5th KNDO battalion

6th brigade operated in Dooplaya district

- 16th Infantry battalion
- 17th Infantry battalion
- 18th Infantry battalion
- 27th Infantry battalion
- 103rd Infantry battalion (special battalion)
- 201st Infantry battalion (special battalion)
- 6th KNDO battalion
- 8th KNDO battalion

7th brigade operated in Hpa-an district

- 19th Infantry battalion
- 20th Infantry battalion
- 21st Infantry battalion
- 22nd Infantry battalion
- 24th Infantry battalion
- 101st Infantry battalion (special battalion)
- 202nd Infantry battalion (special battalion)
- 7th KNDO battalion
- 9th KNDO Security Battalion - KNDO Headquarters

== Notable people ==
- Masaki Takabe, Japanese
- Jean-Philippe Courreges, French (died in 1987)
- Olivier Thiriat, French (died in 1989)
- Guillaume Oillic, French (died in 1990)
- Dave Everett, Australian former SASR
- Geeson Beeson, French
- Alain Bambo, French
