= Democratic Karen Buddhist Army =

Former insurgent group in Myanmar

- တိုးတက်သော ဗုဒ္ဓဘာသာ ကရင်အမျိုးသား တပ်ဖွဲ့
- Leader: U Thuzana
- Dates active: 1994–2009 (As DKBA); 2009–2024 (As BGF)
- Active regions: Kayin State, Myanmar
- Ideology: Karen nationalism Theravāda Buddhism
- Size: 6,000
- Part of: Border Guard Forces (in part)
- Wars: the Internal conflict in Myanmar

The Democratic Karen Buddhist Army (DKBA; Burmese: တိုးတက်သော ဗုဒ္ဓဘာသာ ကရင်အမျိုးသား တပ်ဖွဲ့) was an insurgent group of Buddhist soldiers and officers in Myanmar that split from the predominantly Christian-led Karen National Liberation Army (KNLA), one of the largest rebel factions in Myanmar. Shortly after splitting from the KNLA in December 1994, the DKBA signed a ceasefire agreement with the government of Myanmar in exchange for military and financial assistance; provided that it supported government offensives against the KNU (the political wing of the KNLA) and its allies.

In 2009, the DKBA officially joined the Burmese Army as a Border Guard Force. The DKBA (known officially as the Karen Border Guard Force) worked primarily as an auxiliary force in Kayin State for the next 13 years until 2024, when tensions with the ruling military junta of Myanmar grew. In January 2024, the Karen BGF began distancing itself from the ruling military junta, eventually splitting off from the army and rebranding themselves as the Karen National Army in April.

== History ==
=== Formation ===
The DKBA was formed for a variety of reasons. A Buddhist monk named U Thuzana had started a campaign in 1992 of constructing pagodas in Karen State, including at the KNU headquarters of Manerplaw. As the KNU leadership would not grant permission for construction of the pagodas, claiming they would attract government air strikes, Thuzana began to encourage KNLA soldiers to desert the organisation. Following a couple skirmishes and failed negotiations in early December 1994, the DKBA announced its formation and its split from the KNU on 1 January 1995. On January 27th, 1995, the DKBA assisted the SLORC in seizing Manerplaw, temporarily leaving the KNU without a headquarters. Its political wing composed of Buddhist officers, Democratic Karen Buddhist Organisation, was established on 21 December 1994.

=== 2000s ===
Pado Mahn Shar, the secretary-general of the Karen National Union, was assassinated at his home in Mae Sot, Thailand, on 14 February 2008. Several analysts claim that the assassination was possibly carried out by soldiers of the DKBA, though this has never been confirmed.

=== 2010s ===
In 2010, DKBA soldiers split away from the organisation and renamed themselves the Democratic Karen Benevolent Army – Brigade 5 (DKBA-5), which was led by Bo Nat Khann Mway (Saw Lar Phwal). The newly formed group originally had five brigades under its control (hence its name), but currently commands only three.

=== Resurgence ===
DKBA under the original name of Democratic Karen Buddhist Army reemerged under the command of Saw Kyaw Thet, a brigadier general who split away from DKBA-5. In early June 2021, a combined force of five armed groups; Democratic Karen Buddhist Army, PDF, KNU/KNLA Peace Council (KPC), Karen National Defence Organisation (KNDO) and a Karen Border Guard Force (BGF) splinter group clashed with Tatmadaw and Karen BGF in Phlu village, Karen state. Brigadier General Saw Kyaw Thet, stated that the five armed groups are cooperating throughout Karen state.
