= List of non-international armed conflicts =

The following is a list of non-international armed conflicts, fought between territorial and/or intervening state forces and non-state armed groups or between non-state armed groups within the same state or country. The terms "intrastate conflict", "internecine conflict", "internal conflict" and "civil war" are often used interchangeably with "non-international armed conflict", but "internecine war" can be used in a wider meaning, referring to any conflict within a single state, regardless of the participation of civil state or non-state forces. Thus, any war of succession is by definition an internecine war, but not necessarily a non-international armed conflict.

== Terminology ==
The Latin term bellum civile, meaning in English, civil war, was used to describe wars within a single community beginning around 60 A.D. The term is an alternative title for the work sometimes called Pharsalia by Lucan (Marcus Annaeus Lucanus) about the Roman civil wars that began in the last third of the second century BC. The term civilis here had the very specific meaning of 'Roman citizen'. Since the 17th century, the term has also been applied retroactively to other historical conflicts where at least one side claims to represent the country's civil society (rather than a feudal dynasty or an imperial power).

Since 1949, the term "non-international armed conflict" has been widely used to refer to armed conflict between territorial and/or intervening state forces and non-state armed groups or between non-state armed groups within the same state or country, instead of civil war. The head of the International Committee of the Red Cross (ICRC)'s Arms Unit, Kathleen Lawand, stated "The ICRC generally avoids using the term 'civil war' when communicating with the parties to an armed conflict or publicly, and speaks instead of 'non-international' or 'internal' armed conflicts, as these expressions mirror the terms used in common Article 3 [of the 1949 Geneva Conventions]."

== Ongoing non-international armed conflicts ==
The following non-international armed conflicts are ongoing as of April 2023. Only ongoing conflicts which meet the definition of a non-international armed conflict are listed. See List of ongoing armed conflicts and lists of active separatist movements for lists with a wider scope.

- Myanmar, Myanmar conflict, since 1948 (including the Myanmar civil war (2021–present))

Map of Myanmar Civil War (2021–present) Legend: Tatmadaw and allies: Tatmadaw and paramilitaries (Note: Border Guard Forces, Pyusawhti militias, Shanni Nationalities Army, Wuyang People's Militia, Khaunglanhpu People’s Militia, Rohingya militia, several India-based insurgent groups, smaller allied ethnic armed organisations, and local militias) Karen National Army Pa-O National Army Zomi Revolutionary Army (Note: India-based); National Unity Government and allies: People's Defence Force and allies (Note: All Burma Students' Democratic Front, Bamar People's Liberation Army, Burma National Revolutionary Army, People's Defence Force (Kalay), People's Liberation Army, People's Revolution Alliance (Magway), Student Armed Force, National Liberation Army (Myanmar), Yaw Army, smaller local groups) Kachin Independence Army and allies (Note: Kagabu People’s Force, Kachin Region People’s Defence Force (Kachin PDF)) Arakan Army Karen National Liberation Army and allies (Note: Karen National Defence Organisation, Kawthoolei Army, Democratic Karen Benevolent Army, KNU/KNLA Peace Council, Arakan Army (Kayin State), local PDF's, smaller resistance groups) Karenni IEC resistance forces (Note: Karenni Nationalities Defence Force, Karenni Army, Karenni National People's Liberation Front, Kayan National Army, local PDF's, smaller resistance groups) Chinland Council allies (Note: Chin National Army, majority of Chinland Defence Forces and some Zomi allied groups, local PDF's, smaller resistance groups) Chin Brotherhood Alliance (Note: Chin National Defence Force, minority of Chinland Defence Forces and some Zomi allied groups, local PDF's, smaller resistance groups) Pa-O National Liberation Army Danu People's Liberation Army and allies (Note: Danu State National Defence Army, local PDF's, smaller resistance groups) Mon resistance (Note: Ramonnya Mon Army, Mon State Revolutionary Force, Mon State Defense Force); Noncombatant ethnic armed organizations: United Wa State Army Myanmar National Democratic Alliance Army Ta'ang National Liberation Army Shan State Army (SSPP) Shan State Army (RCSS) National Democratic Alliance Army Mon National Liberation Army; Other combatants: Indian insurgent groups (Note: United National Liberation Front of Western South East Asia (National Socialist Council of Nagaland, United Liberation Front of Asom, Kamtapur Liberation Organisation), Coordination Committee (Kangleipak Communist Party, Kanglei Yawol Kanna Lup, People's Revolutionary Party of Kangleipak, People's Liberation Army of Manipur, United National Liberation Front, United Peoples Party of Kangleipak), smaller groups)

- Turkey,
  - Kurdish–Turkish conflict, since 1921 (low-level since 2025)
  - Maoist insurgency in Turkey, since 1972
  - DHKP/C insurgency in Turkey, since 1990
  - Turkey–Islamic State conflict, since 2013
  - AK Party–Gülen movement conflict, since 2013 (low-level since 2016 Turkish coup d'état attempt)
- Jamaica, Jamaican political conflict, since 1943
- India,
  - Insurgency in Northeast India, since 1954
  - Insurgency in Jammu and Kashmir, since 1989
- Indonesia, Papua conflict, since 1962
- DR Congo, Katanga insurgency, since 1963
  - Allied Democratic Forces insurgency, since 1996
  - Ituri conflict, since 1999
  - Kivu conflict, since 2004
- Colombia, Colombian conflict, since 1964
- Philippines, New People's Army rebellion, since 1969
- Morocco, Western Sahara conflict, since 1970
- Angola, Cabinda War, since 1975
- Laos, Insurgency in Laos, since 1975
- Somalia, Somali Civil War, since 1991

Approximate map of the current phase of the Somali Civil War Somalia: Federal Government of Somalia, the African Union Support and Stabilization Mission in Somalia, the United States, and contested territory Somali Future Council: Government of Puntland Jubaland Dervish Force and the Raskamboni Movement Jihadist insurgent groups: Islamic Wilayat of Somalia (al-Shabaab) and allies Islamic State-backed Somalia Wilayah Somaliland: Self-declared state of Somaliland

- Afghanistan, Afghan conflict, since 1978
  - Islamic State–Taliban conflict, since 2015
  - Republican insurgency in Afghanistan, since 2021
- Peru, Internal conflict in Peru, since 1980
- Senegal, Casamance conflict, 1982–2014 (main conflict), since 2015 (low-level conflict)
- Nigeria, Herder–farmer conflicts in Nigeria, since 1998
  - Boko Haram insurgency, since 2009
  - Nigerian bandit conflict, since 2011
- Insurgency in the Maghreb (2002–present), since 2002
- Iraq, Iraqi conflict, since 2003
  - Iraqi insurgency (2017–present), since 2017
- Thailand, South Thailand insurgency, since 2004
- Pakistan, Insurgency in Khyber Pakhtunkhwa, since 2004

War in North West Pakistan (2004-present) Under control of the Government and Allies Taliban, Al-Qaeda and Allies influence

- Paraguay, Insurgency in Paraguay, since 2005
- Mexico, Mexican drug war, since 2006
- Sudan, Sudanese nomadic conflicts, since 2008; Sudanese civil war (2023–present), since 2023

Map of Sudanese Civil War (2023–present) Controlled by Sudanese Armed Forces and allies (Transitional Sovereignty Council) Controlled by RSF (Government of Peace and Unity) Controlled by SPLM–N (al-Hilu) (New Sudan) Controlled by allied RSF and SPLM–N (al-Hilu) (Government of Peace and Unity and New Sudan) Controlled by Otoro rebel group Controlled by SLM (al-Nur) (Liberated Areas)

- War in the Sahel, since 2011
  - Mali, Mali War, since 2012
    Map of Mali Civil War (2012–present)
  - Burkina Faso, Islamist insurgency in Burkina Faso, since 2015
    Map of Burkina Faso Civil War (2015–present)
  - Niger, Islamist insurgency in Niger, since 2016
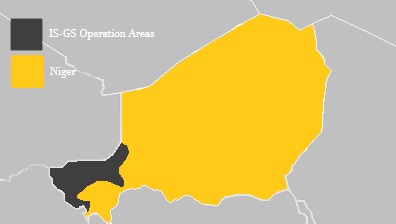
    Map of Niger Civil War (2016–present)
- Central African Republic, Central African Republic Civil War, since 2012

Map of the Central African Civil War (2012–present)

- Yemen, Yemeni civil war (2014–present), since 2014

Map of Yemeni Civil War (2014–present) Presidential Leadership Council (PLC) Supreme Political Council (SPC) Al-Qaeda in the Arabian Peninsula (AQAP)

- Cameroon, Anglophone Crisis, since 2017
- Mozambique, Insurgency in Cabo Delgado, since 2017

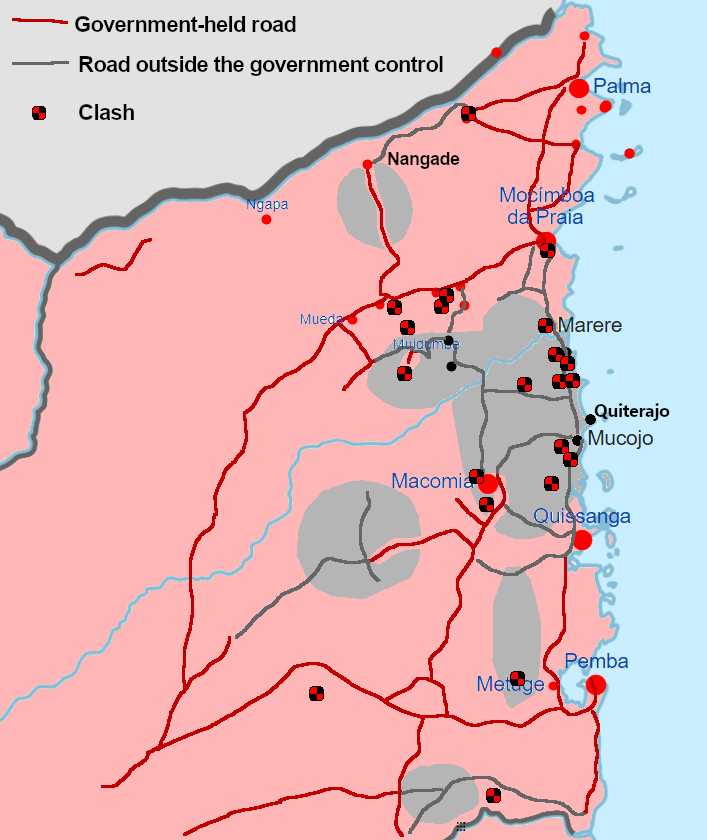
Map of the Insurgency in Cabo Delgado

- Ethiopia, Ethiopian civil conflict (2018–present), since 2018
  - OLA insurgency, since 2018
  - War in Amhara, since 2023

Map of Ethiopian Civil War (2020–present) Pro-federal government troops Ethiopian federal government and regional allies Anti-federal government rebels Controlled by the Tigray People's Liberation Front Oromo Liberation Army Fano

- Haiti, Haitian conflict, since 2020
- Bangladesh, Chittagong Hill Tracts conflict, since 2022
- Ecuador, Ecuadorian conflict (2024–present), since 2024

== Past non-international armed conflicts ==
=== Ancient and early medieval (before 1000) ===
This is a list of intrastate armed conflicts. Note that some conflicts lack both an article or citation. Without citation, they have not been guaranteed to have happened.

- The First Intermediate Period of Egypt, Second Intermediate Period of Egypt and Third Intermediate Period of Egypt were periods of political disunity in Ancient Egypt's history, characterized by frequent warfare between dynasties competing for dominance
- The Persian Revolt was a campaign led by Cyrus the Great against Median rule of Persia (552–550 BC)
- Civil war between Artaxerxes II and Cyrus III (c. 401 BC)
- Roman civil wars (a list of numerous civil wars in the late Roman Republic and in the Roman Empire, between 100 BC and AD 400)
- Hasmonean civil war (67–63 BC)
- Sasanian civil war of 589–591
- Sasanian civil war of 628–632
- First Fitna, 656–661, the first Islamic "civil war" between Ali and the Umayyads
- Second Fitna, c. 680/683 – c. 685/692, the second Islamic "civil war" between the Umayyads and Ibn al-Zubayr
- Twenty Years' Anarchy, 695–717, prolonged period of internal instability in the Byzantine Empire
- Civil War between Artabasdos and Constantine V, 741–743
- Third Fitna, 744–752, including the Umayyad civil wars of 744–748 and the Abbasid Revolution
- An Lushan Rebellion, 16 December 755 – 17 February 763
- Fourth Fitna, 809–827, including the Abbasid civil wars and other regional conflicts
- Anarchy of the 12 Warlords, 944–968

=== Medieval (1000–1600) ===
- Fitna of al-Andalus, 1009–1031
- Wars of the Guelphs and Ghibellines in Germany and Italy, 1125–1392
- Civil war era in Norway, 1130–1240
- Danish Civil Wars, 1131–1157
- The Anarchy, 1135–1153
- Civil war in the crusader Kingdom of Jerusalem between King Baldwin III and dowager Queen Melisende (1152–1153)
- Pandyan Civil War, 1169–1177
- Revolt of 1173–1174
- German throne dispute, 1198–1215; civil war within the Holy Roman Empire between the Hohenstaufen and Welf factions.
- First Barons' War, 1215–1217
- Age of the Sturlungs, 1220 – 1262/64
- Great Interregnum in the Holy Roman Empire, 1250–1273
- Second Barons' War, 1264–1267
- Hungarian Civil War, 1264–1265
- Civil War of Livonia between Livonian Order and the city of Riga and the Archbishopric of Riga, 1297–1330.
- Despenser War, 1321–1322
- Invasion of England, 1326. Continuation of the Despenser War.
- Byzantine civil war of 1321–1328
- Byzantine civil war of 1341–1347
- Byzantine civil war of 1352–1357
- Castilian Civil War, 1366–1369
- Byzantine civil war of 1373–1379
- Jingnan campaign, 1399-1402
- Welsh Revolt, 1400–1415
- Ottoman Interregnum, 1402–1413
- Regreg War, 1404 - 1406
- Armagnac–Burgundian Civil War, 1407–1435
- Kashmir Civil War, 1419–1420
- Hussite Wars, 1419–1434
- Great Feudal War in Russia, 1425–1453
- Swedish Civil War (1438–1439)
- Wars of the Roses, 1455–1485
- Catalan Civil War (1462–1472)
- Ōnin War, 1467–1477
- Sengoku period, 1467–1615
- War of the Castilian Succession, 1475–1479
- Popular revolts in late-medieval Europe
- German Peasants' War, 1524–1525
- Civil War in Kazakh Khanate, 1522–1538
- Inca Civil War, 1529–1532
- Civil War Era in Vietnam, 1533–1789
  - Lê–Mạc Dynasties War, 1533–1677
- Count's Feud, 1534–1536
- French Wars of Religion, 1562–1598
- Marian civil war, 1568–1573
- War against Sigismund, 1598–1599

=== Early modern (1600–1800) ===
- Trịnh–Nguyễn Lords War, 1627–1772; 1774–1775
  - Tây Sơn wars, 1771–1802
- Zebrzydowski rebellion, 1606–1609
- Shimabara Rebellion, 1637–1638
- Wars of the Three Kingdoms, 1639–1651 involved a number of civil wars:
  - Irish Confederate Wars, some parts of which were a civil war.
  - Scotland in the Wars of the Three Kingdoms, to some extent a civil war, 1644–1652
  - English Civil War, 1642–1651
    - First English Civil War, 1642–1646
    - Second English Civil War, 1648–1649
    - Third English Civil War, 1650–1651
- Acadian Civil War, 1640–1645
- The Fronde, 1648–1653
- The Ruin, 1659–1686
- Brunei Civil War, 1660s—1673
- Lubomirski's rebellion, 1665–1666
- Kongo Civil War, 1665–1709
- Monmouth Rebellion, May–July 1685
- Glorious Revolution, 1688–1689
- War of the Spanish Succession, 1701–1714
- Javanese Wars of Succession, 1703 - 1755
- Choctaw Civil War, 1747–1750
- Pugachev's Rebellion, 1773–1775
- American Revolutionary War 1775–83 - The American Revolution started as a civil war within the British Empire. (Note: Some historians name the 1861–1865 war the "Second American Civil War", because in their view, the American Revolutionary War can also be considered a civil war (since the term can be used in reference to any war in which one political body separates itself from another political body). They then refer to the Independence War, which resulted in the separation of the Thirteen Colonies from the British Empire, as the "First American Civil War". A significant number of American colonists stayed loyal to the British Crown and as Loyalists fought on the British side while opposite were a significant amount of colonists called Patriots who fought on the American side. In some localities, there was fierce fighting between Americans including gruesome instances of hanging, drawing, and quartering on both sides.: As early as 1789, David Ramsay, an American patriot historian, wrote in his History of the American Revolution that "Many circumstances concurred to make the American war particularly calamitous. It was originally a civil war in the estimation of both parties." Framing the American Revolutionary War as a civil war is gaining increasing examination.. You can read part two of his 1789 book in full here; A group of Bristol, England merchants wrote to King George III in 1775 voicing their “most anxious apprehensions for ourselves and Posterity that we behold the growing distractions in America threaten” and ask for their majesty’s “Wisdom and Goodness” to save them from “a lasting and ruinous Civil War.”. You can read the 1775 petition in full here; The “constrained voice” is a good synopsis of how the British viewed the American Revolutionary War. From anxiety to a foreboding sense of the conflict being a civil war, In the early stages of the rebellion by the American colonists, most of them still saw themselves as English subjects who were being denied their rights as such. “Taxation without representation is tyranny,” James Otis reportedly said in protest of the lack of colonial representation in Parliament. What made the American Revolution look most like a civil war, though, was the reality that about one-third of the colonists, known as loyalists (or Tories), continued to support and fought on the side of the crown.) It became a larger international war in 1778 once France joined. (Note: The Revolution was both an international conflict, with Britain and France vying on land and sea, and a civil war among the colonists, causing over 60,000 loyalists to flee their homes.: France entered the American Revolution on the side of the colonists in 1778, turning what had essentially been a civil war into an international conflict.; Until early in 1778 the conflict was a civil war within the British Empire, but afterward it became an international war as France (in 1778) and Spain (in 1779) joined the colonies against Britain. Meanwhile, the Netherlands, which provided both official recognition of the United States and financial support for it, was engaged in its own war against Britain.)
- Yoruba Wars, 1789 - 1839
- Brabant Revolution, 1789; between Belgian forces and the Austrian Empire
- Chouannerie, 1792–1800; between Royalist and Republican forces, part of the French Revolutionary Wars
- War in the Vendée, 1793–1804; between Royalist and Republican forces, part of the French Revolutionary Wars

=== Modern (1800–1945) ===
- Padri War, 1803–1837
- Musket Wars, 1806–1845
- Gutiérrez–Magee Expedition, 1812–1813
- Argentine Civil Wars, 1814–1880
- Ndwandwe–Zulu War, 1817–1819
- Long Expedition, 1819, 1821
- Greek Civil Wars, 1823–1825
- Ochomogo War, 1823
- Fredonian Rebellion, 1826–1827
- Liberal Wars, in Portugal, 1828–1834
- Chilean Civil War, 1829–1830
- Revolutions of 1830; numerous European countries, 1830
- Egyptian–Ottoman War (1831–1833)
- Carlist Wars, 1833–1839, 1846–1849, and 1872–1876
- Texas Revolution 1835–1836
- Ragamuffin War, 1835–1845
- League War, 1835
- Chimayó Rebellion, 1837
- Córdova Rebellion, 1838
- Uruguayan Civil War, 1839–1851
- War of the Supremes, 1839–1842
- Rio Grande Rebellion, 1840
- Yucatán Rebellion, 1841–1848
- The New Zealand Wars, 1845 - 1872
- Bear Flag Revolt, 1846
- Patuleia War, Portugal, 1846–1847
- Sonderbund War, November 1847
- Revolutions of 1848; numerous European countries, 1848–1849
- Revolution of 1851
- Taiping Rebellion, 1850–1864
- Bleeding Kansas, 1854–1858
- Indian Rebellion of 1857
- Utah War, 1857–1858
- Bendahara War, 1857–1863
- War of Reform, 1857–1861
- Banjarmasin War, 1859–1863
- Federal War, 1859–1863
- Larut Wars, 1861–1874
- American Civil War, 1861–1865
- Afghan Civil War, 1863–1869
- Austro-Prussian War, 1866
- Klang War; also known as Selangor Civil War, 1867–1874
- Boshin War, 1868–1869
- Satsuma Rebellion, 1877
- Jementah Civil War, 1878
- Afghan Civil War, 1880–1881
- The North-West Rebellion, 1885
- Revolution of the Park, 1890
- Chilean Civil War, 1891
- Argentine Revolution of 1893, 1893
- War of Canudos, 1896–1897
- Federal Revolution, 1898
- Boxer Rebellion, 1899-1901
- Philippine–American War, 1899–1902
- Moro Rebellion, 1899–1913
- Thousand Days' War, 1899–1902
- Liberating Revolution (Venezuela), 1901–1903
- Argentine Revolution of 1905, 1905
- Russian Revolution of 1905, 1905–1907
- Persian Constitutional Revolution, 1905–1911, Civil War considered to begin after 1908
- Mexican Revolution, 1910–1920
- Paraguayan Civil War, 1911–1912
- War of 1912, 1912
- Warlord Era; period of civil wars between regional, provincial, and private armies in China, 1912–1928
- First Caco War, 1915
- Second Caco War, 1918–1920
- Russian Civil War, 1917–1923
- Iraqi–Kurdish conflict, 1918–2003
- Finnish Civil War, 1918
- Ukrainian–Soviet War, 1917–1921
- German Revolution, 1918–1919
- Revolts during the Turkish War of Independence, includes conflict between the Imperial Ottoman Government and the Turkish National Movement, 1919–1922
- First Honduran Civil War, 1919
- Irish Civil War, 1922–1923
- Paraguayan Civil War, 1922–1923
- Second Honduran Civil War, 1924
- Nicaraguan Civil War, 1926–1927
- Cristero War, 1926–1929
- Chinese Civil War, 1927–1937, 1945–1949 (de facto)
- Afghan Civil War, 1928–1929
- Constitutionalist Revolution, 1932
- Austrian Civil War, February 1934
- Arab revolt in Palestine, 1936–1939
- Spanish Civil War, 1936–1939
- Ukrainian Insurgent Army insurgency, 1943–1956
- Italian Civil War during WWII 1943–1945
- Guerrilla war in the Baltic states, 1944–1956

=== Since 1945 ===
- Greek Civil War, 1946–1949 in Greece
- Paraguayan Civil War, 1947 in Paraguay
- Malagasy Uprising, 1947–1949 in Madagascar
- Civil War in Mandatory Palestine, to 1947–1948 in Palestine
- Costa Rican Civil War, 1948 in Costa Rica
- Yeosu–Suncheon rebellion, 1948 in South Korea
- Jeju uprising, 1948 in South Korea
- Madiun affair, 1948 in Indonesia
- La Violencia, 1948–1958 in Colombia
- Communist insurgency in Burma, 1948–1989 in Myanmar
- Internal conflict in Myanmar, ongoing since 1948 in Myanmar
- Korean War, 1950–1953 in South Korea and North Korea
- Cuban Revolution, 1953–1959 in Cuba
- Algerian War, 1954–1962 in Algeria
- First Sudanese Civil War, 1955–1972 in Sudan
- Revolución Libertadora, 1955 in Argentina
- Vietnam War, 1955-1975 in Indochina between South Vietnam and North Vietnam
- Permesta Rebellion, 1958-1961 in Indonesia
- Laotian Civil War, 1959–1975 in Laos

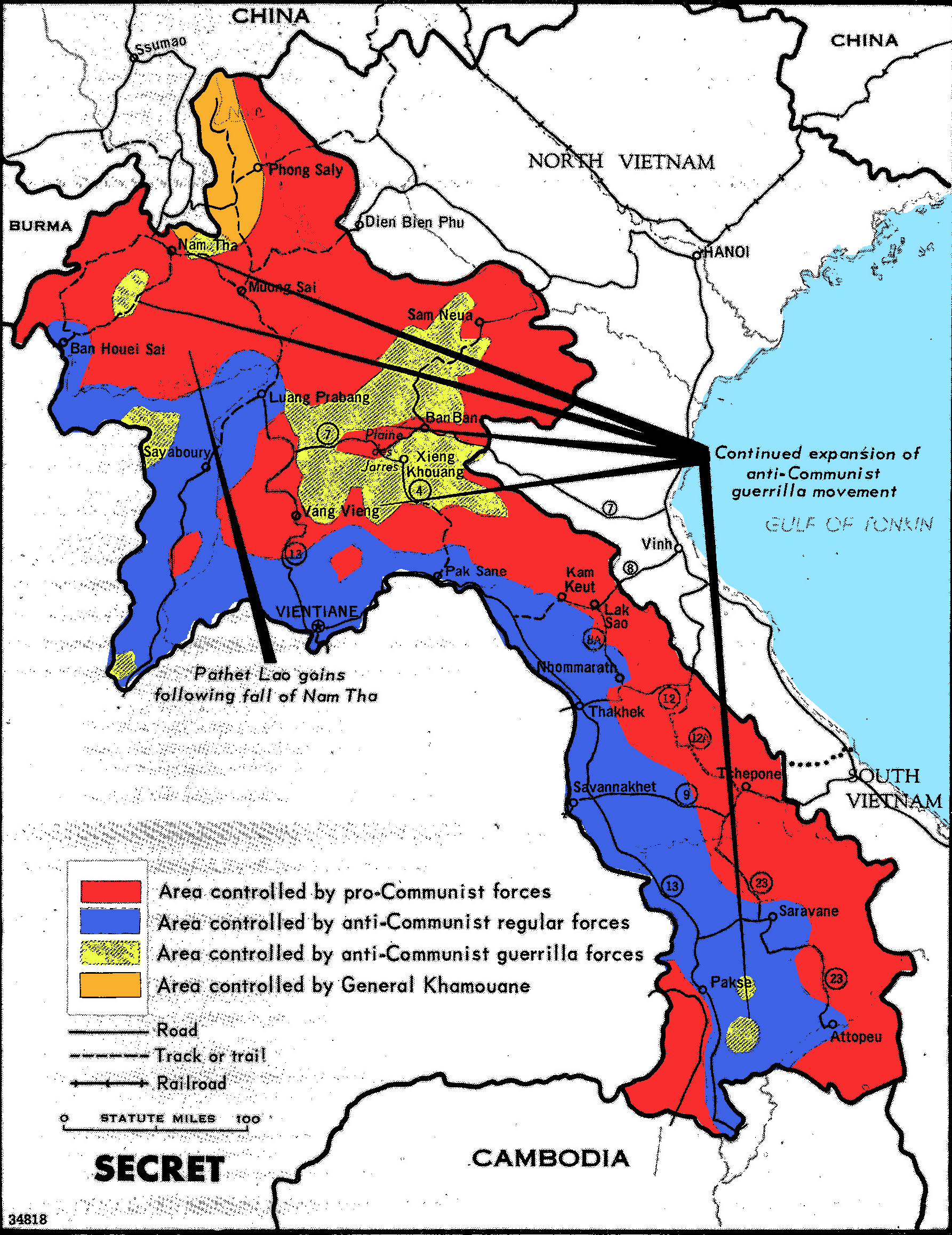
Situation in Laos, 23 July 1962

- Anti-Strossener Resistance, 1959–1976 in Paraguay
- Basque conflict, 1959–2011 inSpain & France
- Congo Crisis, 1960–1966 in Congo-Léopoldville
- Guatemalan Civil War, 1960–1996 in Guatemala
- Portuguese Colonial War, 1961–1974 in Portugal/Portuguese colonies
- Nicaraguan Revolution, 1961–1990 in Nicaragua
- North Yemen Civil War, 1962–1970 in North Yemen
- Communist insurgency in Sarawak, 1962–1990 in Malaysia
- Dominican Civil War, 1965 in Dominican Republic
- Rhodesian Bush War, 1965–1980 in Rhodesia
- First Chadian Civil War, 1965-1979 in Chad
- Communist insurgency in Thailand, 1965–1983 in Thailand
- Ñancahúazu Guerrilla, 1966–1967 in Bolivia
- Cambodian Civil War, 1967–1975 in Cambodia
- Nigerian Civil War, 1967–1970 in Nigeria
- Communist insurgency in Malaysia (1968–1989), 1968–1989 in Malaysia
- Moro conflict, 1968-2019 in Philippines
- Political violence in Turkey, 1968–1980 in Turkey
- Years of Lead, 1968–1988 in Italy
- The Troubles, 1968–1998 in United Kingdom
- Dirty War, 1969-1979 in Argentina
- Black September, 1970 to 1971 in Jordan
- Bangladesh Liberation War, 1971 in Bangladesh
- Uruguayan intrastate war 1972–1973, in Uruguay
- 1972-1975 Bangladesh insurgency, 1972-1975 in Bangladesh
- Armed resistance in Chile (1973–1990), 1973-1990 in Chile
- Ethiopian Civil War, 1974–1991 in Ethiopia
- East Timorese civil war, 1975 in Timor-Leste
- Lebanese Civil War, 1975–1990 in Lebanon
- Mozambican Civil War, 1975–1992 in Mozambique
- Angolan Civil War, 1975–2002 in Angola
- Insurgency in Aceh, 1976–2005 in Indonesia
- Saur Revolution, 27–28 April 1978, which marked the beginning of the Afghanistan conflict (1978–present)
- Salvadoran Civil War, 1979–1992 in El Salvador
- Discontent fomented amongst the people of Afghanistan after the 1978 Saur Revolution, and the first anti-government revolts began in October 1978 until 24 December 1979, part of / also called Afghanistan conflict (1978–present)
- Ugandan Bush War, 1980-1986 in Uganda
- Second Sudanese Civil War, 1983–2005 in Sudan
- Sri Lankan Civil War, 1983–2009 in Sri Lanka
- South Yemen Civil War, 1986 in South Yemen
- 1987-1989 JVP insurrection in Sri Lanka
- Afghan Civil War (1989–1992), 15 February 1989 – 30 April 1992. The continuing part of the civil war that started in the 1978 Saur Revolution after the Soviet Union withdrew from Afghanistan, leaving the Afghan communist government to fend for itself against the Mujahideen months later part of / also called Afghanistan conflict (1978–present)
- First Liberian Civil War, 1989–1996 in Liberia
- Rwandan Civil War, 1990–1994 in Rwanda
- Georgian Civil War, 1991–1993 in Georgia
- Iraqi uprisings, 1991 in Iraq
- Sierra Leone Civil War, 1991–2002 in Sierra Leone
- Djiboutian Civil War, 1991-1994 in Djibouti
- Algerian Civil War, 1992–2002 in Algeria
- Bosnian War, 1992-1995, in Bosnia and Herzegovina
- Tajikistani Civil War, 1992–1997 in Tajikistan
- Afghan Civil War (1992–1996), 30 April 1992 – 27 September 1996. When the Afghan communist government falls to the Mujahideen there was a rise in different kinds of ideology, power-sharing, Belligerents and violent fighting continue to escalate part of / also called Afghanistan conflict (1978–present)
- Burundian Civil War, 1993–2005 in Burundi
- First Republic of the Congo Civil War, 1993–1994 in Congo
- First Yemeni Civil War, 1994 in Yemen
- Iraqi Kurdish Civil War, 1994–1997 in Iraq
- First Chechen War, 1994–1996 in Russia
- Chiapas conflict, 1994 to 2020 in Mexico
- Nepalese Civil War, 1996–2006 in Nepal
- Afghan Civil War (1996–2001), 27 September 1996 – 7 October 2001. In 1996 the Taliban captured the Afghan capital Kabul and established the Islamic Emirate of Afghanistan part of / also called Afghanistan conflict (1978–present)
- First Congo War, 1996–1997 in DR Congo
- Clashes in Cambodia, 1997 in Cambodia
- Albanian civil unrest, 1997 in Albania
- Second Republic of the Congo Civil War, 1997–1999 in Congo
- Guinea-Bissau Civil War, 1998–1999 in Guinea-Bissau
- Second Congo War, 1998–2003 in DR Congo
- Kosovo war, 1998–1999 in FR Yugoslavia
- Second Liberian Civil War, 1999–2003 in Liberia
- Insurgency in Macedonia, 2001 in Macedonia
- War in Afghanistan, 19 June 2002 – 20 August 2021. War between the U.S.-led NATO and Afghanistan ended when Hamid Karzai was elected by an Afghan loya jirga to the presidency of the Transitional Islamic State of Afghanistan on 19 June 2002. Since 19 June 2002, the conflict became non-international after U.S.-led NATO and Afghan forces fought the Taliban insurgency part of / also called Afghanistan conflict (1978–present) in Afghanistan
- First Ivorian Civil War, 2002–2007 in Ivory Coast
- War in Darfur, 2003–2020 in Sudan
- Iraq War, 28 June 2004–December 15, 2011 in Iraq. War between the U.S.-led Coalition and Iraq ended on 28 June 2004 when the Coalition Provisional Authority handed over Iraqi sovereignty to the Iraqi Interim Government. Since 28 June 2004, the conflict turned non-international with U.S.-led Multi-National Force in Iraq and Iraqi forces fighting against the Iraqi insurgency.
- First Central African Republic Civil War, 2004–2007 in Central African Republic
- Second Chadian Civil War, 2005-2010 in Chad
- Battle of Gaza (2007), 2007 in Palestine
- First Iraqi Civil War, 2006–2008 in Iraq
- First Libyan Civil War, 2011 in Libya
- Syrian civil war, 2011–2024 in (Ba'athist Syria) Syria

Map of Syrian Civil War (2011–2024) Syrian Armed Forces Syrian Free Army and American occupation Turkish occupation and ex-Syrian National Army Syrian Democratic Forces and Deir ez-Zor defectors Suwayda Druze factions Israeli occupation and invasion Russian occupation and Assadist insurgent presence

- Second Ivorian Civil War, 2011 in Ivory Coast
- South Sudanese Civil War, 2013–2018 in South Sudan

Map of South Sudanese Civil War (2013–2018) Under control of the Government of South Sudan and Allies Under control of the Sudan People's Liberation Movement-in-Opposition and Allies Under control of the Government of Peace and Unity Under control of the UNISFA

- 2013 Lahad Datu standoff, 2013 Malaysia
- Second Iraqi Civil War, 2013–2017, also known as War in Iraq
- Second Libyan Civil War, 2014–2020 in Libya

Map of Libyan Civil War (2014–2020) Under the control of the House of Representatives and the Libyan National Army (LNA) Under the control of the Government of National Accord (GNA) and different militias forming the Libya Shield Force Controlled by local forces

- Tigray War, 2020–2022 in Ethiopia

== See also ==
- List of English civil wars
- List of coups and coup attempts
- List of hostage crises
- List of ongoing armed conflicts
- List of revolutions and rebellions
- List of Roman civil wars and revolts
- List of terrorist incidents
- List of wars by death toll
- List of wars of independence
- Exclusive mandate
- Frozen conflict
