= Shwe Kokko offensive =

Failed offensive in the Myanmar Civil War

Shwe Kokko Offensive
- Part of the Myanmar civil war (2021–present) and the Myanmar conflict
Date	1 April 2023 – 11 April 2023 (1 week and 3 days)
Location	Shwe Kokko, Myawaddy District, Myanmar
Result	SAC victory

Belligerents
Kawthoolei Army Karen National Liberation Army Brigade 5 People's Defense Force KNU/KNLA Peace Council Renegades	State Administration Council: Myanmar Army; Border Guard Forces; Karen Border Guard Force; Karen National Liberation Army Brigade 7 (disputed)

Commanders and leaders
Nerdah Myah; Saw Lat Kai and Saw Kyaw Kayaw	Min Aung Hlaing; Saw Chit Thu

Strength
Unknown	Unknown

Casualties and losses
At least 24 killed	At least 80 killed
- At least 10,000 refugees

The Shwe Kokko Offensive was a failed offensive by Karen EAOs and the People's Defense Force (including rogue elements of the KNU/KNLA Peace Council and Kawthoolei Army splinter group) on the city of Shwe Kokko.

== Background ==
Shwe Kokko, a town in the Thai border area of Myawaddy District, serves as the headquarters of Saw Chit Thu's Karen BGF.

Over time, it gained notoriety as a gambling hotspot for Chinese tourists, a scam center, and a destination for human trafficking.

=== Kawthoolei Army ===
On 17 July 2022, ousted KNDO commander-in-chief, Nerdah Myah, formed the Kawthoolei Army to fight the Myanmar SAC junta independently. According to Karen media, he formed the group after allegedly obstructing an investigation related to a massacre of 25 unarmed civilians.

== Offensive ==
In spite of animosity, KNLA Brigade 5, the Kawthoolei Army, a rogue faction of the KNU/KNLA Peace Council, and the People's Defense Force jointly launched attacks on Myanmar Army and BGF positions near Shwe Kokko. Initially, the attacks went somewhat smoothly, resulting in the capture of at least five BGF outposts.

However, starting in April 8th, the offensive began to falter as Myanmar Army Mi-35 helicopters started to bomb anti-junta positions.

== Aftermath ==
By April 11th, the BGF fully regained control of Shwe Kokko. At least 10,000 civilians of various nationalities fled to Thailand. Allegedly, some KNLA commanders (such as the leader of Brigade 7) aided the BGF in exchange for profits from another Myawaddy fraud factory, KK Park. Although Brigade 7 denied this charge, it announced that KTLA forces are forbidden from moving within their operational area.

While Shwe Kokko did not face another attack, the Three Brotherhood Alliance and other anti-junta forces successfully crippled scam operations in the Kokang Region as part of Operation 1027 six months later.
