= Ho Chih-wei =

Taiwanese politician

- 何志偉
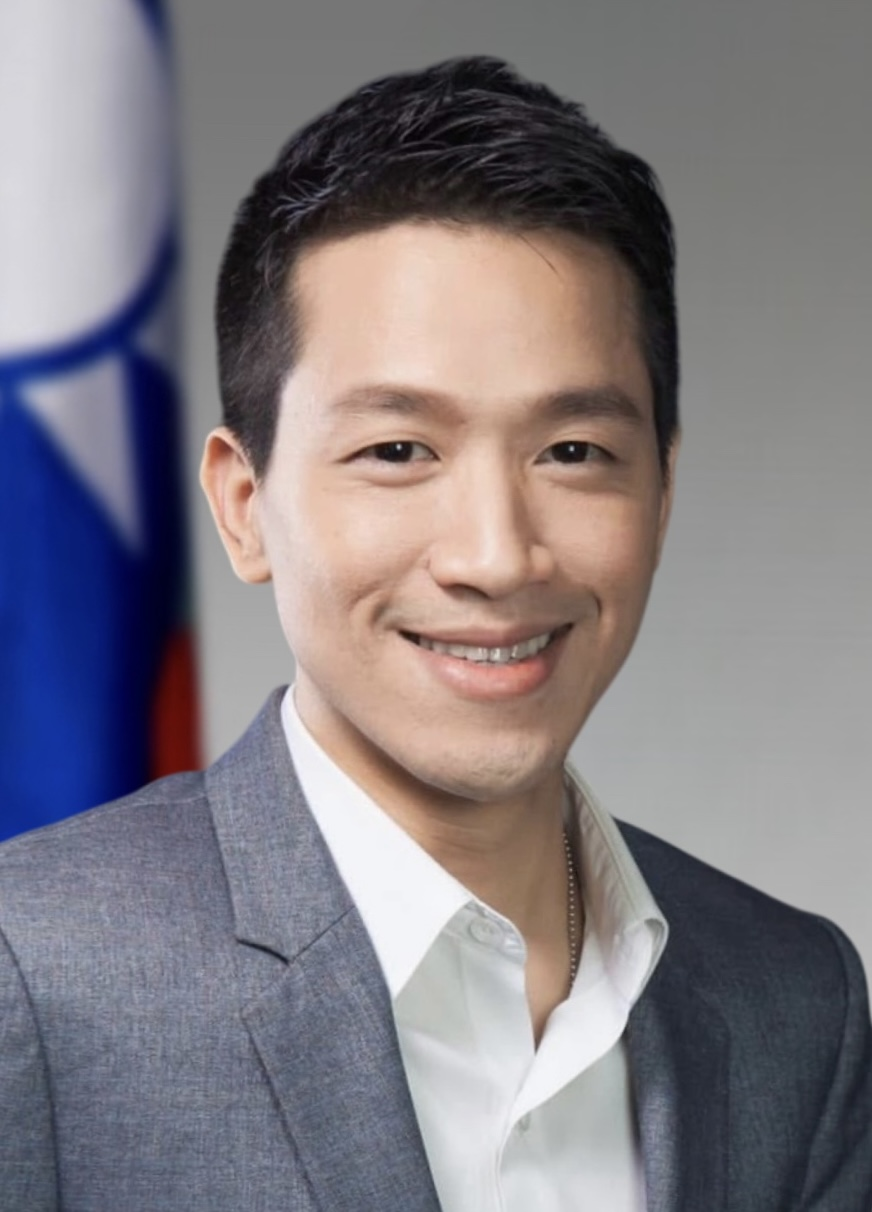
- Official portrait, 2024

Deputy Secretary-General to the President
- Incumbent
- Assumed office 20 May 2024
- Secretary-General: Pan Men-an
- Preceded by: Alex Huang

Member of the Legislative Yuan
- In office 1 February 2019 – 31 January 2024
- Preceded by: Pasuya Yao
- Succeeded by: Wang Shih-chien
- Constituency: Taipei 2

Taipei City Councillor
- In office 25 December 2010 – 25 December 2018
- Constituency: District 1 (Datong–Shilin)

Personal details
- Born: 14 May 1982 (age 44) U.S.
- Party: Democratic Progressive Party
- Parent: Hsueh Ling (mother)
- Education: California State University, Fullerton (BBA); University of Southern California (MPA, LLM); National Chengchi University (PhD)

Ho Chih-wei (Chinese: 何志偉; pinyin: Hé Zhìwěi; Wade–Giles: Ho^{2} Chih^{4}-wei^{3}; born 14 May 1982), also known by his English name Mark Ho, is an American-born Taiwanese management scientist and politician who is the deputy secretary-general of the Office of the President of Taiwan. Ho previously served on the Legislative Yuan for Taipei from 2019 to 2024, and as a Taipei City Councilor from 2010 to 2018.

== Early life and education ==
Ho as born in the United States in 1982 to Hsueh Ling. After graduating from Taipei WEGO Private Senior High School, he graduated from California State University, Fullerton, with a Bachelor of Business Administration. He then earned a Master of Public Administration (M.P.A.) and a Master of Laws (LL.M.) from the University of Southern California and returned to Taiwan, where he earned his Ph.D. in information management from National Chengchi University.

== Political career ==
Ho was elected to the Taipei City Council for the first time in 2010. That year, he was also elected to the Democratic Progressive Party's central standing committee. In July 2012, Ho was reelected to the central standing committee. During the 2012 presidential elections, Ho helped run Tsai Ing-wen's campaign in Taipei. Ho contested a 2014 primary, and secured support from the Democratic Progressive Party for his reelection bid to the city council. In December 2018, the DPP nominated Ho to run in a legislative by-election scheduled as a result of Pasuya Yao's resignation. He faced four other candidates, including Kuomintang nominee Chen Ping-fu, and three independents. Ho was elected to the Legislative Yuan on 27 January 2019, with 38,591 votes, amid a voter turnout of 30.39 percent.

On February 2026, Ho met with Nerdah Mya, the leader of the Myanmar-based Kawthoolei Army insurgent group, at a private dinner in Taipei. In a statement to Taipei Times,he denied sponsorship of the Kawthoolei Army; stating that conversations mostly revolved around wine and postsecondary study experiences in California.
