= Siege of Myawaddy =

2024 military engagement in Myanmar

- Part of the Myanmar civil war (2021–present)
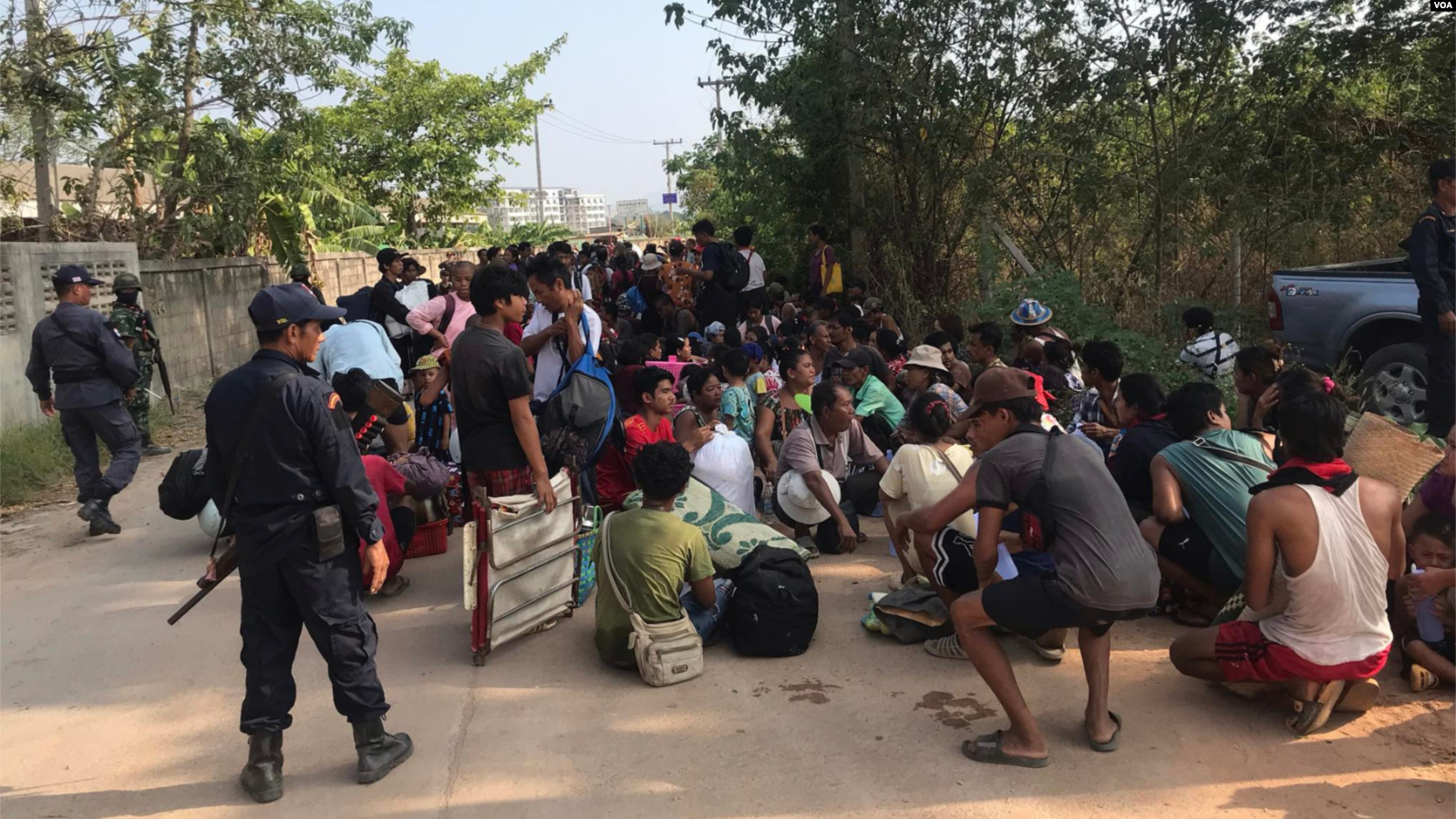
- Civilians fleeing to Thailand during the siege of Myawaddy
Date	6 April – 24 April 2024 (2 weeks and 4 days)
Location	Myawaddy Township 16.6857°N 98.5067°E
Result	SAC and allies victory: Karen resistance withdrawal from Kawkareik and Myawaddy by 24 April

Belligerents
Karen National Union: Karen National Liberation Army; Karen National Defence Organisation; People's Defence Force; Democratic Karen Buddhist Army; KNU/KNLA Peace Council	State Administration Council: Karen National Army

Commanders and leaders
Unknown	Soe Win: Saw Chit Thu

Strength
Unknown	~200 (at the base of 275th Light Infantry Battalion)

Casualties and losses
Unknown	600+ surrendered (Including family members of the soldiers)

The siege of Myawaddy was a significant military engagement that occurred in early 2024 during the Myanmar civil war. The siege took place in the town of Myawaddy, located on the eastern border with Thailand.

== Background ==
Myawaddy serves as a vital border town for overland trade between Myanmar and Thailand. The State Administration Council (SAC), the military junta which seized power in Myanmar in 2021, faced escalating attacks by ethnic Karens, supported by other anti-coup factions. The Karen National Union (KNU), in particular, had been engaged in a struggle for self-rule since Myanmar's independence in 1948.

== Initial capture ==
Since December 2023, Karen forces were targeting junta forces in Kawkareik as well as the Hpa-an–Myawaddy road, which is part of Asian Highway 1.

The siege began with weeks of sustained attacks by ethnic Karen insurgents on military positions in and around Myawaddy. On 5 April, after a prolonged siege and several days of negotiations, over 600 SAC junta soldiers stationed in Myawaddy agreed to surrender to the KNU and withdrew across the border to Mae Sot, leaving only the 275th Light Infantry Battalion (LIB) positioned near the town's western entrance for defence. On 7 April, junta officials fled into Thailand. The junta requested Thailand for a military flight from Mae Sot to evacuate certain officials and others awaiting refuge on the border.

Karen National Liberation Army (KNLA) and People's Defence Force (PDF) troops were seen at the Thai–Myanmar Friendship Bridge border crossing in northeastern Myawaddy on the morning of 9 April. Later that afternoon, the KNLA and PDF launched a heavy assault on the 275th LIB base. Fighting ended late the next day, when the KNLA and PDF captured the base. Over 200 junta soldiers withdrew to another bridge on the border. In response, Thailand deployed the 3rd Army along the border. The junta began sending reinforcements in a counteroffensive to retake the town, but were stalled in Kyondoe. On 12 April, Thai officials and the KNU spokesperson confirmed the capture of Myawaddy. The junta retaliated with airstrikes despite locals stating that the KNLA were not in the streets of the town.

=== Aftermath ===
Despite the KNLA's major role in capturing Myawaddy, the KNLA and PDF groups ceded the city's control to the Karen National Army (KNA), KNU/KNLA Peace Council (KNU/KNLA-PC), and the Democratic Karen Benevolent Army (DKBA-5) to ensure security within the city. According to the KNU/KNLA-PC, the KNA was playing a major role in negotiations between the KNU and the junta regarding Myawaddy.

== Operation "Aung Zeya" ==
After Myawaddy's capture, the Light Infantry Division 55 (LID 55)–numbering around 1,000 and reportedly led by the junta second-in-command Soe Win–began attempting to cross the Dawna Range to recapture the town in a counteroffensive known as "Operation Aung Zeya". LID 55 was continually intercepted by the KNLA and their allies and was forced to retreat, reportedly sustaining heavy losses. On 19 April, the NMSP-AD began launching attacks on a junta convoy in Kyaikmaraw Township heading towards Myawaddy. Late on 19 April, the KNLA began launching attacks on the remaining 150 junta soldiers from the LIB 275th which retreated under the 2nd Thai-Myanmar Friendship Bridge on 10 April, the last junta hold-out in the town. The junta responded with airstrikes.

Early in the counteroffensive, KNLA forces withdrew from Kawkareik. On 21 April, a junta convoy was ambushed and routed in Kawkareik town, allowing the KNLA to capture several military vehicles. Despite this, Kawkareik was entirely recaptured from Karen forces the next day.

The conflict escalated on 20 April when the military reportedly used artillery, fighter jets, and helicopter gunships to attack KNLA positions, and resistance forces used 40mm machine guns and dropped 20 bombs from drones, prompting hundreds of people to flee across the Moei River. A stray bullet from the clashes struck a house on the Thai side of the border.

On 23 April, junta forces from the LIB 275th, which had been sheltering under the 2nd Friendship Bridge, were assisted by the Karen National Army in reoccupying their base outside Myawaddy. On 24 April, the Karen rebels retreated from Myawaddy, and the Karen National Army and the Tatmadaw achieved joint control of Myawaddy. The KNU spokesmen stated that they would "temporarily withdraw" from Myawaddy, but stated that the KNLA would continue guerrilla attacks on junta positions along the Asian Highway 1.

After being trapped in Kawkareik town for several weeks due to resistance ambushes and attacks, the 1,000-man LID 55 reinforcements sent by the junta to aid forces in Myawaddy in Operation Aung Zeya began advancing through the Dawna Range, reaching the Taw Naw waterfall by 29 April. After reaching the waterfall, the offensive again stalled, with junta forces not making any major gains the following month. Residents of Myawaddy reported that the Karen National Army was aiding junta soldiers in Operation Aung Zeya by helping them through forested paths leading to the town, with "hundreds" of junta soldiers being stationed in the town by the end of May.

== Role of BGF ==
Multiple sources and analysts showed the Border Guard Forces (BGF) army took control of Myawaddy after the SAC junta's remaining troops from the 275th LIB retreated, and later facilitated the transfer of junta troops from their base to the 2nd Friendship Bridge. Jason Tower, the Myanmar director of the United States Institute of Peace, said BGF had been playing both sides and that it ultimately pivoted to assist the military regime, "leading to the photo op of the Myanmar flag once again being raised over the base".

== Impact ==
Trade through Myawaddy had already been declining due to clashes in neighboring areas. Official figures from the Myanmar junta's Ministry of Commerce showed a significant drop in trade value between April 2023 and February 2024. The ongoing conflict between the military and anti-regime forces further exacerbated the decline in trade, affecting both legal and unofficial border trade routes.

== Reactions ==
Thailand’s Foreign Ministry said it was closely monitoring the situation and "will continue to provide further humanitarian assistance if necessary and will do our utmost to ensure the situation along the Thai-Myanmar border area returns to normalcy".
