= Nerdah Mya =

Self-Proclaimed leader of Republic of Kawthoolei

- စီၤနၢၤဒါမၠး
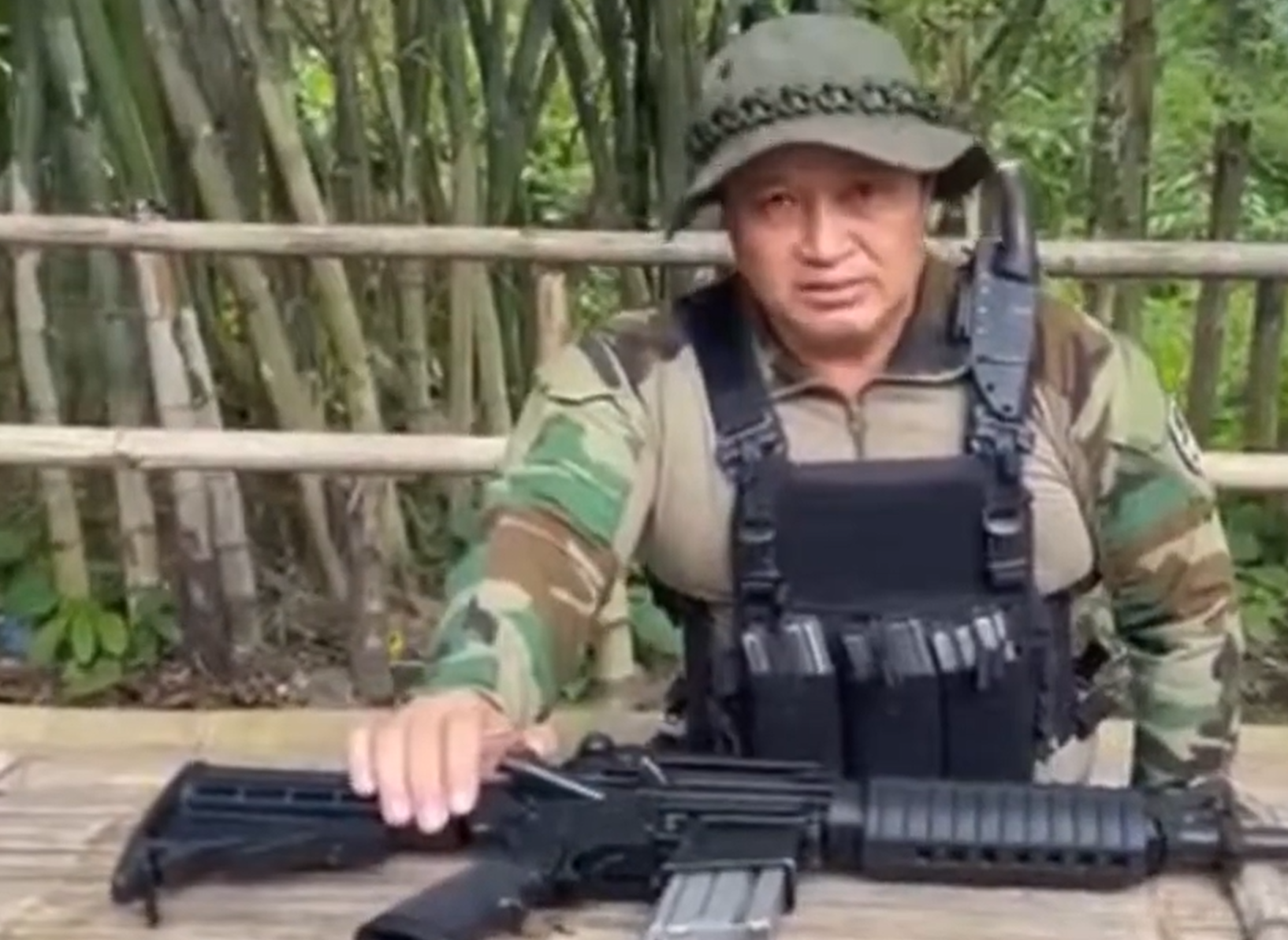
- Nerdah Mya in 2022 giving a speech on YouTube

President of the Republic of Kawthoolei
- Incumbent
- Assumed office November 2023

Personal details
- Born: Bangkok, Thailand

Nerdah Mya (S'gaw Karen: စီၤနၢၤဒါမၠး; Burmese: စောနယ်ဒါးမြ; Thai: เนอดา เมียะ) is a Karen political figure and armed group leader who proclaimed the establishment of the Republic of Kawthoolei on 5 January 2026 in Karen State, Myanmar. He simultaneously declared himself president of the self-proclaimed republic.

== Biography ==
Nerdah Mya is the second son of Bo Mya, a former chairman of the Karen National Union (KNU). He reportedly held Thai citizenship, as he was born in Thailand.

He spent six years in the United States, where he obtained a Bachelor's degree in Liberal Arts from Pacific College in California. After graduating in 1994, he initially intended to return to the Thailand-Burma border for only a short visit. However, witnessing the "1994 Karen split" (when the Buddhist DKBA broke away from the Christian-led KNU) motivated him to stay and join the resistance. He served as the commander of the 201st Battalion of the Karen National Liberation Army (KNLA) in 2000 before rising to become a major general and the Chief of Staff of the Karen National Defence Organisation (KNDO). Leveraging his education and English fluency, he served as the KNU Foreign Affairs Secretary. He has met with international diplomats and politicians, including the Norwegian Royal Family, to raise awareness for the Karen cause.

In January 2007, he was involved in a major rift within the KNU. He supported Brig-Gen Htain Maung (Commander of Brigade 7) in unauthorized peace talks with the Burmese military junta. Reports indicated that Nerdah Mya, along with his family and security personnel, joined Htain Maung in breaking away from the KNU. Following the 2007 split, he was became a member of the newly formed KNU/KNLA Peace Council, which established its headquarters in Toh Kaw Koe village. Despite his involvement with the breakaway faction, then–KNU General Secretary Mahn Sha stated that Nerdah Mya was not immediately removed from the Central Committee because of the continued influence of his father, Bo Mya. During this period, he was frequently associated with Pastor Timothy, who was a prominent figure in opposition to the KNU leadership at the time.

In 2014, he linked outbreaks of armed conflict to the government's "mega-development projects", specifically the planned hydropower dams on the Salween River. He alleged the government used military force to clear opposition areas to facilitate these projects. By late 2014, he described the ceasefire and peace talks with the government as being in a "stalemate".

In 2015, as head of the KNDO, he dismissed the Nationwide Ceasefire Agreement (NCA) as "ridiculous" because it excluded major resistance groups like the Kachin and Shan.

Following the February 2021 military coup in Myanmar, he served as a spokesperson for the KNU Concerned Group, a group formed in 2017 comprising senior and former Karen National Union leaders. He publicly condemned the 2021 military coup, labeling the military's claims of election fraud a "blatant lie" and a "deliberate fraud" intended to seize power from the people. He advocated the unification of Karen armed groups, including the Democratic Karen Benevolent Army, the KNU KNLA Peace Council, and the Border Guard Force, into a single force to protect the Karen people.

In January 2022, Nerdah Mya was dismissed from his position as head of the KNDO by the KNU leadership. He was replaced by Brig-Gen Saw Shee Lay. This followed an investigation into the killing of 25 people in May 2021, an incident he claimed involved military spies.

He later separated from the Karen National Union (KNU) following disagreements over political and military direction. On July 17, 2022, he established the Kawthoolei Army (KTLA) as an independent armed organization. He stated the KTLA was formed as a "backup force" to build a federal army and fight the military dictatorship, specifically because he felt some KNU leaders were cooperating with the military regime.

In February 2024, reports surfaced that the Mae Sot District Governor's Office in Thailand revoked the Thai citizenship of Saw Nerdah Mya. The revocation was reportedly due to the discovery that he had incorrectly obtained citizenship by using someone else's registration.

On 5 January 2026, Nerdah Mya proclaimed the formation of the Republic of Kawthoolei in Karen State, Myanmar, citing the principle of self-determination for the Karen people. He announced the establishment of a provisional government, appointing positions including president, vice president, prime minister, and several acting ministers. The KNU dismissed the declaration as "nonsense" and a "publicity stunt," stating that Nerdah Mya does not represent the Karen people and has had no connection to the KNU since his 2022 dismissal.

On February 2026, Nerdah Mya visited Taipei, Taiwan where he met with the Office of the President Deputy Secretary-General,Ho Chih-wei, and an unnamed Republic of China Armed Forces officer. In an interview with Taipei Times, he expressed sympathy for Taiwanese independence and claimed his travels were a "fact-finding mission." Nerdah Mya further denied personally ordering the execution of 25 POWs but stated that the event was not a war crime.
