= She Zhijiang =

Chinese gambling businessman

- 佘智江
- Born: 1982 (age 43–44); Shaodong, Hunan, China
- Other names: Tang Kriang Kai; She Lunkai; Dylan She
- Citizenship: Chinese (according to the PRC's Foreign Ministry); Cambodian (since 2017)
- Occupation: Businessman
- Organization: Yatai International Holdings Group
- Conviction: Illegal lottery business targeting Chinese online users (2014 in Shandong)
- Capture status: Detained

Details
- Date apprehended: 13 August 2022 (apprehended and imprisoned in Thailand); 10 November 2025 (extradited to China)
- Imprisoned at: Zhenjiang, China

She Zhijiang (Chinese: 佘智江; pinyin: Shé Zhìjiāng), known as Tang Kriang Kai (Khmer: តាំង គ្រាង ខាយ), and by numerous other aliases including She Lunkai, and Dylan She, (Note: She Zhijiang (佘智江) is his legal official name in China, while Tang Kriang Kai (តាំង គ្រាង ខាយ) is his official name in Cambodia.) is a Chinese Cambodian businessman. As the chairman of the Yatai International Holdings Group, he and his group has long been engaged in investment and operation in grey Industries such as the gambling industry in Southeast Asia. The main targets of these industries are Chinese citizens (China's strict prohibition on gambling has led to the rampant online gambling industry targeting Chinese citizens) and Southeast Asians. As a convicted criminal in China, She Zhijiang was a fugitive until his capture by Thai police in August 2022. His business operations have been linked with human trafficking, extortion, and cyber scams. On 10 November 2025 he was extradited to China.

== Early life ==
He was born in c. 1982 in Shaodong, Hunan, China.

== Business interests ==
His company, Yatai International Holdings Group (abbreviated Yatai IHG), is registered in Hong Kong and headquartered in Thailand. He became a fugitive in 2012, after fleeing Chinese authorities. In 2014, a Shandong court convicted him of running an illegal lottery business in the Philippines that targeted Chinese online users, and had netted US$298 million in profits.

In 2015, he began building a business in Cambodia, involved in the illicit business of helping Chinese gamblers front-load gambling bets made in Cambodian casinos. From there, he expanded his business interests to the Philippines and acquired ownership of one of Manila's largest spa and entertainment centers. In January 2017, he acquired Cambodian citizenship, during which he changed his name to Tang Kriang Kai. Cambodia's government grants citizenship to individuals who donate at least US$250,000 to the government. Between January 2018 and February 2021, he allegedly colluded to register gambling companies and recruited 330,000 gamblers, netting US$22.2 million in proceeds from gambling scams.

=== Foray into Myanmar ===
In 2017, Yatai received a conditional permit from the Myanmar Investment Commission to develop a small-scale housing estate in Shwe Kokko, near the Burmese-Thai border town of Myawaddy. The Nation alleged that Wan Kuok-koi, a former leader of the 14K syndicate, was a co-investor in the project.

Shwe Kokko is controlled by the Kayin State Border Guard Forces (BGF), consisting of former Democratic Karen Buddhist Army forces that were formally integrated into the Myanmar Armed Forces in 2010. In 2019, the Cambodian government banned online gambling, which had come to dominate the local economy in Sihanoukville. In response, Chinese casino and other illicit cyber scam operators quickly exited Cambodia, and found a new base at Yatai's development and similar Chinese-led developments like Saixigang and Huanya International New City Project, along Myanmar's borders.

In promotional materials, Yatai claimed to be developing a US$15 billion special economic zone called the Yatai New City, encompassing 120 square kilometres (46 sq mi). The scale of Yatai's ongoing development surpassed what had been approved by the Burmese government, prompting additional scrutiny from Burmese authorities. In 2020, Myanmar's civilian-led government formed a tribunal to investigate irregularities in the Yatai development project, successfully halting the project. Tensions between the Kayin State Border Guard Force and the Myanmar Armed Forces escalated over the development. The government of the People's Republic of China distanced itself from Yatai's development, after an expose on She was published by Caixin.

However, after the 2021 Myanmar coup d'état, during which the Burmese military deposed the civilian-led government, the military became pre-occupied with addressing the ensuing Myanmar civil war, enabling the development in Shwe Kokko, now a regional human trafficking and cyber scamming hub, to resume. Buildings have been converted into prison-like hubs from which cybercriminals run scams that target internet users around the world. In December 2023, the United Kingdom imposed sanctions on She Zhijiang for being linked to "forced labour schemes" in which "victims were trafficked to work for online scam farms".

== Arrest and detention in Thailand ==
On 13 August 2022, Thai police arrested She in Bangkok, with plans to extradite him to China to face criminal charges. After his appearance in a documentary for Al Jazeera he was moved out his detention center.

As of January 2025, he was being kept in Klong Prem Central Prison in Thailand, having been moved there from Bangkok Remand Prison in October 2024. His lawyers have claimed that he had been subjected to abuse in prison. It was reported that he had been kept in chains until early December 2024.

=== Self-proclaimed "Chinese spy" ===
Since being arrested by Thai police, She Zhijiang has repeatedly claimed that he is a Chinese spy and will be "killed" by the Chinese government "for political purposes". Through these statements, he sought not to be extradited to China to face trial.

In September 2024, She Zhijiang appeared in a Al Jazeera short documentary. He claimed to have been recruited by the Chinese government in 2016 while in the Philippines. In this documentary, he also alleged former Philippine mayor Alice Guo who governed the town of Bamban in the Philippines is also a Chinese spy "just like him". He called on Guo to admit her "spy identity" as soon as possible. He expressed his hope to "cooperate" with the Philippine government. Alice Guo denied knowing She Zhijiang in House of Representatives inquiries and Senate hearings.

== Extradition to China ==
On November 10, 2025, Thailand's Office of the Attorney General announced that the appeal court had upheld ruling approving She Zhijiang's extradition to China. She was transferred from the Bangkok Remand Prison to a detention facility at Suvarnabhumi Police Station before being handed over to the Chinese police.

On November 12, She was escorted to Nanjing Lukou International Airport by airplane.

== See also ==
- Human trafficking in Myanmar
- Fraud factory
- Scam center
- Duan Zhengli
- Li Kuong
