= Shwe Kokko =

Shwe Kokko Myaing ရွှေကုက္ကိုမြိုင် Shwe Kokko
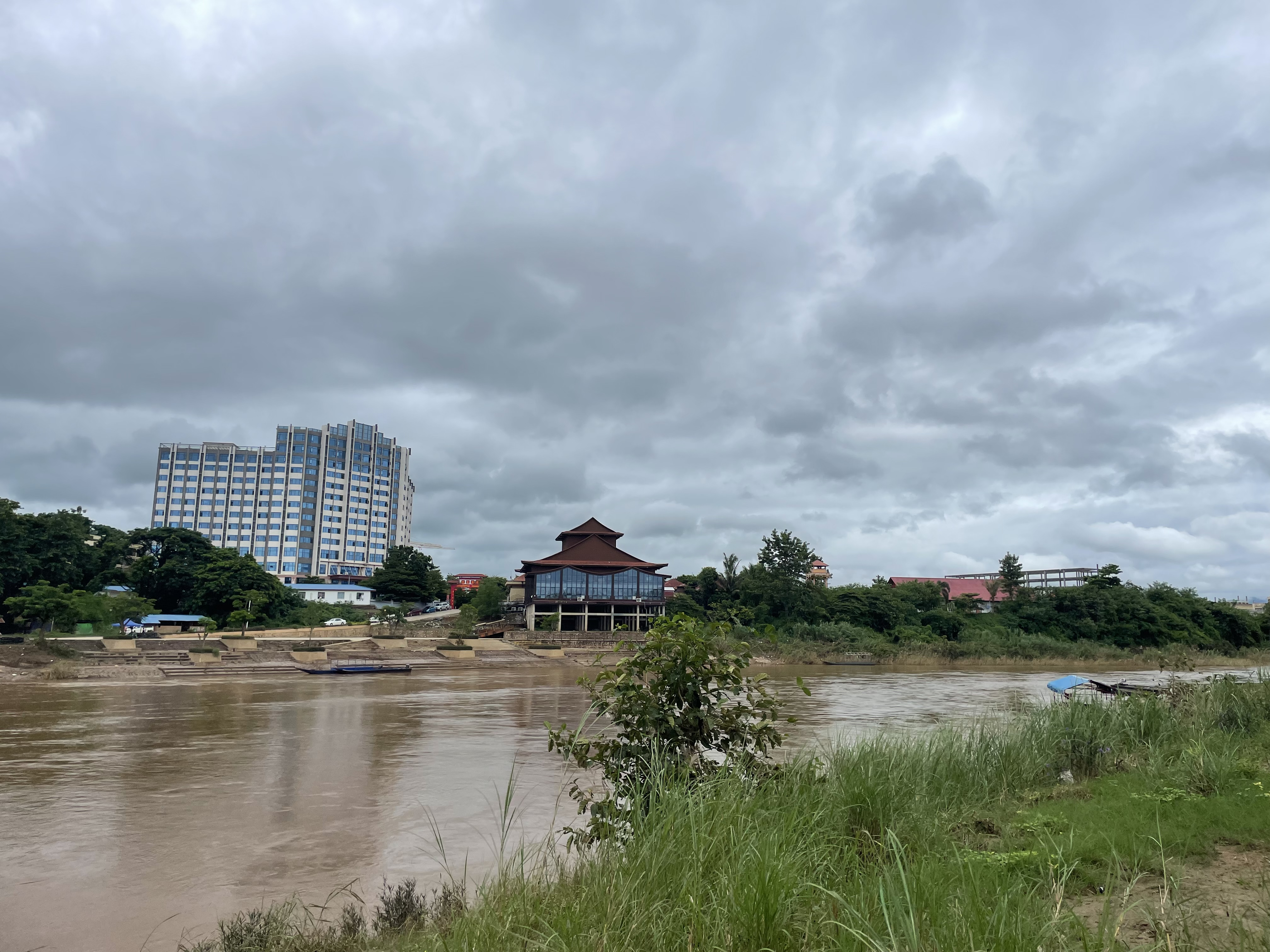
- Shwe Kokko in 2022

- Location in Myanmar
- Coordinates: 16°49′13.7″N 98°31′51.3″E
- Country: Myanmar
- State: (Kayin State) Karen State
- District: Myawaddy District
- Township: Myawaddy Township

Population
  - Religions: Buddhism and Christianity
- Time zone: UTC+6.30 (MST)

Shwe Kokko Myaing (Burmese: ရွှေကုက္ကိုမြိုင်; lit. 'golden raintree forest', Eastern Pwo Karen: ထိက်တုဂ်ဓံင့်), commonly known as Shwe Kokko (Burmese: ရွှေကုက္ကို, Chinese: 水沟谷; pinyin: Shuǐgōugǔ, Jyutping: seoi2 gau1 guk1), is a town in Myawaddy Township, Myawaddy District in the Kayin State of south-east Myanmar. Shwe Kokko lies on the left (western) bank of the Moei River (Thaungyin River), facing Thailand to the east. The town is located 20 kilometres (12 mi) north of Myawaddy. In recent years, Shwe Kokko has evolved into an organized crime and human trafficking hub, due to the Burmese government's limited reach and oversight in this remote area. Chinese-led development projects in Shwe Kokko, including Yatai New City, have been involved in illegal gambling, human trafficking, extortion, and cyber scam operations.

== Administration ==
Shwe Kokko is home to the headquarters of the Kayin State Border Guard Force (BGF), which consists of former Democratic Karen Buddhist Army forces that were formally integrated into the Myanmar Armed Forces in August 2010. The Kayin State BGF is led by Colonel Saw Chit Thu, and has about 6,000 troops that are organised into 13 battalions.

After splitting away from the Tatmadaw, the KNA started acquiring revenue via taxation of gambling and scam businesses in Shwe Kokko. Almost 1,000 foreign workers of scam centers were turned over to Chinese authorities.

== Development projects ==
In 2018 and 2019, the Cambodian government banned online casino gambling, forcing Chinese investors and crime syndicates to exit Sihanoukville, which had previously seen a major casino boom. In 2019, multiple casinos shifted their operations to Shwe Kokko.

Shwe Kokko is home to Yatai New City (Chinese: 亞太新城; pinyin: Yàtài xīnchéng; Jyutping: aa3 taai3 san1 sing4 lit. 'Asia-Pacific New City'), as a partnership between Chit Lin Myaing Company and Yatai International Holdings Group (Yatai IHG), which is a regional online gambling operation owned by Chinese fugitive She Zhijiang. Chit Lin Myaing is owned by the Kayin State Border Guard Force, and will receive 30% of profits from this development, with the remainder of the profits going to Yatai. The Nation alleged that Wan Kuok-koi, a former leader of the 14K syndicate, was a co-investor in the project.

In 2019, Singaporean-owned Building Cities Beyond Blockchain became Yatai's exclusive blockchain partner. The use of blockchain technology enables entities to circumvent government authorities, obscure financial transactions, and launder money.

Yatai portrayed the development as a US$15 billion special economic zone (SEZ), aimed at becoming a playground for Chinese gamblers near the Burmese-Thai border. In reality, Shwe Kokko is not an approved SEZ, which are established in accordance with Myanmar's SEZ laws. In October 2020, China's government officially distanced itself from the project. China's ambassador to Myanmar, Chen Hai, clarified this project was not part of the Belt and Road Initiative.

== Controversies ==
=== Yatai project ===
The Yatai project has been the subject of significant controversy, owing to concerns over the absence of official approval, illegal land confiscations, casino construction, criminal activities, money laundering, and local sentiment. Yatai began large-scale construction in 2017, even though the Myanmar Investment Commission had only approved a small-scale project covering 180,000 acres (73,000 ha). MIC had only granted permission for the construction of 59 luxury villas on 22.5 acres of land, but the actual construction has far outpaced the permitted development.

The project utilized thousands of Chinese workers, despite claims that it would generate job opportunities for locals. In June 2020, the Burmese government established a national tribunal to investigate irregularities surrounding this development project, successfully halting the project. In 2020, tensions between the Kayin State Border Guard Force and the Myanmar Armed Forces escalated over the development.

However, after the 2021 Myanmar coup d'état, during which the Burmese military deposed the civilian-led government, the military became pre-occupied with addressing the ensuing Myanmar civil war, enabling the Yatai development to resume. In April 2023, the Kawthoolei Army, a splinter group of the Karen National Union, launched an offensive against the Kayin State BGF in Shwe Kokko, forcing over 10,000 people to flee into Thailand.

=== Criminal activities ===
As Cambodia intensified its crackdown on illegal online gambling in 2019, Chinese crime syndicates and casino operators have expanded their presence in Myanmar's peripheral border areas.

As of May 2022, 1,225 Chinese nationals were legally residing in Shwe Kokko, and thousands of illegal Chinese workers migrated to the village for work. Shwe Kokko is the destination of many Asian human trafficking victims, from countries such as Thailand, Cambodia, Laos, Malaysia, Hong Kong, Taiwan, India and Philippines, who have been forced to work in Shwe Kokko in online scam operations run by Chinese crime syndicates, lured by the prospect of romance and well-paying jobs. In September 2022, over 300 Indian nationals were reported to be held hostage in Shwe Kokko.

Since the Karen BGF cut ties with the Tatmadaw and rebranded itself to the Karen National Army, many of these centers clamped down on abusive working conditions under the threat of a potential crackdown from anti-Junta forces. However, the scamming workforce and targets expanded to speakers of English and other languages. Stricter security measures largely impede blackmailed workers from escaping, with rescued East African victims alluding to slave-like conditions. Rescued East African victims interviewed in Addis Ababa, explained that underperformers were punished. Tens of thousands of Chinese continued to work in the area, but the workforce became increasingly multinational.

In February 2025, following pressure from Chinese officials, Thailand cut cross-border power transmission from Thailand to Myanmar as well as exports of fuel supplies. In response, the armed groups controlling border areas in Myanmar where online crime sites are located staged a series of raids on these sites, and over the following months removed thousands of people and handed them to Thai authorities. From Thailand they were processed and repatriated to their home countries. According to data published by the United Nations Office on Drugs and Crime, people of over two dozen nationalities were swept up in these raids and deported. Many alleged they were trafficked and subject to violence in the scam parks. Myanmar authorities said in June 2026 that 63 buildings in Shwe Kokko used for online scam and gambling operations had been demolished as of 23 June, with a further 14 structures scheduled for demolition.

The expansion of the Yatai New City is an extreme manifestation of the growth of organized crime groups in the region involved in casinos, online gambling and fraud, and other illicit industries. Speaking on this trend, the United Nations Office on Drugs and Crime noted: "The most visible example is Myanmar, where organized crime groups collaborate extensively with militias and armed groups that operate in the country's lawless border regions. The money from transnational crime directly undermines peace and stability. Open conflict or not, the challenge to the rule of law in each is real and growing."

=== International sanctions ===
One of the key figures behind the development of Yatai New City is She Zhijiang, a Chinese-born businessman who later acquired Cambodian nationality. She Zhijiang was arrested in Thailand in 2022 on an international arrest warrant and was extradited to China in 2025 to face charges. He is wanted there for over a decade on charges of running illegal gambling operations. A company owned by the Karen Border Guard Force is a shareholder in the project. In 2023, leaders of the border guard force, Saw Chit Thu and Saw Min Min Oo, along with She Zhijiang were sanctioned by the United Kingdom due to their links to the project and its involvement in trafficking, forced criminality and torture. In 2024 the European Union sanctioned Saw Chit Thu, Saw Tin Win, Saw Mote Thone and Chit Linn Myaing Group, specifically referencing their involvement in the Yatai project. In September 2025 the Office of Foreign Assets Control of the United States Department of the Treasury sanctioned nine targets operating in Shwe Kokko, as part of a wider action against scam centre networks in Southeast Asia.

== See also ==
- Special Economic Zone
  - Gelephu Special Administrative Region, in Bhutan on border with India
  - Dawei SAR, in coastal Myanmar
  - Kyaukphyu SAR, in coastal Myanmar
  - Thilawa Special Economic Zone, in coastal Myanmar
  - Mong La SAR, in eastcentral Myanmar on border with China
- KK Park, collective name for the fraud factories in Myawaddi city of Myanmar
