= Swedish Civil War (1438–1439) =

| Date | 1438–1439 |
| Location | Sweden |
| Result | Victory for Karl Knutsson |
| Territorial changes | Stegeborg, Nyköpingshus, Älvsborg, and Kalmar are conquered by Karl Knutsson |

Belligerents
| Forces under Karl Knutsson | Forces under Nils Stensson; Forces under Eric of Pomerania Kristiern Nilsson |

Commanders and leaders
| Karl Knutsson; Herman Berman; Erengisle Nilsson | Nils Stensson # Kristiern Nilsson (POW); Erik of Pomerania |

Units involved
| Unknown | Stegeborg garrison Nyköpingshus garrison Älvsborg garrison Axevall garrison Kastelholm garrison Kalmar garrison |

Strength
| Unknown | Unknown, but large |

Casualties and losses
| Unknown | Unknown |

The Swedish Civil War of 1438–1439, also called Karl Knutsson's private war against rebellious fortress commanders (Swedish: Karl Knutssons privatkrig mot uppstudsiga borgherrar), was a private civil war waged by Karl Knutsson against several commanders of different fortresses around Sweden whom had refused to swear fealty to him.

== Background ==
Karl Knutsson was a warlord with the main goal being personal power, and nobody was allowed to stand in his way. Once all major peasant rebellions had ended, he would be able to launch a private war against his competitors for power.

Nils Stensson was married to one of Karl Knutsson's sisters, however, by the end of the 1430s, the brother-in-laws began quarreling, which lead to Karl Knutsson attempting to deprive Nils of his castle, Stegeborg. Nils refused this decision, and remained in Stegeborg. Attempts by Bishop Thomas to mediate also failed, which led to a private civil war breaking out between Nils and Karl.

== War ==
Nils agitated among the Östgötar and managed to gather support from them, but he was also aware that Karl's army was on its way. In response, Nils pillaged large parts of Östergötland in order to stock up as many supplies as possible in Stegeborg, which was not popular among the common folk in the province.

Karl Knutsson gained the upper hand, he sent troops under Herman Berman and Erengisle Nilsson to besiege the castle from both sea and land. The number of defenders inside is unknown, although they had 14 föglare (Veuglaire), which they used during the siege. Initially, he failed to take the fortress, with the first siege lasting 8 weeks, in the Rhymed chronicle, the people inside suffered from hunger and thirst while those on the outside had food and drink in abundance, along maidens, dancers and musicians. However, later, after a few months, the supplies inside ran out, and the defenders promptly surrendered, with Nils being able to escape to Gotland, where the former king Eric of Pomerania entered him into his service and appointed him as the Marshal of Sweden, without any real power. Nils was also accompanied by his brothers Bo and Bengt.

During this time, Karl Knutsson's troops had begun besieging Nyköpingshus, Älvsborg, Axevall, Kastelholm, and Kalmar, five other fortresses that had refused to recognize Karl Knutsson's power. Nyköpingshus fell after a meeting, along with Älvsborg, with Axevall and Kalmar holding out, along with the old fortress of Kastelholm. An important part of Karl Knutssons private war was also to break Kristiern Nilsson of the Vasa dynasty. Kristiern was Seneschal of the Realm and therefore held the most powerful job aside from the marshal Karl Knutsson, Kristiern was also more sympathetic to the Kalmar Union than Karl was. Due to Kristierns' contacts with Karl Knutssons own high noble circles, and thus a highly dangerous competitor to Karl.

Karl Knutsson was quickly able to manoeuver Kristiern away from the power in Stockholm in a peaceful manner, but this wasn't enough, since Kristiern was still a threat because of the aforementioned good contacts with the high nobility. Kristiern was also the commander of Viborg, and had begun allying with the local Finnish peasant leaders. In January 1439, Karl Knutsson's forces attacked Rävelsta in Uppland, where Kristiern was currently situated, there had been a party there, with many being drunk, which lead to few casualties in Karl Knutsson's forces, while the people at Rävelsta were cut down. Kristiern was pulled out into the winter night to be sent to a cell on Västerås Castle.

After his escape to Gotland, Nils would soon return with a well-equipped large force on Eric's ship to Stegeborg, and Eric also urged the Swedish congregations to obey Nils and no one else until he could return himself. Nils quickly captured Söderköping, and he would then send his men into the countryside. The Vadstendiariet and other sources speak of their progress there. However, after a couple of weeks, the fortunes turned for Nils and he fled back to Gotland. However, Östergötland had not been completely lost to his cause.

At the end of July, Nils returned to Stegeborg, this time accompanied by Eric and a considerable force of troops, apparently hoping to regain his power in Sweden. Nils once again succeeded in conquering Östergötland. In August, Karl Knutsson found himself compelled to write to the bourgeoisie in Vadstena, threatening the fall of the town if they didn't cease cooperation with Nils. Eric would subsequently have little success, choosing to return to Gotland after around a month. When the council sent Nils a formal letter of dsmissal, Nils, during a gathering at Tälje, promised to separate his case from the king's. He would then surrender Stegeborg to the council and Karl, after which they also seized Kalmar. Despite this, they did not fully trust Nils' loyalty. After a visit to Gotland, him and his entourage were ambushed on the road between Norrköping and Söderköping, in the ensuing battle, Nils was captured and taken to Norrköping, after which he is said to have died from the plague, and some of his men being beheaded in Söderköping.

== Aftermath ==
After Kristiern Nilsson was released, he went to Viborg and joined Christopher of Bavaria in 1441, however, shortly before his death, he reconciled with Karl Knutsson.

== Works cited ==
- Adolfsson, Mats (2007). När borgarna brann [When the castles burned] (in Swedish). Natur & Kultur. pp. 237–240. ISBN 9789127026315.
