= Kawthoolei Army =

Ethnic armed organisation in Myanmar

- Leader: General Saw Nerdah Mya – General Officer Commanding (GOC.) Lieutenant General Saw Hsar Gay Po – Vice Chief of Staff (VCS.)
- Dates active: 16 July 2022 – present
- Split from: Karen National Union
- Country: Kawthoolei
- Active regions: Kayin State; Mon State; Tanintharyi Region; Myanmar-Thailand border
- Ideology: Karen nationalism; Self-determination; separatism
- Size: 200+

The Kawthoolei Army (Burmese: ကော်သူးလေ တပ်မတော်; abbr. KTLA) is a militant and separatist group in Myanmar, split from Karen National Union.

The formation of the new militia was announced on 19 July 2022. General Nerdah Mya, former head of the Karen National Defence Organisation (KNDO), had been removed from his KNDO position after allegations that his KNDO troops killed 25 suspected Burmese military spies in southern Karen State.

In April 2023, the KTLA launched an offensive against the Kayin State BGF in Shwe Kokko, forcing over 10,000 people to flee into Thailand. On 21 May, the KTLA, alongside other anti-junta forces, launched offensives against the Tatmadaw's "Plato" and Maw Khee camps, south of Myawaddy.

The KTLA is reportedly associated with an Italian neo-fascist group CasaPound through the group "Popoli Onlus Solidarity Community".

According to the Bangkok Post, the KTLA claims to control a 40km-long pipeline owned by PTT Exploration and Production that transports gas from Myanmar into Thailand's Kanchanaburi Province. The KTLA is reportedly considering either shutting down or destroying the pipeline.

== Quasi-state ==
The Kawthoolei Army established in November 2023 the Kawthoolei Government and renamed it on the 5 January 2026 as the Republic of Kawthoolei.

The proclamation marks a divergence from the political stance of the Karen National Union (KNU), the primary political organization representing the Karen people, which advocates for a federal democratic union within Myanmar rather than complete secession. The KNU calls the "liberated" territory within Myanmar it administers as Kawthoolei. As of January 2026, the state remains unrecognized by the international community, and the Karen National Union has publicly rejected the KTLA's proclamation.

=== History ===
==== Proclamation of independence ====
In November 2023 the Kawthoolei Government was established, on the 5 January 2026 it was renamed into the Republic of Kawthoolei and declerad independence. The proclamation cited the failure of the Myanmar military junta to protect civilian rights as the primary justification for secession. Nerdah Mya was named President, and Poe Thulay was named Prime Minister of the provisional government.

Kawthoolei has proclaimed that it will be democratic, with a free-market economic structure. The new administration said it intends to uphold peace and cooperation and has called on other countries to recognize the Republic. Nerdah Mya has announced plans to create a constitution and has already announced the creation of a provisional government, including prime minister Poe Thulay and other cabinet members.

=== Relationships ===
==== Karen National Union ====
General Nerdah Mya was formerly the head of the Karen National Defence Organisation (KNDO), a wing of the Karen National Union (KNU), but was dismissed in 2022 after the KNU found him guilty of extrajudicial killings of construction workers alleged to be spies, three days after he formed the splinter group KTLA.

Following the January 2026 proclamation, the KNU, which advocates for a federal state, publicly dismissed the declaration. Padoh Saw Taw Nee, the KNU spokesperson, characterized the move as "nonsense", arguing that the KTLA lacks both significant territorial control and the civil administration infrastructure necessary to govern a state.

Since March 2026, the KNLA accused KTLA units under the command of Colonel Kaw La Phoe (Ai Khwe) of collaborating with the Tatmadaw and attacking Brigade 4 in Tanintharyi Region. Furthermore, KNU officials alleges that KTLA carries out extortion and attacks against civilian and humanitarian aid distribution, including a 22 April attack where a child was killed.

On 4 May 2026, 37 KTLA members defected to KNLA Brigade 4 in Tanintharyi Region.
