= Taipei WEGO Private Senior High School =

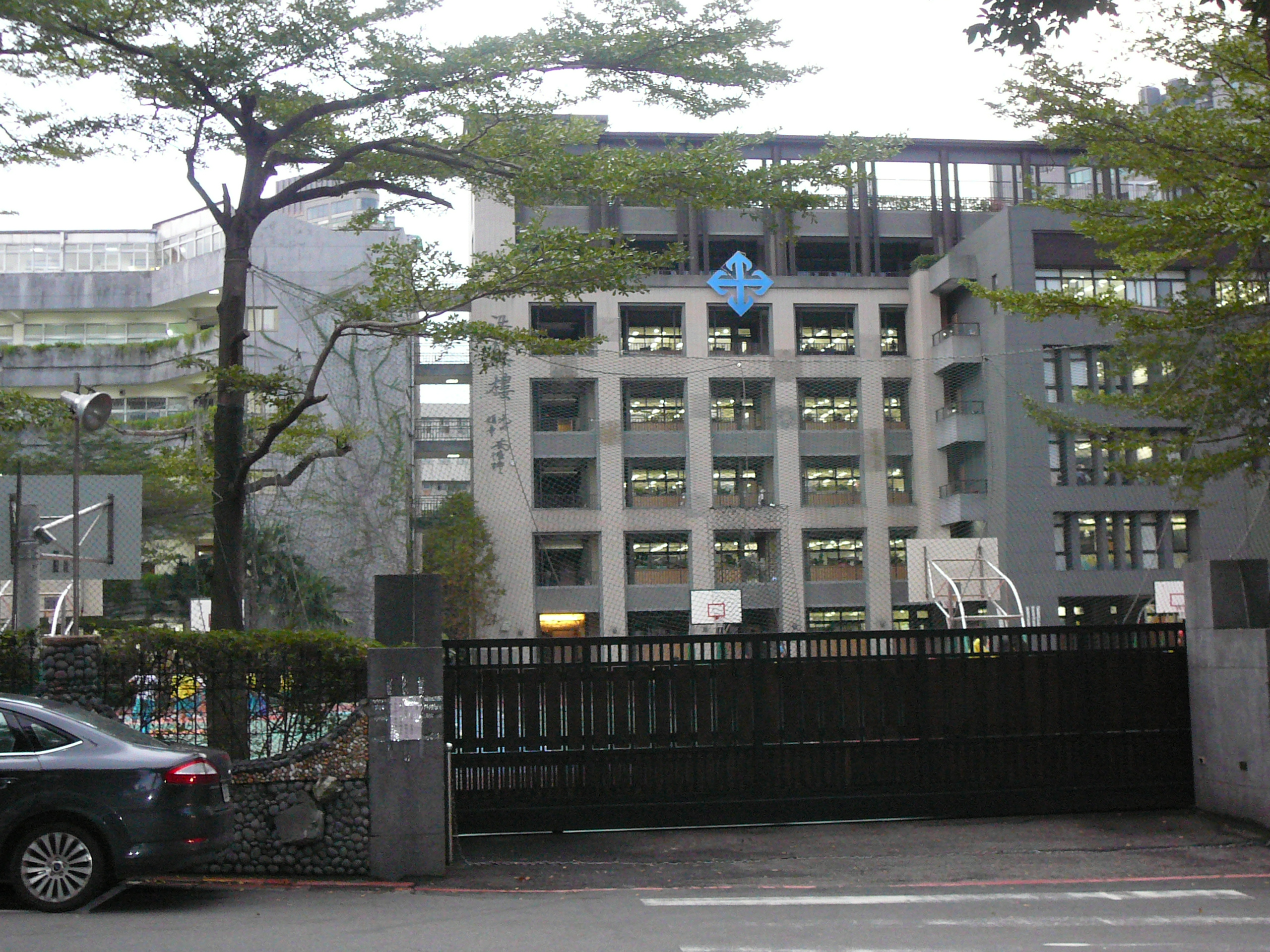
- 55 Zhuhai Road, Beitou District, Taipei

Information
- Type: Private high school
- Established: 11 November 1993
- Principal: 孫明峯
- Information: (02)2891-8004
- Website: http://www.wghs.tp.edu.tw/

The Taipei WEGO Private Senior High School (Chinese: 臺北市私立薇閣高級中學) is a private senior high school which located at Beitou, Taipei, Taiwan.

It contains high school and secondary school. The secondary school enrolls 13 to 14 classes every year. In 2017, the secondary school established a 13th class (Class De), which is an international class. In 2019, a new international class was added to the ninth grade class and became class 14 (5 class for the external examination class; 6 class for the direct promotion class and 2 class for the international class). The total number of students in one grade of junior high school is approximately 600.

The senior high school enrolls eight to nine classes every year, among which Class Wu is a math and science gifted class, Class Geng established in 2012 is an international class, Class Ji established in 2014 is a natural science experimental class, and Class Xin established in 2017 is an international class or Ordinary class, the Ren class established in 2020 is an ordinary class. The total number of students in one grade of senior high school is approximately 410. Mainly adopts separate admissions system. More than 90% of senior high school freshmen each year are directly from the secondary part of the school.

== School History ==
Taipei Private Wego Senior High School was formerly known as the private Zhuhai Senior Commercial Vocational School. It was founded by the Guangdong warlord Jitang Chen. He also founded the Zhuhai College of the same name in Hong Kong. This school was recognized by the Ministry of Education of the Republic of China, so it is called "Private Zhuhai University" in Taiwan and was later acquired by the board of directors of the private Wego Primary School. After Zhuhai High School ceased enrollment, it was restructured into Taipei Private Wego Senior High School on November 11, 1993, and enrollment began on August 1, 1994. The chairman of the board is Mr. Chuanhong Lee. The first principal was Mr. Youwei Huang, and the second principal was Mr. Guanglun Lee.
