= Saw Chit Thu =

Karen military officer

Thiri Pyanchi Saw Chit Thu
- စောချစ်သူ
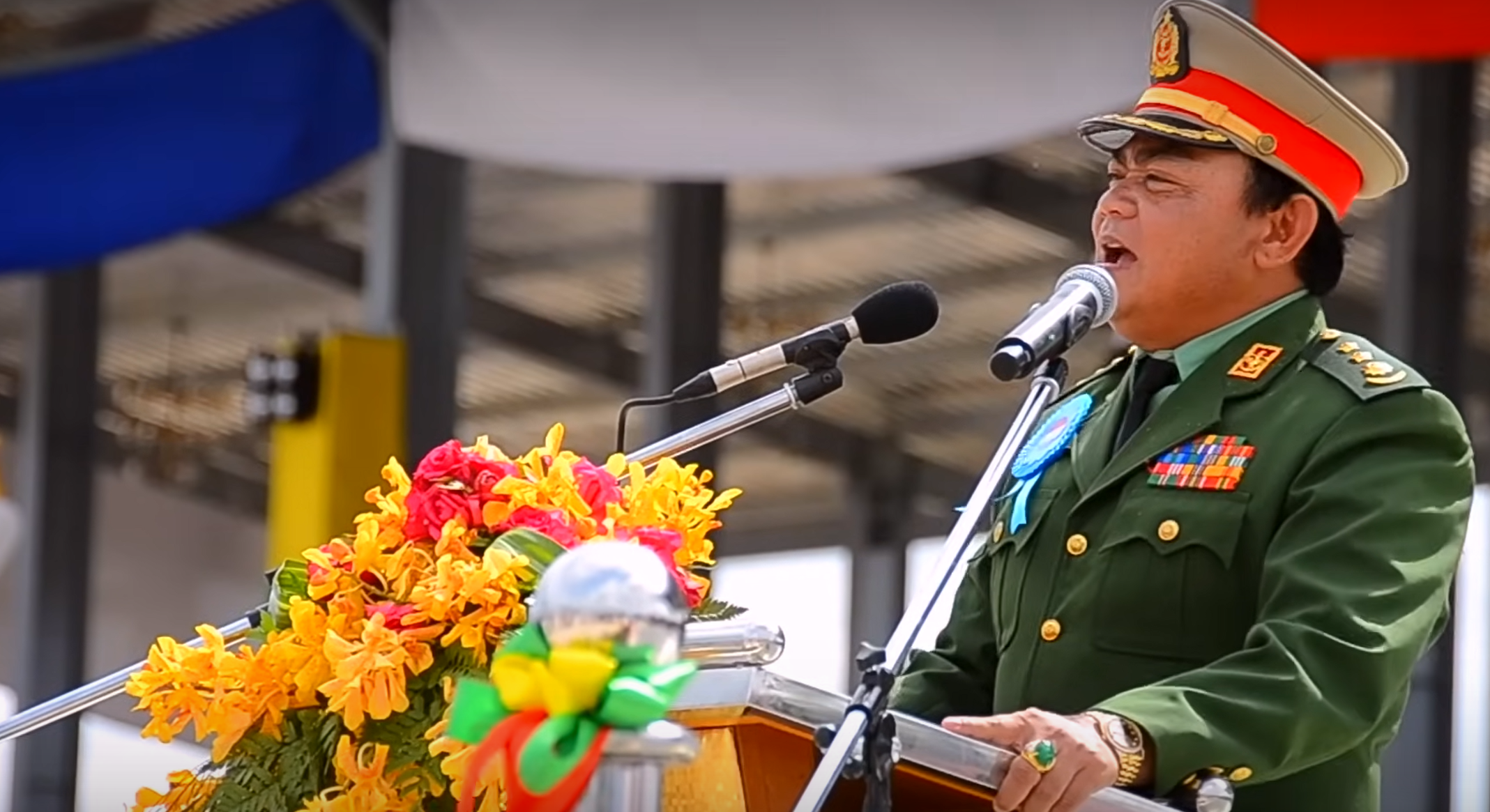
- Saw Chit Thu during a speech

Leader of the Karen National Army
- Incumbent
- Assumed office 19 February 2024

Personal details
- Born: San Myint; December 15, 1969 (age 56) Kyar Inn village, Hlaingbwe, Karen State, Myanmar (Burma)
- Spouse: Nan Khin Hla Thu
- Children: Saw Htoo Eh Moo; Saw Chit Chit; Nan Hnin Nandar Aye
- Occupation: Soldier, businessperson
- Awards: Thiri Pyanchi (awarded November 2022)

Military service
- Allegiance: Myanmar
- Branch/service: Karen National Army; Border Guard Forces; Democratic Karen Buddhist Army
- Years of service: 1994–present
- Rank: Colonel
- Unit: Former commander of DKBA Battalion 999; Border Guard Forces; KNA
- Battles/wars: Myanmar civil war (2021–present)

Colonel Saw Chit Thu (Burmese: စောချစ်သူ) is a Karen soldier and businessman, sometimes identified as a warlord, who has held a leading position in armed groups in Karen State, Myanmar, including the Democratic Karen Buddhist Army (DKBA), the Border Guard Forces (BGF) and the Karen National Army (KNA). He is considered a powerful figure in the border area, and has been sanctioned by the United Kingdom and the United States for links to projects which use trafficked and forced labour in online scam farms.

== Early life ==
Saw Chit Thu was born on 15 December 1969 in Kyar Inn village, Hlaingbwe Township, Karen State. He was previously known as San Myint, and adopted the pseudonym Saw Chit Thu.

== Military career ==
Saw Chit Thu was a colonel in the Karen National Union (KNU) / Karen National Liberation Army (KNLA) and close ally of General Tin Maung, commander of the KNU/KNLA's 7th Brigade. In 1994, a faction of Buddhist Karen soldiers broke away from the predominantly Christian-led KNU, and established Democratic Karen Buddhist Army (DKBA) in the following year. The event dealt a serious blow to the KNU. Saw Chit Thu is a former commander of DKBA Battalion 999, and led the DKBA troops in the Battle of Kawmoora. In return, he received control over Kawmoora and timber trade rights along the Moei River, particularly in Shwe Kokko.

In the spring of 1998, he was accused of leading DKBA attacks on Karen civilians in refugee camps in Thailand. Among the DKBA leaders, he is believed to the most powerful decision-maker in both the DKBA's military wing and its political administration. He also owns large businesses dealing with logging and auto trading, and he is rumored to be involved in drug trafficking. In 2010, he accepted the Burmese government’s demands to transform the DKBA into a Border Guard Force, under the command of the Tatmadaw. The majority of BGF troops operating in Karen State are from the DKBA faction.

Saw Chit Thu is the founder and former chairman of Chit Lin Myaing Company, a major conglomerate run by the BGF. The company has claimed significant projects and been granted special permits in Kayin State. In 2017, Saw Chit Thu began working with Yatai International Holding Group, led by Chinese convict, She Zhijiang, to develop Yatai New City in Shwe Kokko, after She gave Chit Thu a down payment of US$300,000. He also linked a deal with the Dongmei Group, led by Chinese triad leader, Wan Kuok-koi, to develop Saixigang. In June 2020, the civilian-led government launched a tribunal to investigate the Yatai development, successfully halting ongoing construction. The probe embarrassed the Myanmar Armed Forces, which oversees Saw Chit Thu's BGF.

In January 2021, the Tatmadaw pressured Saw Chit Thu and other high-ranking officers, including Saw Mout Thon and Saw Tin Win, to resign from the BGF. Saw Mout Thon resigned on January 8, along with 13 commanders, 77 officers, and 13 battalions from 4 regiments who collectively signed and submitted their resignations. Amid controversy and under pressure, at least 7,000 BGF members resigned to protest the ouster of their top leaders. However, Saw refused to retire.

In the aftermath of the 2021 Myanmar coup d'état, the Myanmar Armed Forces have become preoccupied with the ensuing Myanmar civil war (2021–present), which has enabled the Yatai New City to resume development. After the death of Lieutenant Colonel Saw Kyaw Myint from COVID-19 in July 2021, Saw Chit Thu succeeded him as the Garrison Commander of Border Guard Force (BGF) Battalion No. 3. As commander of the BGF's 3rd Battalion, he controlled northern Myawaddy, while Lieutenant Colonel Saw Mote Thone, commander of the 2nd Battalion, controlled southern Myawaddy. In November 2022, he was awarded the title of Thiri Pyanchi, one of the country’s highest honors. In December 2023, the United Kingdom imposed sanctions on Saw Chit Thu for being linked to "forced labor schemes" in which "victims were trafficked to work for online scam farms."

On 23 January 2024, Saw Chit Thu told the media that he discussed with Lt. Gen. Soe Win, the Deputy Commander-in-Chief, that the Border Guard Force (BGF), would no longer wish to accept money and supplies from the military. They aim to stand independently, and he also claimed that they don't want to fight against their fellow Karen people.

In response to this surprise announcement, long-time Myanmar analyst David Scott Mathieson noted that:

Even Saw Chit Thu has made a dramatic realignment, recently ending his alliance with the military, and after first attempting to retire in Yangon and Mandalay, then declaring “autonomy” in a stunning turn after 30 years of being the Sit-Tat’s hired thug. Chit Thu claims the decision was prompted by “Karen not wanting to kill other Karen.” This may apply to some of the BGF personnel, but Chit Thu has been murdering other Karen since 1994, so to assume he had a recent change of heart is a contemptible canard. After three decades of the DKBA, then BGF, burning down refugee camps, drug dealing, land grabbing and conniving with Chinese gangsters to create the monstrosity of Shwe Kokko casino and the scam centers, Chit Thu should be in the top five defendants at any eventual Karen State War Crimes Trial.

On 19 February 2024, Saw Chit Thu dissolved the Karen BGF and reformed it into the Karen National Army (KNA).

On 5 May 2025, the United States Department of the Treasury issued sanctions against Saw Chit Thu and his two sons, citing their role in organizing scam centers, human trafficking and smuggling across borders as KNA/BGF leaders.

== Personal life ==
Saw Chit Thu is married to Nan Khin Hla Thu, and has two sons, Saw Htoo Eh Moo and Saw Chit Chit, and one daughter, Nan Hnin Nandar Aye.
