= Karen National Army =

Armed group in Myanmar

- ကရင်အမျိုးသားတပ်မတော်
- Flag of the Myanmar Border Guard Forces and the Democratic Karen Buddhist Army, both used by the Karen National Army
- Leader: Colonel Saw Chit Thu
- Dates active: 11 January 2024–present
- Headquarters: Shwe Kokko
- Active regions: Kayin State
- Size: 10,000
- Wars: the Internal conflict in Myanmar

The Karen National Army, (Burmese: ကရင်အမျိုးသားတပ်မတော်; abbreviated KNA) formerly the Karen Border Guard Force (Karen BGF), is a primarily Karen Buddhist ethnic army active in Kayin State, Myanmar, which split off from the Myanmar Army in January 2024. The KNA was formed as the Democratic Karen Buddhist Army (DKBA) in December 1994 after the insurgent group split off of the Karen National Liberation Army. Shortly after, the DKBA signed a ceasefire agreement with the Myanmar Army, officially joining the army as the Karen Border Guard Force (Karen BGF) alongside the Karen Peace Force in 2009. In January 2024, after intensified rebel operations throughout Myanmar, the Karen BGF began distancing itself from the ruling military junta, eventually splitting off from the Army and rebranding themselves the "Karen National Army" by April. The transition was completed on 1 January 2026.

== Background ==
=== DKBA ===
The Democratic Karen Buddhist Army (DKBA; Burmese: တိုးတက်သော ဗုဒ္ဓဘာသာ ကရင်အမျိုးသား တပ်ဖွဲ့) was an insurgent group of Buddhist soldiers and officers in Myanmar that split from the predominantly Christian-led Karen National Liberation Army (KNLA), one of the largest rebel factions in Myanmar. Shortly after splitting from the KNLA in December 1994, the DKBA signed a ceasefire agreement with the government of Myanmar in exchange for military and financial assistance; provided that it supported government offensives against the KNU (the political wing of the KNLA) and its allies.

In 2009, the DKBA officially joined the Burmese Army as a Border Guard Force. The DKBA (known officially as the Karen Border Guard Force) worked primarily as an auxiliary force in Kayin State for the next 13 years until 2024, when tensions with the ruling military junta of Myanmar grew. In January 2024, the Karen BGF began distancing itself from the ruling military junta, eventually splitting off from the army and rebranding themselves as the Karen National Army in April.

The DKBA was formed for a variety of reasons. A Buddhist monk named U Thuzana had started a campaign in 1992 of constructing pagodas in Karen State, including at the KNU headquarters of Manerplaw. As the KNU leadership would not grant permission for construction of the pagodas, claiming they would attract government air strikes, Thuzana began to encourage KNLA soldiers to desert the organisation. Following a couple skirmishes and failed negotiations in early December 1994, the DKBA announced its formation and its split from the KNU on 1 January 1995. On January 27th, 1995, the DKBA assisted the SLORC in seizing Manerplaw, temporarily leaving the KNU without a headquarters. Its political wing composed of Buddhist officers, Democratic Karen Buddhist Organisation, was established on 21 December 1994.

=== Karen BGF ===
In 2010, a powerful commander of DKBA Saw Chit Thu accepted the Burma government's demands to transform itself into the Border Guard Force, under the command of the Tatmadaw and serving as the leader.

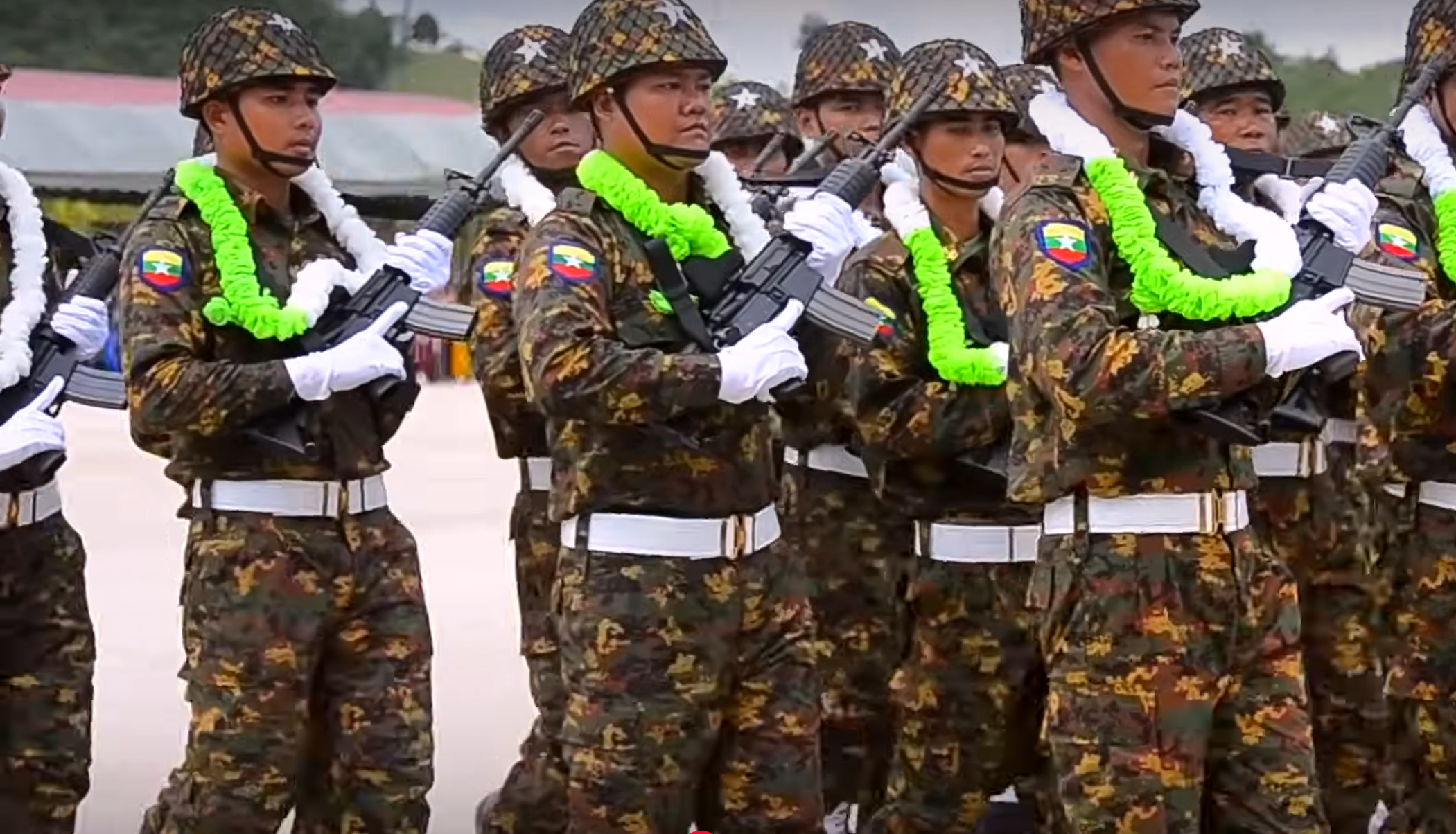
Karen BGF members marching

== Tensions with junta and rebranding ==
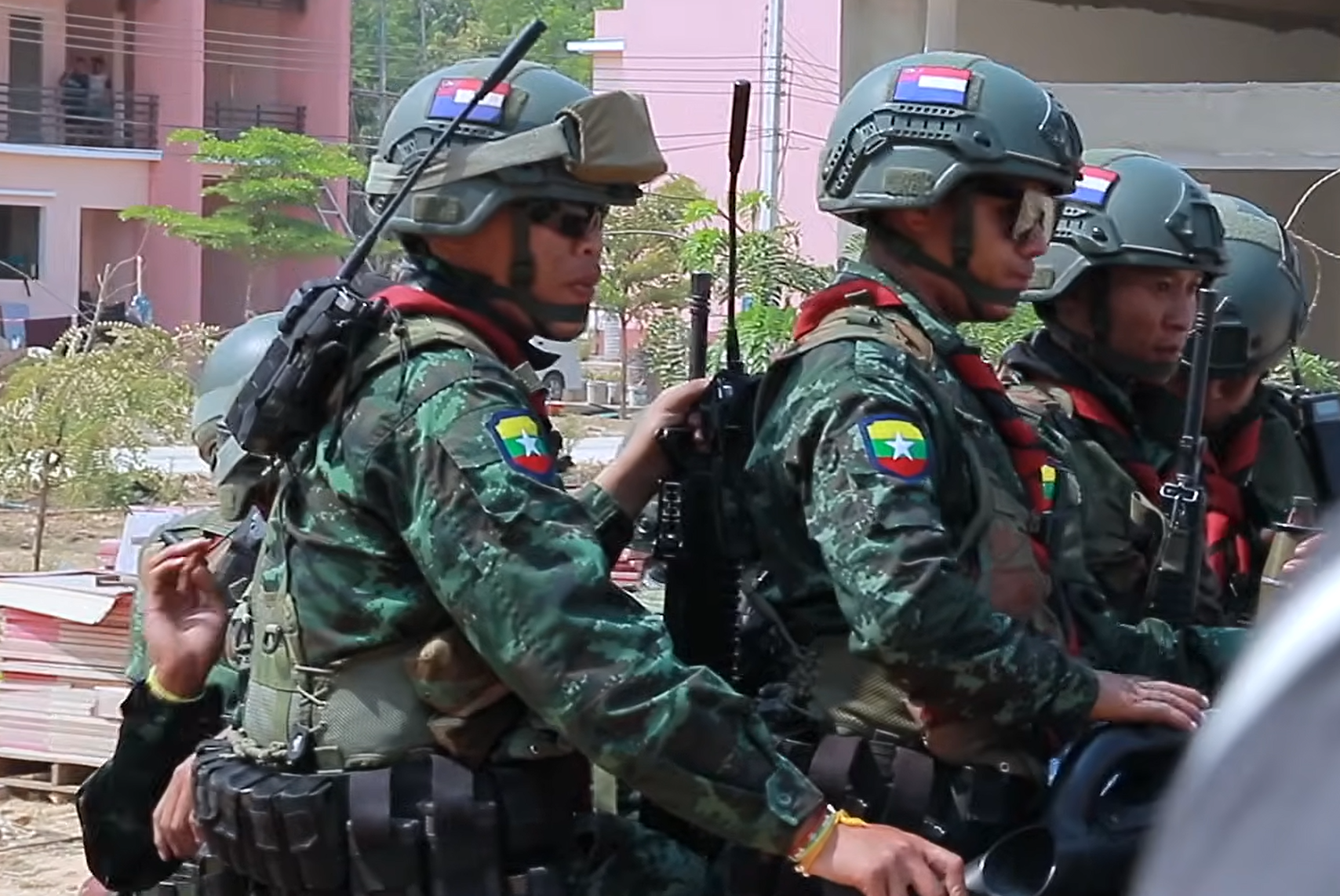
KNA forces in Myawaddy

In January 2021, the Tatmadaw pressured Saw Chit Thu and other high-ranking officers, including Major Saw Mout Thon and Major Saw Tin Win, to resign from the BGF. Major Saw Mout Thon of BGF Battalion 1022 resigned on January 8, along with 13 commanders, 77 officers, and 13 battalions from 4 regiments who collectively signed and submitted their resignations. Amid controversy and under pressure, at least 7,000 BGF members resigned to protest the ouster of their top leaders. However, Saw refused to retire.

On 23 January 2024, Saw Chit Thu told the media that he discussed with Vice-Senior General Soe Win, the Deputy Commander-in-Chief, that the Border Guard Force (BGF), would no longer wish to accept money and supplies from the military. They aim to stand independently, and he also claimed that they don't want to fight against their fellow Karen people. On 6 March, the Karen BGF announced it would rename itself to the "Karen National Army" later in the month.

After splitting away from the Tatmadaw, the KNA acquires revenue via taxation of gambling and scam businesses in Shwe Kokko and KK Park. However, shortly after the split, the KNA reportedly rejoined junta forces during the Siege of Myawaddy in April 2024.

On 1 January 2026, the KNA officially completed its transition to an independent group, with some BGF units transferring out. KNA officers claim that they will not involve themselves in fighting for either side, and will only focus on internal affairs in Karen State. Following the transition, the Tatmadaw announced that all KNA forces must leave Myawaddy by 26 January, creating fears that clashes may erupt in the nearby town of Shwe Kokko. Shortly after, on 12 January, the junta launched airstrikes on the KNA camps at Oodaung and Thaiktaw, Hpa-An District, injuring 4 KNA soldiers.

== Assistance to the military regime during the Siege of Myawaddy ==
Multiple sources and analysts showed the KNA took control of Myawaddy after the junta's remaining troops from the 275th LIB retreated, and later facilitated the transfer of junta troops from their base to the 2nd Friendship Bridge. Jason Tower, the Myanmar director of the United States Institute of Peace, said KNA had been playing both sides and that it ultimately pivoted to assist the military regime, "leading to the photo op of the Myanmar flag once again being raised over the base".

== Alleged criminality and U.S. sanctions designation ==
In May 2025 the United States Department of the Treasury Office of Foreign Assets Control (OFAC) placed International Emergency Economic Powers Act sanctions on the KNA, Saw Chit Thu, and his two sons, Saw Htoo Eh Moo and Saw Chit Chit. They are designated on two OFAC lists: the Transnational Organized Crime list established under Executive Order 13581, as well the Executive Order 14014 list of individuals and groups "that threaten the peace, security, or stability of Burma."

The OFAC alleges that "the KNA profits from cyber scam schemes on an industrial scale by leasing land it controls to other organized crime groups, and providing support for human trafficking, smuggling, and the sale of utilities used to provide energy to scam operations". It further alleges that the KNA provides security for the KK Park "scam site".

On 8 September 2025, OFAC sanctioned 9 individuals and companies associated with the KNA for alleged involvement in supporting scam syndicates. Marco Rubio also labeled the KNA a transnational criminal organization.
