= Border Guard Forces =

Subdivisions of the Myanmar Armed Forces

- Shoulder sleeve insignia of the Border Guard Forces
- Founded: April 2009
- Country: Myanmar
- Branch: Myanmar Army
- Type: Border guard Light infantry
- Size: 8,000 (Karenic Kayin BGF); 4,000 (Karenic Kayan BGF); 5,000 (Karenic Pa-O BGF); 2,000 (Kachin KDA+NDA-K); 1,000 (Kokang BGF) = 20,000 (total)
- Part of: Tatmadaw
- Nickname: BGF

Commanders
- Minister of Defence: General Htun Aung
- Commander-in-Chief of Myanmar Armed Forces: Senior General Ye Win Oo
- Regional commanders: Several generals, including formerly Saw Chit Thu

Insignia
- Flag of Myanmar Border Guard Forces

Border Guard Forces (Burmese: နယ်ခြားစောင့်တပ်; abbreviated BGF) are subdivisions of the Tatmadaw (Myanmar Armed Forces) consisting of former insurgent groups in Myanmar under the instruction of Regional Military Commands. The government announced its plan to create Border Guard Forces in April 2009, in the hopes of ending hostilities between the government and insurgent groups leading up to the 2010 general election.

== History ==
In 2008 the new constitution made it mandatory for insurgent groups to transition into a BGF before the government would agree to engage in peace talks. Following the government announcement on BGFs, the government set a deadline for all insurgent groups to transition into BGFs, and that all ceasefire agreements prior to the deadline would become "null and void". The deadline was originally set to be June 2009, but was delayed five times until September 2010.

In April 2009, Lieutenant General Ye Myint led a government entourage to meet with Kokang, Shan and Wa insurgent groups, to discuss plans to create "collective security" formed by insurgent groups and under the command of the Tatmadaw, which would eventually lead to the creation of the Border Guard Forces. In 2009, four of the insurgent groups, the Democratic Karen Buddhist Army, the Kachin Defence Army (4th Brigade of the KIA), the New Democratic Army – Kachin (NDA-K) and the Pa-O National Organisation/Army (PNO/A), accepted the transition plan's terms and transformed into BGF groups.

On 20 August 2009, Tatmadaw soldiers and recently transitioned BGF groups gathered outside the town of Laukkai, Kokang, in preparation for an attempt to recapture the town from the Myanmar National Democratic Alliance Army (MNDAA), after they refused to transform into a BGF.

The government changed its aggressive stance towards BGFs and ceasefires on 18 August 2011, when then President of Myanmar Thein Sein pledged to "make the ethnic issue a national priority" by offering open dialogue between the government and all insurgent groups, without the BGF requirement.

=== Karen Border Guard Forces ===
In 2010, a powerful commander of DKBA Saw Chit Thu accepted the Burma government's demands to transform itself into the Border Guard Force, under the command of the Tatmadaw and serving as the leader.

=== Karen BGF Split ===
In January 2021, the Tatmadaw pressured Saw Chit Thu and other high-ranking officers, including Major Saw Mout Thon and Major Saw Tin Win, to resign from the BGF. Major Saw Mout Thon of BGF Battalion 1022 resigned on January 8, along with 13 commanders, 77 officers, and 13 battalions from 4 regiments who collectively signed and submitted their resignations. Amid controversy and under pressure, at least 7,000 BGF members resigned to protest the ouster of their top leaders. However, Saw refused to retire.

On 23 January 2024, Saw Chit Thu told the media that he discussed with Vice-Senior General Soe Win, the Deputy Commander-in-Chief, that the Border Guard Force (BGF), would no longer wish to accept money and supplies from the military. They aim to stand independently, and he also claimed that they don't want to fight against their fellow Karen people. On 6 March, the Karen BGF announced it would rename itself to the "Karen National Army" later in the month.

== Structure ==
There are no official government guidelines regarding BGFs, but there are lines in the Burmese constitution that reference them. The following are de facto rules set by the Tatmadaw upon creation of the Border Guard Forces:

- BGFs may only operate in the area they are assigned by the government
- All members of a BGF are to be paid the same salary as a regular soldier in the Tatmadaw
- Each battalion is to have exactly 326 personnel, 30 of whom are to be regular Tatmadaw soldiers
- Important administrative positions are to be held only by Tatmadaw soldiers

== List of Border Guard Forces ==
=== Current Border Guard Forces ===
All according to Asia Foundation

BGF #	Transformation Date	Township(s)	Previous Status	Notes
1007	30 March 2010	Mong Ton	Lahu Democratic Front	
1008	30 March 2010	Mong Yawng	Lahu Militia; Jakuni Militia	Combination of both Lahu and Jakuni militias
1009	18 May 2010	Tachileik	Lahu Militia	
1010	20 May 2010	Metman	Metman Militia	
1011–1023	18–21 August 2009	Kayin State	Democratic Karen Buddhist Army	Several elements of the Karen BGF have remained loyal to the Tatmadaw and continue to be active throughout Karen State

=== Former Border Guard Forces ===
BGF #	New Status	Transformation Date	Date of Change	Township(s)	Previous Status	Notes
1001	Captured and disarmed	8 November 2009	31 October 2024	Chipwi; Hsawlaw	New Democratic Army – Kachin	Formerly handled administration of Phimaw; Captured by Kachin Independence Army
1002	Captured and disarmed	8 November 2009	15 October 2024	Chipwi; Hsawlaw	New Democratic Army – Kachin	Formerly handled administration of Pang War; Captured by Kachin Independence Army
1003	Captured and disarmed	8 November 2009	20 November 2024	Waingmaw	New Democratic Army – Kachin	Formerly handled administration of Kanpaikti; Captured by Kachin Independence Army
1004	Karenni National People's Liberation Front	8 November 2009	13 June 2023	Hpasawng; Loikaw	Karenni National People's Liberation Front	Defected to anti-junta resistance in June 2023
1005	Karenni National People's Liberation Front	8 November 2009	13 June 2023	Bawlakhe; Mese	Karenni National People's Liberation Front	Defected to anti-junta resistance in June 2023
1006	Disarmed	9 December 2009	5 January 2024	Laukkai	Myanmar National Democratic Alliance Army (BGF-faction)	Originated out of a mutiny against the MNDAA after the 2009 Kokang incident; Formerly handled administration of Kokang; "Wiped out" and disarmed by MNDAA during the Battle of Laukkai
1011	Karen National Army	18 August 2009	January 2024	Hlaingbwe	Democratic Karen Buddhist Army	Karen BGF No. 1011–1023 began distancing themselves from the junta in January 2024, eventually defecting to form the Karen National Army
1012	Karen National Army	18 August 2009	January 2024	Hlaingbwe	Democratic Karen Buddhist Army	
1013	Karen National Army	18 August 2009	January 2024	Hpapun	Democratic Karen Buddhist Army	
1014	Karen National Army	18 August 2009	January 2024	Hpapun	Democratic Karen Buddhist Army	
1015	Karen National Army	20 August 2009	January 2024	Hlaingbwe	Democratic Karen Buddhist Army	
1016	Karen National Army	20 August 2009	January 2024	Hlaingbwe	Democratic Karen Buddhist Army	
1017	Karen National Army	20 August 2009	January 2024	Myawaddy	Democratic Karen Buddhist Army	
1018	Karen National Army	20 August 2009	January 2024	Myawaddy	Democratic Karen Buddhist Army	
1019	Karen National Army	20 August 2009	January 2024	Myawaddy	Democratic Karen Buddhist Army	
1020	Karen National Army	21 August 2009	January 2024	Myawaddy	Democratic Karen Buddhist Army	
1021	Karen National Army	21 August 2009	January 2024	Kawkareik	Democratic Karen Buddhist Army	
1022	Karen National Army	21 August 2009	January 2024	Kawkareik	Democratic Karen Buddhist Army	
1023	Karen National Army	21 August 2009	January 2024	Kyain Seikgyi	Karen Peace Force	

== Ranks ==
Rank group	General / flag officers	Senior officers			Junior officers
Border Guard Forces
Border Guard Forces		ဗိုလ်မှူးကြီး bohmu:gyi:	ဒုတိယ ဗိုလ်မှူးကြီး du.ti.ya. bohmu:gyi:	ဗိုလ်မှူး bohmu:	ဗိုလ်ကြီး bogyi:	ဗိုလ် bo	ဒုတိယ ဗိုလ် du.ti.ya. bo

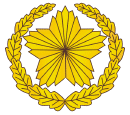
Rank group	Senior NCOs				Junior NCOs		Enlisted
Border Guard Forces							No insignia
Border Guard Forces	အရာခံဗိုလ် ăyaganbo	ဒုအရာခံဗိုလ် du.ăyaganbo	တပ်ခွဲတပ်ကြပ်ကြီး tathkwè:tatkyatkyi:	တပ်ကြပ်ကြီး tatkyatkyi:	တပ်ကြပ် tatkyat	ဒုတပ်ကြပ် du.tatkyatkyi:	တပ်သား tattha:
