= Languages of Myanmar =

Languages of Myanmar (Burma)
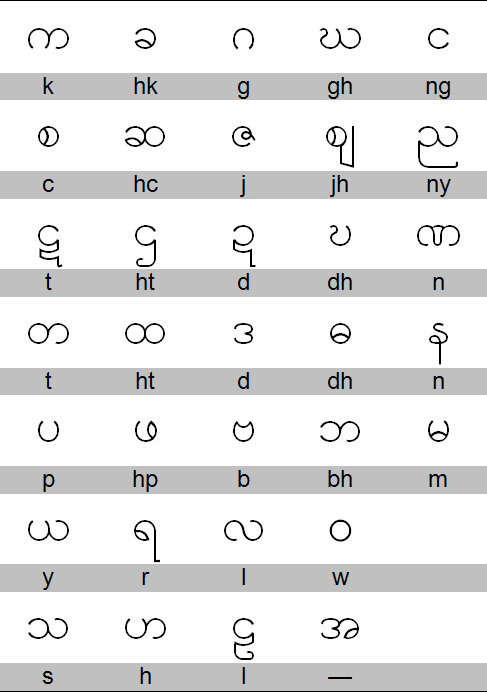
- Burmese letters in order
- Official: Myanmar
- Regional: Shan, Karen, Kachin, Rakhine, Mon, Karenni, Chin, Kokang
- Vernacular: Myanmar English
- Minority: Many Sino-Tibetan, Tai–Kadai, Austroasiatic and Indo-Aryan languages
- Foreign: English, Mandarin Chinese
- Signed: Burmese sign language
- Keyboard layout: QWERTY/Burmese layout

A map of languages used in Burma

There are approximately a hundred languages spoken in Myanmar (also known as Burma). Burmese, spoken by two-thirds of the population, is the official language.

Languages spoken by ethnic minorities represent six language families: Sino-Tibetan, Austro-Asiatic, Tai–Kadai, Indo-European, Austronesian and Hmong–Mien, as well as an incipient national standard for Burmese sign language.

== Burmese ==
A Burmese speaker, recorded in Taiwan.

Burmese is the native language of the Bamar people and related sub-ethnic groups of the Bamar, as well as that of some ethnic minorities in Burma like the Mon. In 2007, Burmese was spoken by 33 million people as a first language. Burmese is spoken as a second language by another 10 million people, particularly ethnic minorities in Burma and those in neighbouring countries.

Burmese is a Sino-Tibetan language belonging to the Southern Burmish branch of the Tibeto-Burman languages. Burmese is the most widely spoken of the Tibeto-Burman languages and among the Sino-Tibetan languages, the second most widely spoken, after the Sinitic languages. Burmese was the fourth of the Sino-Tibetan languages to develop a writing system, after Chinese, Tibetan, and Tangut. There are various Burmese dialects or related languages, the largest being Arakanese (or Rakhine), which retains the /r/ sound of older forms of Burmese, as well as various differences in vowel pronunciations. Some anglicisation of Burmese words was made with Rakhine pronunciations such as Irrawaddy for the Ayeyarwady River. Other prominent Burmese dialects or languages include the Intha language and the Tavoyan dialects in Dawei. The following at typically considered languages:

- Burmese
- Arakanese
- Intha

As far as natural language processing research dealing with interaction of computers and Burmese human-spoken language is concerned, during the period spanning more than 25 years, from 1990 to 2016, notable work has been done and annotated in the areas of Burmese language word identification, segmentation, disambiguation, collation, semantic parsing and tokenization followed by part-of-speech tagging, machine translation systems, text keying/input, text recognition and text display methods. The scope for further research too has been explored for areas of parallel corpus development as well as development of search engines and WordNet for the Burmese language.

== Non-Burmese languages ==
Aside from Burmese and its dialects, the hundred or so languages of Myanmar include Shan (Tai, spoken by 3.2 million), Karen languages (spoken by 2.6 million), Kachin (spoken by 900,000), Tamil (spoken by 1.1 Million), various Chin languages (spoken by 780,000), and Mon (Mon–Khmer, spoken by 750,000). Most of these languages use the Burmese script.

In formal environments of central Burma, usage of its minority languages is often discouraged or less emphasised.

It is not clear if there are one or two Burmese sign languages.

=== Sino-Tibetan ===
==== Lolo-Burmese ====
There are various Sino-Tibetan languages outside of the South Burmish branch. A few minorities in northern Shan State and Kachin State speak languages of the North Burmish branch of the Burmish languages, namely:

- Lhao Vo
- Zaiwa
- Lashi (or Lacit)
- Achang (or Maingtha)

Of the Loloish languages, Myanmar has four groups primarily in Shan State, with the Lisu also living in Kachin State. These four languages use the Roman alphabet through spelling introduced by Christian missionaries in the twentieth century. The four languages are:

- Akha (or Kaw)
- Lahu
- Pyen
- Lisu

Other Loloish languages include the Nusu

==== Chin languages ====
The greatest linguistic diversity, however, is in Chin State, where even the term "Chin" is a Burmese name given to fifty-three named groups with shared similarities. Most, but not all, belong to the Kuki-Chin language family. Many Chin languages are described by place names, such as Tedim, Hakha and Falam.

- Languages in Chin State
  - Anu-Hkongso
  - Shö
  - Bawm
  - Daai
  - Khumi
  - Falam
  - Hakha Chin
  - Kaang
  - Laitu
  - Lautu
  - Mara
  - Matu
  - Mizo
  - Mün
  - Ngawn
  - Welaung
  - Rungtu
  - Senthang
  - Sizang
  - Songlai
  - Sumtu
  - Tawr
  - Tedim
  - Thadou
  - Thaiphum
  - Zotung
  - Zyphe

==== Other Sino-Tibetan ====
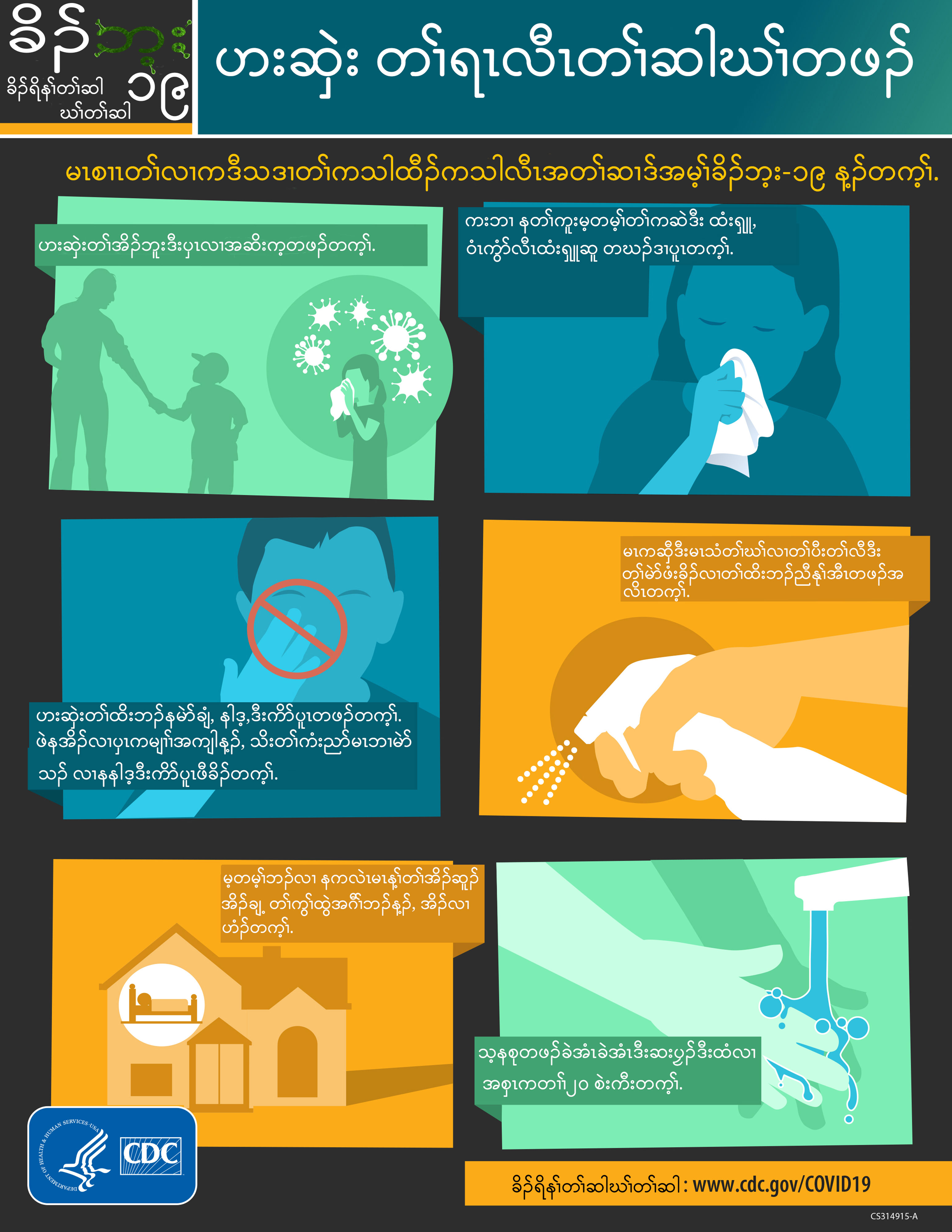
A COVID-19 poster in Sgaw Karen script

Beyond the Chin, there are a variety of other Sino-Tibetan languages outside of the Lolo-Burmese branch the most prominent being the Karenic languages with twenty languages shared between twenty-one distinct Karen and Karenni groups. The primary languages are within these are:

- Sgaw Karen
- Karenni (or Kayah)
- Eastern Pwo
- Western Pwo (or Pho Karen)
- Pa'o

These five languages tend to have their own scripts, based on the Mon-Burmese script, but are typically written with the Roman alphabet. A few other languages like the Lahta language who lack traditional writing use Karenic scripts. Pa'o does not have its own script.

In the north, the Jingpho language (or Kachin language) is the main language of a larger Kachin language group, mostly in the Jingpho-Luish branch of Sino-Tibetan including:

- Kadu
- Ganan
- Sak (or Atsa)

This group also includes the extinct Taman language.

The Mruic languages in western Myanmar make another small group of Sino-Tibetan languages with the following:

- Mru
- Anu-Hkongso (in Chin State)

In the Northwest there are a couple Naga languages and Konyak languages including:

- Anal
- Khiamniungan
- Konyak
- Long Phuri
- Tangsa

In far northern Kachin, there are three distinct Sino-Tibetan languages from various branches:

- Rawang
- Nung
- Taraon (unrecognised by Myanmar)
- Khams Tibetan

From the Sinitic branch, Mandarin Chinese also has a presence both from Chinese people in Myanmar and from the Kokang ethnic group in northeastern Myanmar, who speak a Yunnanese variety of Mandarin.

- Other Sino-Tibetan languages
  - Akeu
  - Akyaung Ari
  - Derung
  - Hpon
  - Kayaw
  - Koki
  - Geko Karen
  - Leinong
  - Makury
  - Mro
  - Padaung
  - Para
  - Ponyo
  - Riang
  - Tangkhul
  - Zou

=== Austroasiatic ===
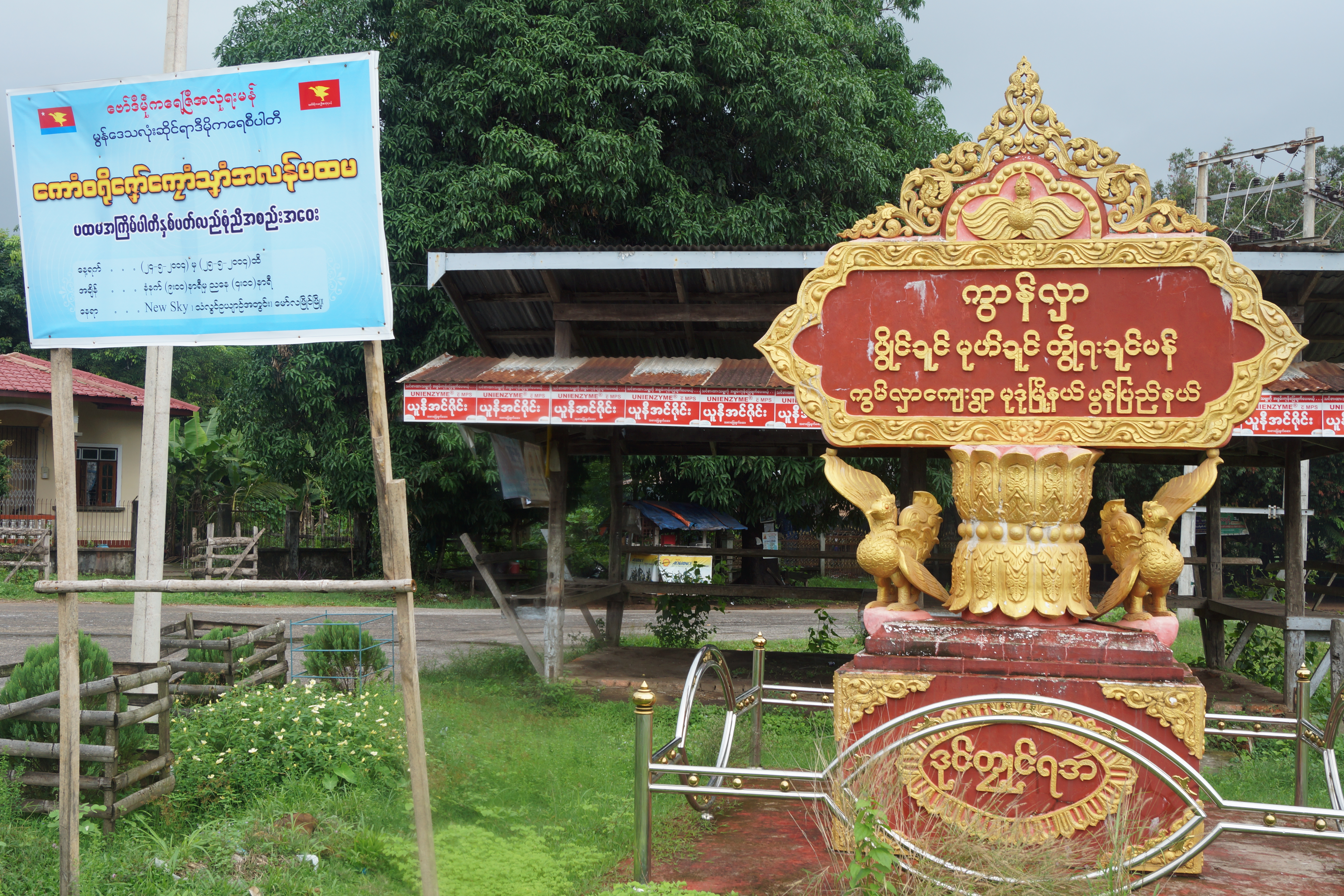
Mon language signs in Mawlamyine

Historically, the most important Austroasiatic language is the Mon language of the lower delta region, which is now diminishing in usage. Most remaining Austroasiatic languages today are in Shan State from the Palaungic branch.

- Blang
- Danau
- Muak Sa-aak
- Mon
- Palaung
- Riang
- Tai Loi
- Wa

=== Kra-Dai ===
There are seven distinct languages recognised but, many Kra–Dai languages in Myanmar are collectively known as the Shan language and consist of a dialect continuum with many similarities to official Thai spoken in Thailand.

- Khamti
- Khün
- Tai Lue
- Tai Laing
- Tai Mao
- Tai Nuea
- Tai Yai (or Shan)

=== Austronesian ===
The only native Austronesian language is Saloun, known in Burmese as Moken, which is similar but distinct from the Moklen language spoken in southern Thailand.

=== Hmong-Mien ===
- Hmong

=== Indo-Aryan and Dravidian ===
Indo-Aryan languages exist natively on the northern border of Rakhine State reflecting the shifting borders between various South Asian states and Myanmar throughout history. In addition, various Indian groups migrated to Myanmar during British rule in Burma, bring both Indo-Aryan and Dravidian languages

- Indo-Aryan
  - Nepali (Burmese Gurkha)
  - Daingnet (or Chakma)
  - Rohingya
  - Bengali
  - Tanchangya
- Dravidian
  - Tamil
  - Telugu

== English as a second language ==
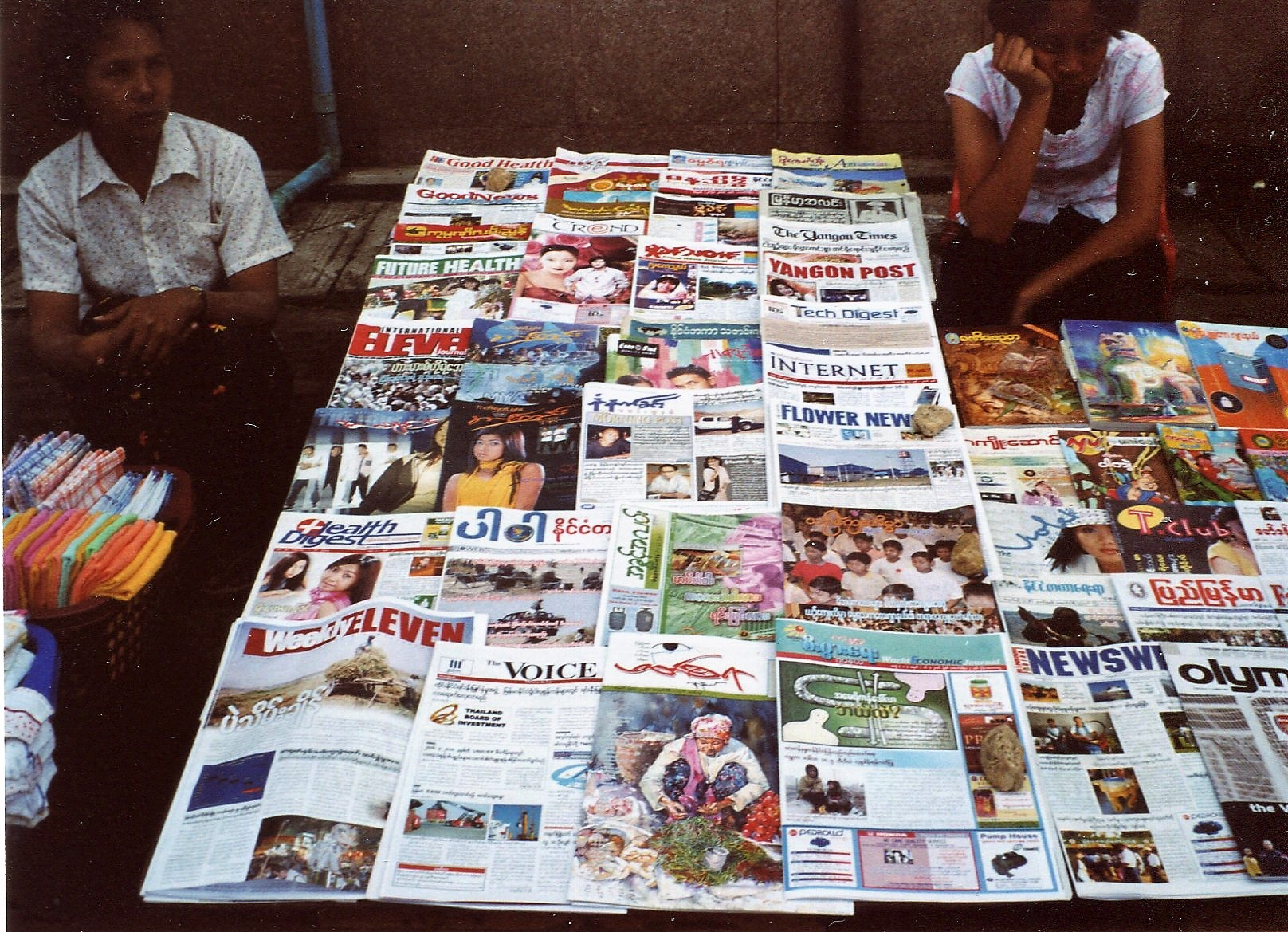
Newspapers in the streets of Yangon including publications also in English, 2006

Today, Burmese is the primary language of instruction with English being taught as a secondary language. English was the primary language of instruction in higher education from late 19th century to 1964, when Gen. Ne Win mandated educational reforms to "Burmanise". English continues to be used by educated urbanites and the national government.

== See also ==
- Burmese English

== Bibliography ==
- Goddard, Cliff (2005), The Languages Of East And Southeast Asia: An Introduction, Oxford University Press, ISBN 0-19-924860-5
- Bradley, David (2020). "Languages". In Simpson, Adam; Farrelly, Nicholas; Holliday, Ian (eds.). Routledge Handbook of Contemporary Myanmar. Routledge. pp. 117–125. ISBN 9781138820777.
- Lintner, Bertil (2003), "Myanmar/Burma", in MacKerras, Colin (ed.), Ethnicity in Asia, Routledge, ISBN 0-415-25816-2
- Thein, Myat (2004), Economic Development of Myanmar, Institute of Southeast Asian Studies, ISBN 981-230-211-5
