= Tadahiko Shintani =

Japanese linguist

- Born: October 9, 1946 (age 79); Ishikawa Prefecture, Japan
- Other name: 新谷 忠彦
- Occupation: linguist

Tadahiko Shintani (Japanese: 新谷 忠彦, romanized: Shintani Tadahiko, born October 1946) is a Japanese linguist and Professor Emeritus of the Tokyo University of Foreign Studies, specializing in the phonology of New Caledonian languages and Southeast Asian languages.

== Biography ==
Shintani is from Ishikawa Prefecture. He graduated from Department of French Studies at Sophia University in 1970, and completed his studies at the Ecole Pratique des Hautes Etudes in 1974. In 1977 he was appointed assistant professor at the Institute of Languages and Cultures of Asia and Africa at the Tokyo University of Foreign Studies, and was promoted to associate professor in 1987 and full professor in 1995. He retired in 2011.

In the 1990s, he led a group of Japanese linguists researching the languages of northern Laos. He is a prominent advocate of the concept of a Tai Cultural Area, which he uses to refer to the area of continental Southeast Asia―including Yunnan and Guangxi in China and Assam in India―that is inhabited by ethnic groups that speak Tai languages.

Shintani has also recorded word lists of dozens of lesser-known Karenic languages.

== Selected works ==
- Linguistic research and Shan culture area, and Chicken, Poultry Resources Study Group Report No. 4 pp. 25–29 Poultry Resources Study Group · Tokyo 2005.6.14
- Austroasiatic tone languages of the Tai Cultural Area - aroma of typhal studies of Tonal Phenomena, Shigeki Kaji ed. pp. 271 – 292 Asia-Africa Institute for Language and Culture 2005.12.14
- Linguistic Survey of Phongxaly, Lao P.D.R. (co-edited) Tokyo University of Foreign Studies Asia-Africa Institute for Language and Culture, 234, 2001
- Shan (Tay) phonology theory and character method, (co-authored) Tokyo University of Foreign Studies Asia-Africa Institute for Language and Culture, 112, 2000
- Miao-Yao from the viewpoint of language, Asian studies, No. 9, 149 - 157, 1999
- Linguistic & Anthropologologist Study on the Shan Culture Area (edited) Tokyo University of Foreign Studies Asia-Africa Institute for Language and Culture, 246, 1999
- Basic Vocabularies of the Languages Spoken in Phongxaly, Lao P.D.R. (co-edited) Tokyo University of Foreign Studies Language and Culture Research Institute for Asia and Africa, 359, 1999
- Golden square area - History, language and ethnicity of Shan culture area, (edited) Keigo Shosha, 326, 1998
- Deux Textes en Langue de Gonen (Nouvelle - Caledonie) "Asia-Africa Language and Culture Studies" 46 · 47, 362 - 374, 1994

=== LSTCA series ===
The Linguistic survey of Tay cultural area (LSTCA) series of vocabularies by Tadahiko Shintani is published by the Research Institute for Languages and Cultures of Asia and Africa (ILCAA).

- no. 101. The Riang language. 2008
- no. 102. The Zayein language. 2014
- no. 103. The Wadamkhong language. 2014
- no. 104. The Shanke language. 2015 (Note: Note: Shanke is a Northern Naga language.)
- no. 105. The Zotung language. 2015
- no. 106. The Kadaw language. 2015
- no. 107. The Siam (Hsem) language. 2016
- no. 108. The Va (En) language. 2016
- no. 109. The Nangki language. 2016
- no. 110. The Matu language. 2016
- no. 111. The Gokhu language. 2017
- no. 112. The Blimaw language. 2017
- no. 113. The Khwingsang language. 2018
- no. 114. The Khrangkhu language. 2018
- no. 115. The Yingtalay language. 2018
- no. 116. The Thaidai language. 2018
- no. 117. The Makuri language. 2018
- no. 118. The Sonkan Kayan language. 2018
- no. 119. The Kokak language. 2018
- no. 120. The Dosanbu Kayan language. 2018
- no. 121. The Sen Tsum (I-Mok) language. 2019
- no. 122. The Phulon Kayan language. 2019
- no. 123. The Lagu Kayan language. 2019
- no. 124. The Totan Kayan language. 2019
- no. 125. The Dokhoncon Kayan language. 2019
- no. 126. The Thamidai language. 2020
- no. 127. The Kanaw (Danaw) language. 2020
- no. 128. The Nantwei Kayan language. 2020
- no. 129. The Pimon Kayan language. 2020
- no. 130. The Sonplao Kayan language. 2020
- no. 131. The Pao language: its Taunggyi and Kokareit dialects. 2020
- no. 132. The Dolan Kayan language. 2021
- no. 133. The Thaoku Kayan language. 2021
- no. 134. The Diklon Kayan language. 2021
- no. 135. The Pulon Kayan language. 2021
- no. 136. The Kabla Kayan language. 2021
- no. 137. The Kathan Kayan language. 2021
- no. 138. The Kalondei Kayan language. 2021
- no. 139. The Ramaku Kayan language. 2022
- no. 140. The Kayin Phyu language. 2022
- no. 141. The Subao Kayan language. 2022
- no. 142. The Kadu Kayan language. 2022
- no. 143. The Huason Kayan language. 2022
- no. 144. The Hanti Kayan language. 2022
- no. 145. The Sonpu Kayan language. 2022
- no. 146. The Agu language. 2023
- no. 147. The Dingra language. 2023
- no. 148. The Lungmi language. 2024
- no. 149. The Daru language. 2024
- A handbook of comparative Kayan languages. 2020
