= Demographics of Myanmar =

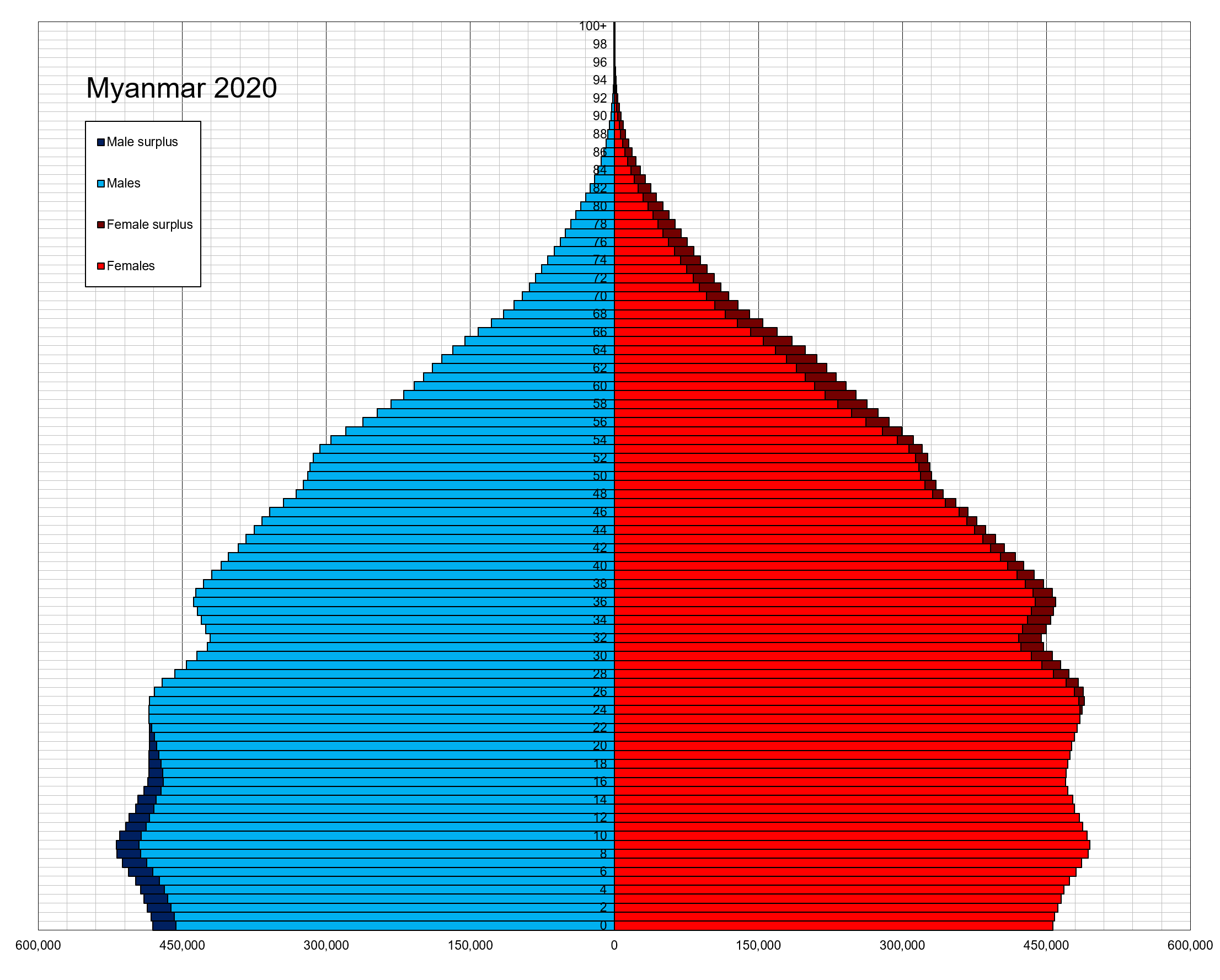
- Population pyramid of Myanmar in 2020
- Population: 51,319,000 (2024, Myanmar Department of population)
- Growth rate: 0.78% (2022 est.)
- Birth rate: 16.34 births/1,000 population
- Death rate: 8.75 deaths/1,000 population
- Life expectancy: 69.92 years
  - male: 68.27 years
  - female: 71.67 years
- Fertility rate: 2.02 children
- Infant mortality: 32.94 deaths/1,000 live births
- Net migration rate: -1.37 migrant(s)/1,000 population

Age structure
- 0–14 years: 26.93%
- 15–64 years: 66.49%
- 65 and over: 6.58%

Sex ratio
- Total: 0.97 male(s)/female (2022 est.)
- At birth: 1.06 male(s)/female

Nationality
- Nationality: Burmese
- Major ethnic: Burman (Bamar) (68%)

This is a demography of Myanmar (also known as Burma) including statistics such as population, ethnicity, language, education level, and religious affiliations.

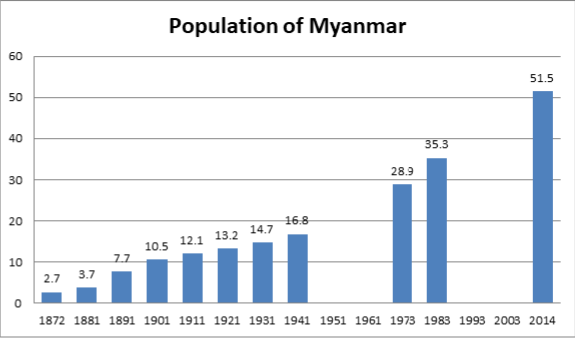
Population of Myanmar by census

== Population size and structure ==
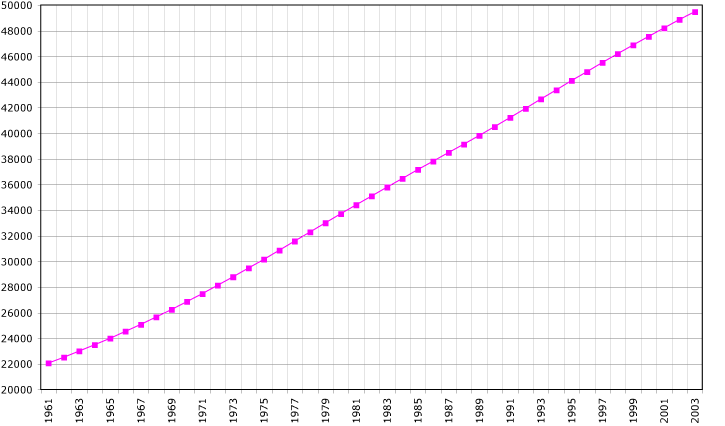
Demographics of Myanmar, Data of FAO, year 2009; Number of inhabitants in thousands.

=== 1983 census ===
The 1983 census in Burma reported a population of 35,442,972. As of July 2012, this was estimated by the CIA World Factbook to have increased to 60,584,650. Other estimates put place the total population at around 60 million. China's People's Daily reported that Burma had a census in 2007, and at the end of 2009 has 59.2 million people, and growing at 2% annually. with exception for Cyclone Nargis in 2008. Most of these estimates have indeed overlooked the demographic changes that were at work since the 1970s in the country.

Britain-based human rights agencies place the population as high as 70 million. Estimates for the country explicitly take into account the effects of excess mortality due to AIDS. This can result in lower life expectancy, higher infant mortality and death rates, lower population and growth rates, and changes in the distribution of population by age and sex than would otherwise be expected.

No trustworthy census has occurred since the 1930s. In the 1940s, the detailed census results were destroyed during the Japanese invasion of 1942. Census results after that time have been flawed by civil wars and a series of military governments. The census in 1983 occurred at a time when parts of the country were controlled by insurgent groups and inaccessible to the government.

=== 2014 census ===
The Provisional results of the 2014 census show that the total population of Myanmar is 51,419,420—a population well below the official estimates of more than 60 million. This total population includes 50,213,067 persons counted during the census and an estimated 1,206,353 persons in parts of northern Rakhine State, Kachin State and Kayin State who were not counted. More females (51.8%) were counted than males (48.2%). People who were out of the country at the time of the census are not included in these figures.

The provisional census results indicated that there were 10,889,348 households in Myanmar. On average, 4.4 people lived in each household in the country. The average household size was highest in Kachin State and Chin State at 5.1. The lowest household sizes were observed in Ayeyawady Region, Bago Region, Magway Region and Naypyidaw Union Territory, each at 4.1.

=== Structure of the population ===
Population Estimates by Sex and Age Group (01.X.2012) (Estimates):

| Age group | Male | Female | Total | % |
|---|---|---|---|---|
| Total | 30 139 447 | 30 836 546 | 60 975 993 | 100 |
| 0-4 | 2 892 346 | 2 843 804 | 5 736 150 | 9.41 |
| 5-9 | 3 019 538 | 2 933 751 | 5 953 054 | 9.76 |
| 10-14 | 3 061 725 | 2 939 751 | 6 001 476 | 9.84 |
| 15-19 | 2 939 176 | 2 830 830 | 5 770 006 | 9.46 |
| 20-24 | 2 804 028 | 2 729 466 | 5 533 494 | 9.07 |
| 25-29 | 2 608 652 | 2 578 175 | 5 186 827 | 8.51 |
| 30-34 | 2 378 395 | 2 414 221 | 4 792 616 | 7.86 |
| 35-39 | 2 134 820 | 2 212 315 | 4 347 135 | 7.13 |
| 40-44 | 1 868 709 | 1 984 907 | 3 853 616 | 6.32 |
| 45-49 | 1 604 910 | 1 737 570 | 3 342 480 | 5.48 |
| 50-54 | 1 325 584 | 1 459 978 | 2 785 562 | 4.57 |
| 55-59 | 1 081 479 | 1 213 529 | 2 295 008 | 3.76 |
| 60-64 | 838 871 | 962 728 | 1 801 599 | 2.95 |
| 65-69 | 647 286 | 766 066 | 1 413 352 | 2.32 |
| 70-74 | 477 948 | 593 666 | 1 071 614 | 1.76 |
| 75-79 | 335 405 | 449 974 | 785 379 | 1.29 |
| 80+ | 120 575 | 186 050 | 306 625 | 0.50 |
| Age group | Male | Female | Total | Percent |
| 0-14 | 8 973 609 | 8 717 306 | 17 690 915 | 29.01 |
| 15-64 | 19 584 624 | 20 123 484 | 39 708 108 | 65.12 |
| 65+ | 1 581 214 | 1 995 756 | 3 576 970 | 5.87 |

Population by Sex and Age Group (Census 29.III.2014) (Data refer to enumerated population. - 50 279 900); Population - 51 486 253:

| Age group | Male | Female | Total | % |
|---|---|---|---|---|
| Total | 24 228 714 | 26 051 186 | 50 279 900 | 100 |
| 0-4 | 2 262 783 | 2 209 347 | 4 472 130 | 8.89 |
| 5-9 | 2 438 372 | 2 380 705 | 4 819 077 | 9.58 |
| 10-14 | 2 595 759 | 2 512 613 | 5 108 362 | 10.16 |
| 15-19 | 2 290 998 | 2 334 991 | 4 625 989 | 9.20 |
| 20-24 | 2 091 525 | 2 239 544 | 4 331 069 | 8.61 |
| 25-29 | 1 995 465 | 2 150 669 | 4 146 134 | 8.25 |
| 30-34 | 1 884 549 | 2 014 312 | 3 898 861 | 7.75 |
| 35-39 | 1 705 630 | 1 857 850 | 3 563 480 | 7.09 |
| 40-44 | 1 548 942 | 1 734 131 | 3 283 073 | 6.53 |
| 45-49 | 1 375 041 | 1 571 107 | 2 946 148 | 5.86 |
| 50-54 | 1 182 341 | 1 376 891 | 2 559 232 | 5.09 |
| 55-59 | 935 979 | 1 115 958 | 2 051 937 | 4.08 |
| 60-64 | 712 040 | 864 805 | 1 576 845 | 3.14 |
| 65-69 | 466 618 | 597 875 | 1 064 493 | 2.12 |
| 70-74 | 301 679 | 411 491 | 713 170 | 1.42 |
| 75-79 | 228 315 | 324 983 | 553 298 | 1.10 |
| 80-84 | 130 875 | 204 701 | 335 576 | 0.67 |
| 85-89 | 56 979 | 101 090 | 158 069 | 0.31 |
| 90+ | 24 834 | 48 123 | 72 957 | 0.15 |
| Age group | Male | Female | Total | Percent |
| 0-14 | 7 296 904 | 7 102 665 | 14 399 569 | 28.64 |
| 15-64 | 15 722 510 | 17 260 258 | 32 982 768 | 65.60 |
| 65+ | 1 209 300 | 1 688 263 | 2 897 563 | 5.76 |

Population Estimates by Sex and Age Group (01.X.2020) (Based on the results of the 2014 Population Census.):

| Age group | Male | Female | Total | % |
|---|---|---|---|---|
| Total | 26 253 029 | 28 564 888 | 54 817 917 | 100 |
| 0–4 | 2 530 919 | 2 466 636 | 4 997 555 | 9.12 |
| 5–9 | 2 440 079 | 2 391 031 | 4 831 110 | 8.81 |
| 10–14 | 2 498 690 | 2 434 982 | 4 933 672 | 9.00 |
| 15–19 | 2 580 205 | 2 502 427 | 5 082 632 | 9.27 |
| 20–24 | 2 303 893 | 2 352 534 | 4 656 427 | 8.49 |
| 25–29 | 2 048 287 | 2 234 735 | 4 283 022 | 7.81 |
| 30–34 | 1 933 997 | 2 157 191 | 4 091 188 | 7.46 |
| 35–39 | 1 848 391 | 2 048 816 | 3 897 207 | 7.11 |
| 40–44 | 1 686 627 | 1 892 346 | 3 578 973 | 6.53 |
| 45–49 | 1 524 718 | 1 764 361 | 3 289 079 | 6.00 |
| 50–54 | 1 352 184 | 1 607 900 | 2 960 084 | 5.40 |
| 55–59 | 1 155 216 | 1 413 151 | 2 568 367 | 4.69 |
| 60–64 | 896 135 | 1 145 018 | 2 041 153 | 3.72 |
| 65-69 | 640 767 | 863 956 | 1 504 723 | 2.74 |
| 70-74 | 395 453 | 576 158 | 971 611 | 1.77 |
| 75-79 | 211 626 | 342 884 | 554 510 | 1.01 |
| 80-84 | 124 414 | 213 715 | 338 129 | 0.62 |
| 85-89 | 61 122 | 113 105 | 174 227 | 0.32 |
| 90+ | 20 306 | 43 942 | 64 248 | 0.12 |
| Age group | Male | Female | Total | Percent |
| 0–14 | 7 469 688 | 7 292 649 | 14 762 337 | 26.93 |
| 15–64 | 17 329 653 | 19 118 479 | 36 448 132 | 66.49 |
| 65+ | 1 453 688 | 2 153 760 | 3 607 448 | 6.58 |

== Vital statistics ==
Burma has a low fertility rate (2.23 in 2011), slightly above replacement level, especially as compared to other Southeast Asian countries of similar economic standing, like Cambodia (3.18) and Laos (4.41), representing a significant decline from 4.7 in 1983 to 2.4 in 2001, despite the absence of any national population policy.

The fertility rate is much pronouncedly lower in urban areas. This is attributed to extreme delays in marriage (almost unparalleled in the region, with the exception of developed countries), the prevalence of illegal abortions, and the high proportion of single, unmarried women of reproductive age (with 25.9% of women aged 30–34 and 33.1% of men and women aged 25–34 single).

These patterns stem from several cultural and economic dynamics. The first is economic hardship, which results in the delay of marriage and family-building (the average age of marriage in Burma is 27.5 for men, 26.4 for women). The second is the social acceptability of celibacy among the Burmese, who are predominantly Buddhist and value celibacy as a means of spiritual development.

View source data.
View source data.
View source data.

=== UN estimates ===
| Year | Live births per year | Deaths per year | Natural change per year | CBR^{1} | CDR^{1} | NC^{1} | TFR^{1} | IMR^{1} |
|---|---|---|---|---|---|---|---|---|
| 1950 | 808,000 | 496,000 | 312,000 | 45.6 | 28.0 | 17.6 | 5.95 | 213.7 |
| 1951 | 820,000 | 499,000 | 321,000 | 45.4 | 27.6 | 17.8 | 5.95 | 209.8 |
| 1952 | 832,000 | 485,000 | 347,000 | 45.2 | 26.4 | 18.9 | 5.95 | 201.1 |
| 1953 | 845,000 | 478,000 | 367,000 | 45.1 | 25.5 | 19.6 | 5.96 | 193.6 |
| 1954 | 858,000 | 469,000 | 389,000 | 44.8 | 24.5 | 20.3 | 5.97 | 186.7 |
| 1955 | 868,000 | 463,000 | 404,000 | 44.5 | 23.7 | 20.7 | 5.97 | 180.6 |
| 1956 | 879,000 | 458,000 | 421,000 | 44.1 | 23.0 | 21.1 | 5.98 | 175.2 |
| 1957 | 891,000 | 456,000 | 435,000 | 43.8 | 22.4 | 21.4 | 5.99 | 170.5 |
| 1958 | 900,000 | 452,000 | 447,000 | 43.3 | 21.7 | 21.5 | 5.99 | 166.4 |
| 1959 | 908,000 | 451,000 | 457,000 | 42.7 | 21.2 | 21.5 | 5.99 | 162.8 |
| 1960 | 917,000 | 449,000 | 467,000 | 42.2 | 20.7 | 21.5 | 5.98 | 159.3 |
| 1961 | 926,000 | 449,000 | 477,000 | 41.7 | 20.2 | 21.5 | 5.98 | 155.7 |
| 1962 | 938,000 | 447,000 | 491,000 | 41.3 | 19.7 | 21.6 | 5.99 | 151.7 |
| 1963 | 948,000 | 445,000 | 503,000 | 40.9 | 19.2 | 21.7 | 5.99 | 147.4 |
| 1964 | 960,000 | 439,000 | 521,000 | 40.4 | 18.5 | 22.0 | 5.99 | 142.3 |
| 1965 | 974,000 | 431,000 | 543,000 | 40.1 | 17.8 | 22.3 | 5.99 | 136.9 |
| 1966 | 983,000 | 425,000 | 559,000 | 39.6 | 17.1 | 22.5 | 5.96 | 131.3 |
| 1967 | 996,000 | 418,000 | 578,000 | 39.1 | 16.4 | 22.7 | 5.92 | 126.2 |
| 1968 | 1,007,000 | 413,000 | 594,000 | 38.7 | 15.9 | 22.8 | 5.87 | 121.8 |
| 1969 | 1,019,000 | 417,000 | 601,000 | 38.2 | 15.7 | 22.6 | 5.81 | 119.6 |
| 1970 | 1,032,000 | 420,000 | 612,000 | 37.8 | 15.4 | 22.4 | 5.75 | 117.8 |
| 1971 | 1,046,000 | 420,000 | 625,000 | 37.5 | 15.1 | 22.4 | 5.68 | 115.9 |
| 1972 | 1,056,000 | 424,000 | 632,000 | 37.0 | 14.9 | 22.1 | 5.59 | 113.8 |
| 1973 | 1,066,000 | 426,000 | 640,000 | 36.5 | 14.6 | 21.9 | 5.49 | 111.8 |
| 1974 | 1,069,000 | 427,000 | 643,000 | 35.9 | 14.3 | 21.6 | 5.38 | 109.7 |
| 1975 | 1,078,000 | 429,000 | 649,000 | 35.5 | 14.1 | 21.4 | 5.29 | 107.8 |
| 1976 | 1,088,000 | 428,000 | 659,000 | 35.1 | 13.8 | 21.3 | 5.21 | 105.7 |
| 1977 | 1,096,000 | 430,000 | 666,000 | 34.7 | 13.6 | 21.1 | 5.12 | 103.7 |
| 1978 | 1,105,000 | 435,000 | 670,000 | 34.3 | 13.5 | 20.8 | 5.02 | 102.0 |
| 1979 | 1,117,000 | 434,000 | 683,000 | 34.0 | 13.2 | 20.8 | 4.94 | 99.9 |
| 1980 | 1,122,000 | 434,000 | 687,000 | 33.5 | 13.0 | 20.5 | 4.83 | 98.0 |
| 1981 | 1,129,000 | 437,000 | 692,000 | 33.1 | 12.8 | 20.3 | 4.73 | 96.2 |
| 1982 | 1,145,000 | 439,000 | 706,000 | 32.9 | 12.6 | 20.3 | 4.67 | 94.5 |
| 1983 | 1,162,000 | 443,000 | 719,000 | 32.8 | 12.5 | 20.3 | 4.62 | 92.8 |
| 1984 | 1,169,000 | 447,000 | 722,000 | 32.3 | 12.4 | 20.0 | 4.50 | 91.3 |
| 1985 | 1,153,000 | 450,000 | 702,000 | 31.3 | 12.2 | 19.1 | 4.30 | 89.9 |
| 1986 | 1,133,000 | 452,000 | 681,000 | 30.2 | 12.0 | 18.1 | 4.09 | 88.4 |
| 1987 | 1,112,000 | 453,000 | 659,000 | 29.1 | 11.8 | 17.2 | 3.89 | 87.0 |
| 1988 | 1,094,000 | 459,000 | 636,000 | 28.1 | 11.8 | 16.4 | 3.71 | 85.5 |
| 1989 | 1,102,000 | 455,000 | 646,000 | 27.9 | 11.5 | 16.4 | 3.64 | 83.9 |
| 1990 | 1,102,000 | 461,000 | 641,000 | 27.5 | 11.5 | 16.0 | 3.54 | 82.3 |
| 1991 | 1,101,000 | 461,000 | 640,000 | 27.0 | 11.3 | 15.7 | 3.45 | 80.8 |
| 1992 | 1,096,000 | 462,000 | 634,000 | 26.6 | 11.2 | 15.4 | 3.36 | 79.1 |
| 1993 | 1,092,000 | 461,000 | 631,000 | 26.1 | 11.0 | 15.1 | 3.28 | 77.3 |
| 1994 | 1,082,000 | 461,000 | 621,000 | 25.5 | 10.9 | 14.7 | 3.19 | 75.6 |
| 1995 | 1,072,000 | 461,000 | 611,000 | 25.0 | 10.7 | 14.2 | 3.11 | 74.0 |
| 1996 | 1,068,000 | 452,000 | 616,000 | 24.6 | 10.4 | 14.2 | 3.04 | 72.2 |
| 1997 | 1,059,000 | 453,000 | 606,000 | 24.1 | 10.3 | 13.8 | 2.96 | 70.6 |
| 1998 | 1,051,000 | 448,000 | 603,000 | 23.6 | 10.1 | 13.5 | 2.89 | 69.0 |
| 1999 | 1,046,000 | 454,000 | 592,000 | 23.2 | 10.1 | 13.1 | 2.83 | 67.4 |
| 2000 | 1,046,000 | 456,000 | 590,000 | 22.9 | 10.0 | 12.9 | 2.79 | 65.9 |
| 2001 | 1,059,000 | 458,000 | 601,000 | 23.0 | 9.9 | 13.0 | 2.78 | 64.3 |
| 2002 | 1,071,000 | 460,000 | 612,000 | 23.0 | 9.9 | 13.1 | 2.78 | 62.8 |
| 2003 | 1,054,000 | 461,000 | 593,000 | 22.4 | 9.8 | 12.6 | 2.70 | 61.1 |
| 2004 | 1,033,000 | 462,000 | 571,000 | 21.8 | 9.7 | 12.0 | 2.62 | 59.5 |
| 2005 | 1,016,000 | 460,000 | 556,000 | 21.3 | 9.6 | 11.6 | 2.55 | 57.8 |
| 2006 | 1,004,000 | 461,000 | 543,000 | 20.8 | 9.6 | 11.3 | 2.50 | 56.0 |
| 2007 | 1,000,000 | 457,000 | 543,000 | 20.6 | 9.4 | 11.2 | 2.48 | 54.2 |
| 2008 | 984,000 | 593,000 | 391,000 | 20.2 | 12.1 | 8.0 | 2.43 | 62.8 |
| 2009 | 973,000 | 451,000 | 521,000 | 19.8 | 9.2 | 10.6 | 2.39 | 50.5 |
| 2010 | 960,000 | 456,000 | 504,000 | 19.4 | 9.2 | 10.2 | 2.35 | 48.7 |
| 2011 | 952,000 | 450,000 | 502,000 | 19.1 | 9.0 | 10.1 | 2.31 | 46.9 |
| 2012 | 943,000 | 453,000 | 489,000 | 18.8 | 9.0 | 9.7 | 2.27 | 45.2 |
| 2013 | 941,000 | 446,000 | 495,000 | 18.7 | 8.8 | 9.8 | 2.26 | 43.5 |
| 2014 | 941,000 | 450,000 | 491,000 | 18.6 | 8.8 | 9.6 | 2.25 | 42.0 |
| 2015 | 948,000 | 447,000 | 501,000 | 18.6 | 8.7 | 9.7 | 2.27 | 40.7 |
| 2016 | 952,000 | 455,000 | 497,000 | 18.6 | 8.8 | 9.6 | 2.27 | 39.4 |
| 2017 | 949,000 | 461,000 | 488,000 | 18.3 | 8.8 | 9.3 | 2.25 | 38.1 |
| 2018 | 942,000 | 455,000 | 488,000 | 18.1 | 8.8 | 9.2 | 2.23 | 36.9 |
| 2019 | 938,000 | 461,000 | 476,000 | 17.8 | 8.8 | 8.9 | 2.21 | 35.7 |
| 2020 | 928,000 | 471,000 | 457,000 | 17.5 | 9.0 | 8.5 | 2.18 | 34.6 |
| 2021 | 920,000 | 526,000 | 395,000 | 17.2 | 9.8 | 7.4 | 2.16 | 33.7 |
| 2022 | 909,108 | 493,470 | 415,638 | 16.9 | 9.2 | 7.7 | 2.13 | |
| 2023 | 903,822 | 495,470 | 408,352 | 16.7 | 9.2 | 7.5 | 2.12 | |
| 2024 | 897,269 | 500,068 | 397,201 | 16.5 | 9.2 | 7.3 | 2.10 | |
| 2025 | 888,309 | 506,745 | 381,564 | 16.2 | 9.2 | 7.0 | 2.08 | |
^{1} CBR = crude birth rate (per 1000); CDR = crude death rate (per 1000); NC = natural change (per 1000); TFR = total fertility rate (number of children per woman); IMR = infant mortality rate per 1000 births

=== Registered births and deaths ===
| Year | Population | Births | Deaths | Fertility Rate |
|---|---|---|---|---|
| 1990 | 40,099,550 | | | 3.59 |
| 1995 | | | | 3.49 |
| 2000 | 45,538,330 | | | 2.96 |
| 2003 | | | | 2.21 |
| 2004 | | | | 2.15 |
| 2005 | | | | 2.11 |
| 2006 | | | | 2.09 |
| 2007 | | | | 2.06 |
| 2008 | | | | 2.05 |
| 2009 | | | | 2.04 |
| 2010 | 49,391,000 | | | |
| 2011 | | | | 2.23 |
| 2014 | 51,419,420 | 736,369 | 213,085 | 2.27 |
| 2015 | | 739,152 | 225,526 | 2.26 |
| 2016 | | 765,844 | 213,187 | 2.28 |
| 2017 | | 787,172 | 231,210 | 2.31 |
| 2018 | | 842,816 | 264,620 | 2.40 |
| 2019 | 54,101,000 | 853,432 | 283,570 | 2.42 |
| 2020 | | 735,221 | 290,163 | 2.10 |
| 2021 | | 574,910 | 271,043 | 1.68 |
| 2022 | | 635,227 | 214,037 | 1.84 |
| 2024 | 51,316,756 | | | 1.80 |

Fertility rate numbers for 2014-2019 are vague estimates

=== Total fertility rate ===
Total Fertility Rate (TFR) (Wanted Fertility Rate) and Crude Birth Rate (CBR):

| Year | Total | | Urban | | Rural | |
| Year | CBR | TFR | CBR | TFR | CBR | TFR |
|---|---|---|---|---|---|---|
| 2015–2016 | 18 | 2.3 (2.0) | 16 | 1.9 (1.7) | 18.8 | 2.4 (2.1) |

Crude Birth Rate (CBR), Total Fertility Rate (TFR), and Total Marital Fertility Rate (TMFR) by region (2014 Myanmar Population and Housing Census):

| Region | Crude Birth Rate (CBR) | Total Fertility Rate (TFR) | Total Marital Fertility Rate (TMFR) |
|---|---|---|---|
| Total (Myanmar) | 18.8 | 2.29 | 4.0 |
| Urban | 15.8 | 1.79 | 3.6 |
| Rural | 20.1 | 2.52 | 4.2 |
| Kachin | 22.0 | 2.82 | 5.1 |
| Kayah | 26.1 | 3.34 | 5.7 |
| Kayin | 23.8 | 3.43 | 5.4 |
| Chin | 29.9 | 4.37 | 6.9 |
| Sagaing | 19.4 | 2.32 | 4.4 |
| Tanintharyi | 21.9 | 2.98 | 5.0 |
| Bago | 17.6 | 2.19 | 3.6 |
| Magway | 17.6 | 2.07 | 3.8 |
| Mandalay | 16.9 | 1.94 | 3.7 |
| Mon | 18.1 | 2.44 | 4.2 |
| Rakhine | 18.0 | 2.24 | 3.5 |
| Yangon | 15.5 | 1.72 | 3.3 |
| Shan | 21.2 | 2.67 | 4.3 |
| Ayeyawady | 20.2 | 2.58 | 4.1 |
| Naypyitaw | 18.7 | 2.15 | 3.4 |

| Years | 1925 | 1926 | 1927 | 1928 | 1929 | 1930 | 1931 | 1932 | 1933 | 1934 |
|---|---|---|---|---|---|---|---|---|---|---|
| Total Fertility Rate in Myanmar | 6.03 | 6.03 | 6.03 | 6.03 | 6.03 | 6.03 | 6.03 | 6.03 | 6.03 | 6.03 |

| Years | 1935 | 1936 | 1937 | 1938 | 1939 | 1940 | 1941 | 1942 | 1943 | 1944 |
|---|---|---|---|---|---|---|---|---|---|---|
| Total Fertility Rate in Myanmar | 6.03 | 6.03 | 6.03 | 6.03 | 6.03 | 6.03 | 6.03 | 6.03 | 6.03 | 6.03 |

| Years | 1945 | 1946 | 1947 | 1948 | 1949 |
|---|---|---|---|---|---|
| Total Fertility Rate in Myanmar | 6.03 | 6.03 | 6.03 | 6.03 | 6.03 |

=== Life expectancy ===
| Period | Life expectancy in Years | Period | Life expectancy in Years |
|---|---|---|---|
| 1950–1955 | 36.1 | 1985–1990 | 57.8 |
| 1955–1960 | 41.3 | 1990–1995 | 59.6 |
| 1960–1965 | 44.2 | 1995–2000 | 61.3 |
| 1965–1970 | 49.6 | 2000–2005 | 62.9 |
| 1970–1975 | 51.9 | 2005–2010 | 64.3 |
| 1975–1980 | 54.0 | 2010–2015 | 66.0 |
| 1980–1985 | 56.0 | | |

Source: UN World Population Prospects

== Ethnic groups ==
An ethnolinguistic map of Burma.

Ethnic composition in Myanmar
| Ethnic group | Percent |
| Burman | 68.78% |
| Kayin | 6.69% |
| Rakhine | 4.61% |
| Shan | 4.51% |
| Mon | 2.19% |
| Chin | 2.09% |
| Kachin | 1.50% |
| Karenni | 0.39% |
| Other minorities | 9.24% |

=== Government classifications ===
The Burmese government identifies eight major national ethnic groups (which comprise 135 "distinct" ethnic groups), which include the Bamar (68%), Shan (10%), Karen (7%), Rakhine (4%), Mon (3%), Kayah (1.5%), and Kachin (1.3%). However, the government classification system is flawed, because it groups ethnic groups by geography, rather than by linguistic or genetic similarity (e.g. the Kokang are under the Shan ethnicity, although they are a Han Chinese sub-group).

Unrecognised ethnic groups include Burmese Han-Chinese and Burmese Indians, who form 3% and 2% of the population respectively. The remaining 5% of the population belong to small ethnic groups such as the remnants of the Anglo-Burmese and Anglo-Indian communities, as well as the Lisu, Rawang, Naga, Padaung, Burmese Gurkha, Moken, and many minorities across Shan State.

== Language ==
The official language and primary medium of instruction of Burma is Burmese (65%). Multiple languages are spoken in Burma, that includes Shan (7.4%), Karen (6.2%), Hindi or Urdu (4.3%), Tamil (3%), Kachin (2.1%), Chinese (2%) Chin (1.6%), Bengali (1.3%), Mon (1.8%), and Rakhine (2%), Nepali (1%). Additionally English is spoken as a second language, particularly by the educated urban elite, and is the secondary language learnt in government schools. In recent years, instruction of the Chinese language has been recovered, after long-term limitations from the government of Myanmar.

== Religious affiliation ==
| Religious group | Population % 1973 | Population % 1983 | Population % 2014 (Note: Based on the estimated overall population, including both the enumerated and non-enumerated population (51,486,253), and on the assumption that the non-enumerated population in Rakhine State affiliate with the Islamic faith.) | Population % 2024 |
|---|---|---|---|---|
| Buddhism | 88.8% | 89.4% | 87.9% | 91.3% |
| Christianity | 4.6% | 4.9% | 6.2% | 4.6% |
| Islam | 3.9% | 3.9% | 4.3% | 3.3% |
| Hinduism | 0.4% | 0.5% | 0.5% | 0.6% |
| Tribal religions | 2.2% | 1.2% | 0.8% | 0.2% |
| Other religions | 0.1% | 0.1% | 0.2% | n/a (Note: Enumerated less than 0.1 per cent) |
| Not religious | n/a | n/a | 0.1% | n/a |

Religion in Myanmar
| Faith | % (2008 est.) |
|---|---|
| Total Buddhism | 89% |
| Theravada Buddhism | 89% |
| Mahayana Buddhism | <1% |
| Total Christianity | 4% |
| Baptist | 3% |
| Roman Catholicism | 1% |
| Total Islam | 4% |
| Sunni Islam | 4% |
| Shia Islam | ＞0% |
| Total other religions | <1% |
| Animism | 1% |
| Other (inc. Hinduism) | 2% |

=== Buddhist Sangha ===
Below are statistics regarding the Buddhist monastic community in Myanmar, compiled by the State Sangha Maha Nayaka Committee.

Sangha in Myanmar
| Division | Samanera members | % | Bhikkhu members | % | Sangha members | % |
|---|---|---|---|---|---|---|
| Kachin State | 3,121 | 1.2% | 4,845 | 1.7% | 7,966 | 1.5% |
| Kayah State | 1,300 | 0.5% | 760 | 0.3% | 2,060 | 0.4% |
| Kayin State | 5,967 | 2.4% | 8,113 | 2.9% | 14,080 | 2.6% |
| Chin State | 157 | 0.1% | 300 | 0.1% | 457 | 0.1% |
| Sagaing Region | 25,050 | 9.9% | 29,991 | 10.6% | 55,041 | 10.3% |
| Tanintharyi Region | 3,009 | 1.2% | 6,086 | 2.2% | 9,095 | 1.7% |
| Naypyidaw Union Territory | 5,713 | 2.3% | 5,243 | 1.9% | 10,956 | 2% |
| Bago Region | 18,032 | 7.1% | 32,166 | 11.4% | 50,198 | 9.4% |
| Magway Region | 13,654 | 5.4% | 17,695 | 6.3% | 31,349 | 5.9% |
| Mandalay Region | 47,217 | 18.7% | 52,747 | 18.7% | 99,964 | 18.7% |
| Mon State | 13,466 | 5.3% | 19,303 | 6.8% | 32,769 | 6.1% |
| Rakhine State | 6,395 | 2.5% | 6,548 | 2.3% | 12,943 | 2.4% |
| Yangon Region | 36,654 | 14.5% | 51,788 | 18.3% | 88,442 | 16.5% |
| Shan State | 57,850 | 22.9% | 19,663 | 7% | 77,513 | 14.5% |
| Ayeyawady Region | 15,377 | 6.1% | 27,117 | 9.6% | 42,494 | 7.9% |
| Subtotal | 252,962 | 100% | 282,365 | 100% | 535,227 | 100% |

Thilashin in Myanmar
| Division | Thilashin members | % |
|---|---|---|
| Kachin State | 1,103 | 1.8% |
| Kayah State | 303 | 0.5% |
| Kayin State | 1,000 | 1.7% |
| Chin State | 43 | 0.1% |
| Sagaing Region | 9,915 | 16.4% |
| Tanintharyi Region | 978 | 1.6% |
| Naypyidaw Union Territory | 923 | 1.5% |
| Bago Region | 5,100 | 8.4% |
| Magway Region | 2,473 | 4.1% |
| Mandalay Region | 8,174 | 13.5% |
| Mon State | 3,550 | 5.9% |
| Rakhine State | 534 | 0.9% |
| Yangon Region | 16,960 | 28.1% |
| Shan State | 3,814 | 6.3% |
| Ayeyawady Region | 5,520 | 9.1% |
| Subtotal | 60,390 | 100% |
