= Blimaw language =

Karenic language

Blimaw
- Native to: Myanmar
- Language family: Sino-Tibetan: (Tibeto-Burman); Karen languages; Western Bwe; Blimaw

Language codes
- ISO 639-3: –

Blimaw is a Karenic language of Myanmar.

A word list is available in Shintani (2017).

== Classification ==
Blimaw is classified within the Western Bwe subgroup by Luangthongkum (2019) and is hence closely related to Bwe and Geba. Like Geba, Blimaw preserves the implosives or preglottalised obstruents ɓ/ʔb and ɗ/ʔd, as well as voiceless sonorants such as hn/n̥, hl/l̥, and so forth (see Proto-Karenic language).
