= Richard K. Diran =

American adventurer and gemologist (1949–2024)

- Born: November 3, 1949; United States
- Died: July 17, 2024 (aged 74); Bangkok, Thailand
- Occupations: Gemologist, Artist, Adventurer
- Writing career
- Genre: Ethnography
- Website: www.diranart.com

Richard K. Diran (November 3, 1949 – July 17, 2024) was an American adventurer and gemologist who was also a painter, trader in gemstones, restaurateur, and art dealer. He is best known as the author and photographer of the book The Vanishing Tribes of Burma, which was published in 1997.

== Biography ==
Diran is the son of Edward K. and Dorothy Diran of San Mateo, California. He graduated from San Mateo High School in 1968. Diran was in the first graduating class of the California Institute of the Arts in 1972. He moved to Japan where he earned a black belt in karate in 1974, after which he returned to California, where he graduated from the Gemological Institute of America in 1978 Later Diran and his Japanese wife, Junko, owned the Fuki-ya Japanese Restaurant in the Japan Center (San Francisco) (1978–1989). An article in The Goldsmith magazine claimed that it was the first Robatayaki restaurant in the United States.

Jerry Hopkins and Andy McCoy have mentioned Diran in their published books. Both remember him as part of the business and social scene in Bangkok in the early 1980s.

Diran, who first visited Burma in 1980 as a buyer of gemstones, traveled throughout Myanmar and Cambodia for more than two decades, exploring the art, the then still rarely-visited temples, and visiting still remote tribal peoples as he took photographs and acquired antiquities and gems.

== Antiquities repatriation ==
In 1994 Diran relinquished his claim to an 11th-century Buddha statue from Bagan that he purchased in Thailand for $18,000 and brought to the United States in 1990; no criminal action was pursued against him. Diran had scheduled the statue to be auctioned by Sotheby's in October 1991, expecting to begin bids between $15,000 and $25,000. In 1994, The United States initiated an interpleader proceeding, a civil proceeding, joining Diran and Myanmar as parties to determine the rightful owner of the statue. The sandstone Buddha, which had been stolen from a pagoda near Bagan in 1989 along with three other artifacts, "is widely regarded by scholars as an integral part of Myanmar's Buddhist heritage", and according to Jack Daulton, the attorney representing Myanmar, "was of the utmost rarity, a national treasure". After being confiscated by the FBI, the statue was secured at Northern Illinois University (NIU) during the times of unrest in Burma, until 2012 at which point it was moved to Paris for a few weeks en route to being repatriated and stored in the National Museum of Myanmar by November of that year. Diran's attorney has insisted that Diran had been forthcoming throughout the process, having "declared it through U.S. Customs" when transporting it to the United States, and relinquishing his claim to the statue at a substantial financial loss when its ownership was challenged by the FBI and the government of Myanmar. Daulton counters that there are many clear indications that the statue was not obtained legitimately, including the fact that "It's an extremely rare piece of sculpture, and an object like this has not appeared on the market for years." A publication from NIU on the repatriation of historical artifacts stated that the case "set a legal precedent in the United States for litigation related to the international transport of antiquities."

== Photography: The Vanishing Tribes of Burma ==
Diran's photographs of the tribal peoples of Myanmar have been published as a book and also displayed as a traveling exhibition. Diran took the photos in the book over a period of 17 years. Asiaweek described the book as, "the most comprehensive visual record of Myanmar's many ethnic groups".

Diran's book explores Burma's "cultural diversity," portraying not only the better-described tribal groups, such as the Jinghpaw, the Karen and the Shan, but also lesser-known peoples including the Thet people, (a Rakhine people), the Bre, the Laytoo Chin and the Lahta. Sarah Dudley of the University of Leicester understands Diran's work as salvage ethnography, capturing images of a physical culture on the brink of disappearing. According to essay reviews in Asiaweek and The Japan Times, Diran, entering Myanmar via a series of 7-day tourist visas issued in Bangkok, entered areas of the country barred to foreigners by the military regime either by evading or with the connivance of provincial officials and thereby obtained a unique series of images of societies on the brink of replacing traditional dress and locally woven cloth with modern fabrics and styles. Journalist Bertil Lintner took similar risks to enter Myanmar in this period.

The exhibition features 70 photographs which, according to Diran, include people from "at least 40 distinct ethnic groups, documented over more than 25 years and constituting 'the most comprehensive study of Burmese ethnography since [Sir George] Scott more than 100 years ago.'" Diran has explained that he intended the exhibition to help humanize the many disparate ethnic groups, many of whom have very little knowledge of one another, some of whom have been "linked by the military government to insurgent terrorists". All photos in the exhibition were donated to the National Museum of Myanmar. In 2014 a human rights group in Sweden sponsored an exhibition of Diran's photos to draw attention to ethnic conflict in Myanmar. In Security Council resolution number A-SC-01-01 the United Nations, "Strongly suggests that the importance and heritage of various tribe groups of Myanmar are promoted through measures such as ... inviting visitors to the exhibition "The Vanishing Tribes of Burma", on permanent display at Yangon's National Museum showcasing over 70 photographs by Richard K. Diran.
