= Karenni people =

Ethnic group in Myanmar

Karenni
ꤊꤢ꤬ꤛꤢ꤭ꤜꤟꤤ꤬-ꤖꤢꤨ

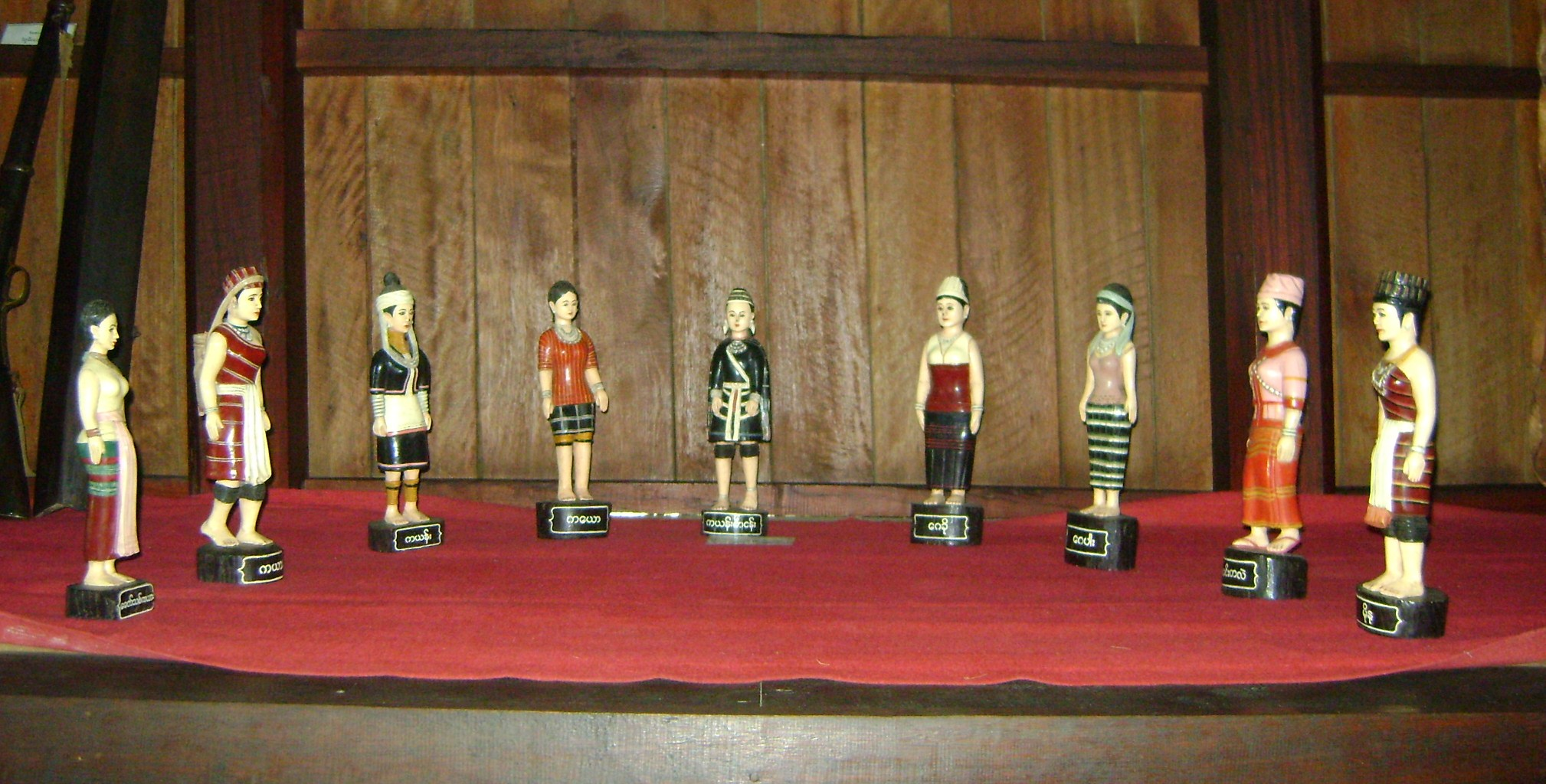
- Figurines representing the nine Karenni subgroups

Total population
- c. 358,000 (est.)

Regions with significant populations
- Myanmar and Thailand

Languages
- Karenni

Religion
- Christianity (Roman Catholic, Baptists and Seventh-day Adventists), Folk religion, Theravada Buddhism

Related ethnic groups
- Karen people, Pa'O people

The Karenni (Burmese: ကရင်နီ, lit. 'red Karen'), also known as the Kayah (Burmese: ကယားလူမျိုး) or Kayah Li (Karenni: ꤊꤢ꤬ꤛꤢ꤭ꤜꤟꤤ꤬), are a Karenic-speaking ethnic group native to the Kayah State of Myanmar.

According to a 1983 census, the Karenni consist of the following groups: Kayah, Geko (Kayan Ka Khaung, Gekho, Kayan Kadao), Geba (Kayan Gebar, Gaybar), Lahwi (Kayan Lahwi), Bre, Manu-Manau (Kayan Manumanao), Yintale, Yinbaw kayan kangan, Bwe and Pa'O. Several of the groups (Geko, Geba, Padaung, Yinbaw) belong to Kayan, a subgroup in region of Karenni. The groups Bre and Manu-Manau belong to the Kayaw subgroup.

Karenni is Kayah/Kayah Li with approximate 90000 populations and the term Karennies is used to merely represent all nine tribes native to the region of the so-called Kayah state. Karennies consist of nine sub-tribes namely Kayah, Padaung (Kayan) (Burmese: ပဒေါင်/ကယန်း), Geko (Burmese: ဂေခို), Geba (Burmese: ဂေဘား), Zayein (Burmese: ဇယိန်), Bre (Burmese: ပရဲ), Manu-Manau (Burmese: မနု-မနော), Yintale (Burmese: ယင်းတလဲ) and Yinbaw (Burmese: ယင်းဘော်).

== Karenni States ==
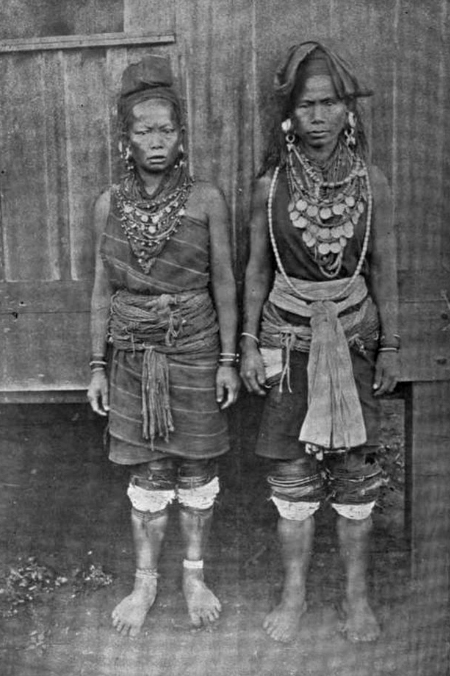
Karenni women in British Burma

The Karenni States were a collection of small states inhabited by Karenni people, ruled by petty princes named myozas. These included Kantarawadi, the only state whose ruler was promoted to a saopha or Sawba (စော်ဘွား) (like that of Maharaja in India), Kyebogyi, Bawlake, Nammekon and Naungpale. They were independent until British rule in Burma, and had feudal ties to the Burmese kingdom. The states bordered the Shan States of Mong Pai, Hsatung and Mawkmai to the north, Thailand to the east, the Papun district of Lower Burma to the south, and a stretch of the Karen Hills inhabited by the Bre and various other small tribes to the west. During British rule, the Karenni had a garrison of military police, which was stationed at the village of Loikaw.

The British government formally recognised and guaranteed the independence of the Karenni States in an 1875 treaty with Burmese king Mindon Min, by which both parties recognised the area as belonging neither to Burma nor to Great Britain. Consequently, the Karenni States were never fully incorporated into British Burma. The Karenni States were recognised as tributary to British Burma in 1892 when their rulers agreed to accept a stipend from the British government. In the 1930s, the Mawchi Mine in Bawlake was the most important source of tungsten in the world. The Constitution of the Union of Burma in 1947 proclaimed that the three Karenni States be amalgamated into a single constituent state of the union, called Karenni State. It also provided for the possibility of secession from the Union after 10 years. In 1952, the former Shan state of Mong Pai was added, and the whole renamed Kayah State, possibly with the intent of driving a wedge between the Karenni (in Kayah State) and the rest of the Karen people (in Karen State), both fighting for independence.

== Gallery ==
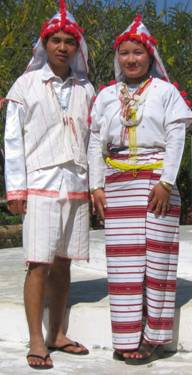
A Kayăn Lahta couple in traditional dress

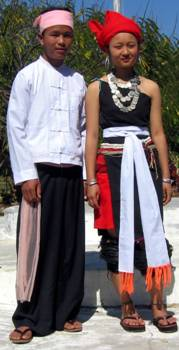
A Kayah (karenni) couple

== Related ==
Karrani dynasty
