= Bwe Karen =

'Bwe or Bwe Karen may be,

- Bwe Karen people
- Bwe Karen language
