= Bwe =

Bwe or BWE may refer to:

- Beneficiary Web Enrollment
- Bwe people or Kayaw, an ethnic group in Myanmar
- Bwe language or Bghai, a Karen language of Burma
- Brainwave entrainment, the hypothesized capacity of the brain to synchronize with external stimuli
- Braunschweig Wolfsburg Airport, IATA airport code BWE
