= Pa'O =

Pa'O may refer to:

- Pa'O language, a Karen language of Burma
- Pa'O people, an ethnic nationality in Burma
