= Kayah Li (Unicode block) =

- Range: U+A900..U+A92F (48 code points)
- Plane: BMP
- Scripts: Kayah Li (47 char.); Common (1 char.)
- Major alphabets: Kayah Li
- Assigned: 48 code points
- Unused: 0 reserved code points

Unicode version history
- 5.1 (2008): 48 (+48)

Unicode documentation
- Code chart ∣ Web page

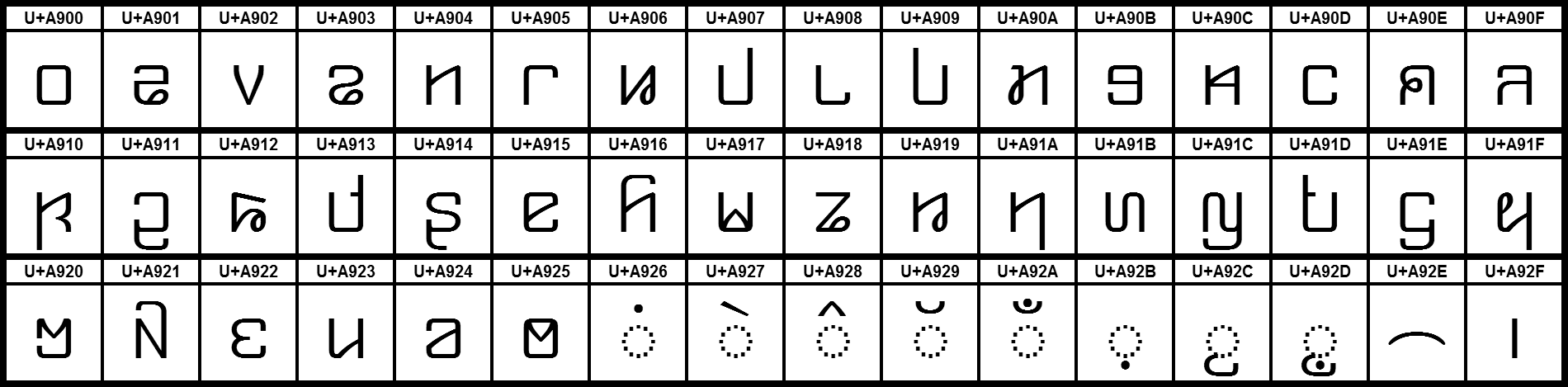
Graphical representation of the Kayah Li Unicode block

Kayah Li is a Unicode block containing characters for writing the Western and Eastern Kayah Li languages in Thailand and Burma.

Kayah Li^{[1]} Official Unicode Consortium code chart (PDF)
| | 0 | 1 | 2 | 3 | 4 | 5 | 6 | 7 | 8 | 9 | A | B | C | D | E | F |
| U+A90x | ꤀ | ꤁ | ꤂ | ꤃ | ꤄ | ꤅ | ꤆ | ꤇ | ꤈ | ꤉ | ꤊ | ꤋ | ꤌ | ꤍ | ꤎ | ꤏ |
| U+A91x | ꤐ | ꤑ | ꤒ | ꤓ | ꤔ | ꤕ | ꤖ | ꤗ | ꤘ | ꤙ | ꤚ | ꤛ | ꤜ | ꤝ | ꤞ | ꤟ |
| U+A92x | ꤠ | ꤡ | ꤢ | ꤣ | ꤤ | ꤥ | ꤦ | ꤧ | ꤨ | ꤩ | ꤪ | ꤫ | ꤬ | ꤭ | ꤮ | ꤯ |
Notes: 1. As of Unicode version 17.0

== History ==
The following Unicode-related documents record the purpose and process of defining specific characters in the Kayah Li block:

| Version | Final code points (Note: Proposed code points and characters names may differ from final code points and names) | Count | L2 ID | WG2 ID | Document |
|---|---|---|---|---|---|
| 5.1 | U+A900..A92F | 48 | L2/99-080 | | Everson, Michael (1999-02-15), Kayah Li script [see duplicate entry L2/99-268] |
| 5.1 | U+A900..A92F | 48 | L2/99-268 | | Everson, Michael (1999-09-06), Kayah Li script [duplicate of L2/99-080] |
| 5.1 | U+A900..A92F | 48 | L2/06-004 | N3024 | Everson, Michael (2006-01-11), Preliminary proposal for encoding the Kayah Li script in the BMP of the UCS |
| 5.1 | U+A900..A92F | 48 | L2/06-073R | N3038R | Everson, Michael (2006-03-09), Proposal for encoding the Kayah Li script in the BMP of the UCS |
| 5.1 | U+A900..A92F | 48 | L2/06-108 | | Moore, Lisa (2006-05-25), "C.2", UTC #107 Minutes |
| 5.1 | U+A900..A92F | 48 | | N3103 (pdf, doc) | Umamaheswaran, V. S. (2006-08-25), "M48.11", Unconfirmed minutes of WG 2 meeting 48, Mountain View, CA, USA; 2006-04-24/27 |
| 5.1 | U+A900..A92F | 48 | L2/13-137 | | Evans, Lorna Priest (2013-06-26), Proposal to Change Script and Script_Extensions properties for U+A92E |
