= KXK =

KXK may refer to

- Komsomolsk-on-Amur Airport (IATA code: KXK), an airbase and airport in Khabarovsk Krai, Russia
- KxK Guitars, an American guitar manufacturer
- Lahta language (ISO 639-3 code: kxk), a language of Burma
