= Kayah Li alphabet =

Alphabet used in Myanmar and Thailand

Kayah Li ꤊꤢꤛꤢ꤭ ꤜꤟꤤ꤬
- Script type: Alphabet
- Period: 1962–present
- Direction: Left-to-right
- Languages: Kayah languages

Related scripts
- Parent systems: Khmer script,Myanmar script: Kayah Li

ISO 15924
- ISO 15924: Kali (357), Kayah Li

Unicode
- Unicode alias: Kayah Li
- Unicode range: U+A900–U+A92F

The Kayah Li alphabet (Kayah Li: ꤊꤢꤛꤢ꤭ ꤜꤟꤤ꤬) is used to write the Kayah languages Eastern Kayah Li and Western Kayah Li, which are members of Karenic branch of the Sino-Tibetan language family. They are also known as Red Karen and Karenni. Eastern Kayah Li is spoken by about 26,000 people, and Western Kayah Li by about 100,000 people, mostly in the Kayah and Kayin states of Myanmar, but also by people living in Thailand.

== History ==
Kayah Li script was devised by Htae Bu Phae in March 1962, in part in response to the appearance of Latin-based orthographies which had appeared after 1950. It is taught in schools in refugee camps in Thailand. Kayah Li’s relation to Brahmic scripts can be seen in its ordering and the shapes of some of its letters, although the shapes of most of them were developed independently. At least nine of its characters bear a relation to characters in the Myanmar script.

== Description ==
Unlike the Myanmar script, the Kayah Li script is an alphabet proper as the consonant letters do not have any subsequent vowel. Four of the vowels are written with separate letter, the others are written using a combination of the letter for a and a diacritic marker. The diacritics can also be used in combination with the letter for ô to represent sounds occurring in loanwords. There is also a set of three diacritics that are used to indicate tone. Unlike the vowel diacritics, that are written above the letter, these are written under.

=== Vowels ===
ꤢ a IPA: [a]	ꤣ ô IPA: [ɤ]	ꤤ i IPA: [i]	ꤥ ò IPA: [o]	ꤢꤦ û IPA: [ɯ]	ꤢꤧ è IPA: [ɛ]	ꤢꤨ u IPA: [u]	ꤢꤩ e IPA: [e]	ꤢꤪ o IPA: [ɔ]

==== Vowels used for loanwords ====
ꤣꤦ ôû IPA: [ɤɯ]	ꤣꤧ ûè IPA: [ɯɛ]	ꤣꤨ ôu IPA: [ɤu]	ꤣꤩ ôe IPA: [ɤe]	ꤣꤪ ôo IPA: [ɤɔ]

=== Tone markers ===
ꤢ꤫ high	ꤢ꤬ low	ꤢ꤭ medial

=== Consonants ===
ꤊ k IPA: [k]	ꤋ kh IPA: [kʰ]	ꤌ g IPA: [ɡ]	ꤍ ng IPA: [ŋ]	ꤎ s IPA: [s]	ꤏ sh IPA: [sʰ]	ꤐ zh IPA: [ʑ]	ꤑ ny IPA: [ɲ]
ꤒ t IPA: [t]	ꤓ ht IPA: [tʰ]	ꤔ n IPA: [n]	ꤕ p IPA: [p]	ꤖ ph IPA: [pʰ]	ꤗ m IPA: [m]	ꤘ d IPA: [d]	ꤙ b IPA: [b]
ꤚ r IPA: [r]	ꤛ y IPA: [j]	ꤜ l IPA: [l]	ꤝ w IPA: [w]	ꤞ th IPA: [ɕ,θ,s]	ꤟ h IPA: [h]	ꤠ v IPA: [v]	ꤡ c IPA: [tɕ]

== Numerals ==
0 ꤀	1 ꤁	2 ꤂	3 ꤃	4 ꤄	5 ꤅	6 ꤆	7 ꤇	8 ꤈	9 ꤉

== Unicode ==
Kayah Li was added to the Unicode Standard in April, 2008 with the release of version 5.1.

The Unicode block for Kayah Li is U+A900–U+A92F:

Kayah Li^{[1]} Official Unicode Consortium code chart (PDF)
	0	1	2	3	4	5	6	7	8	9	A	B	C	D	E	F
U+A90x	꤀	꤁	꤂	꤃	꤄	꤅	꤆	꤇	꤈	꤉	ꤊ	ꤋ	ꤌ	ꤍ	ꤎ	ꤏ
U+A91x	ꤐ	ꤑ	ꤒ	ꤓ	ꤔ	ꤕ	ꤖ	ꤗ	ꤘ	ꤙ	ꤚ	ꤛ	ꤜ	ꤝ	ꤞ	ꤟ
U+A92x	ꤠ	ꤡ	ꤢ	ꤣ	ꤤ	ꤥ	ꤦ	ꤧ	ꤨ	ꤩ	ꤪ	꤫	꤬	꤭	꤮	꤯
Notes 1.As of Unicode version 18.0

== See also ==
- Kayah languages
- Karen people
