= Proto-Karenic language =

Reconstructed ancestor of the Karenic languages

Proto-Karenic
- Proto-Karen
- Reconstruction of: Karenic languages
- Reconstructed ancestor: Proto-Tibeto-Burman

Proto-Karenic or Proto-Karen is the reconstructed ancestor of the Karenic languages.

== Reconstruction ==
The foundation of the reconstruction of Proto-Karen was laid by André-Georges Haudricourt in 1946, with revisions in 1953 and 1975. Haudricourt applied the comparative method to forms from two Karen languages, Pwo and Sgaw, from A Comparative Dictionary of the Pwo-Karen Dialect (1922) by W. C. B. Purser and Saya Tun Aung. Each of these languages has six tones, four in open syllables and two in checked syllables (those ending in a glottal stop). By comparing the lexical incidence of these tones, Haudricourt established eight correspondence sets, later labelled I to VIII by Gordon Luce, six in open syllables and two in checked syllables. The two languages had similar inventories of initial consonants, distinguishing aspirated, unaspirated and implosive stops and having only voiced sonorants. Implosives and sonorants were aligned between the two languages, but aspirated and unaspirated stops yielded three correspondence sets. Moreover, the initial correspondence sets occurred only with certain tone correspondence sets, as follows:

Tone and initial correspondences between Pwo and Sgaw Karen
| Initials (illustrated with bilabials) | Tones | | | |
| Initials (illustrated with bilabials) | *A (modal) | *B < **-s | *B' < **-ʔ | *D < **-p/t/k |
|---|---|---|---|---|
| pʰ:pʰ < *voiceless aspirated stop | 1h:1h (III) | 2h:2h (VI) | 2h:1h (V) | 3h:3h (VIII) |
| m:m < *voiceless sonorant | 1h:1h (III) | 2h:2h (VI) | 2h:1h (V) | 3h:3h (VIII) |
| p:p < *voiceless unaspirated stop | 1b:1h (II) | 2h:2h (VI) | 2h:1h (V) | 3h:3h (VIII) |
| ɓ:ɓ < *implosive stop | 1b:1h (II) | 2h:2h (VI) | 2h:1h (V) | 3h:3h (VIII) |
| pʰ:p < *voiced stop | 1b:1b (I) | 2b:2b (IV) | | 3b:3b (VII) |
| m:m < *voiced sonorant | 1b:1b (I) | 2b:2b (IV) | | 3b:3b (VII) |

This fits a common pattern in languages of the Mainland Southeast Asia linguistic area, including Tai languages, Hmong-Mien languages, Vietnamese and varieties of Chinese, in which a four-tone system, reflecting earlier final segments, develops a register distinction conditioned by the manner of the initial, leading to a tone split. The varying treatment of the first tone is also found in Tai and Chinese languages. Haudricourt's reconstruction was further supported by subsequent reporting that voiced stops and voiceless nasals are retained by other Karen languages, such as Geba. Manson gave a sample of diagnostic words for use during field elicitation to classify Karenic languages:

Diagnostic words for proto-Karen tone and initial categories (Manson 2009)
| Initial consonant | Tone class | | | |
| Initial consonant | *A | *B | *B′ | *D (Note: The checked syllable class, designated *D by Luangthongkum following convention in Tai and other MSEA languages, was labelled as *C by Manson.) |
|---|---|---|---|---|
| Aspirated stops, voiceless sonorants | 1 (III) water [*tʰi] branch [*pʰaŋ] flower [*pʰɔ] chicken [*sʰan] sleep [*m̥i] die [*tʰi] | 4 (VI) star [*sʰa] leaf [*l̥a] fingernail [*m̥i] fire [*m̥e] give [*pʰe] bitter [*kʰa] | 7 (Va) bone [*kʰri] child [*pʰo] right [*tʰwe] spicy [*hɛ] take [*pʰi] pus [*pʰi/mi] | 10 (VIII) sky [*m̥oʔ] iron [*tʰaʔ] pig [*tʰɔʔ] skin/bark [*pʰeʔ] shoot (v.) [*kʰaʔ] dark [*kʰeʔ/kʰuʔ] |
| Voiceless stops, glottalised consonants | 2 (II) silver [*rɔn] ginger [*ʔeŋ] rabbit [*tɛ] navel [*te] spear [*pan] white [*pwa] | 5 (VIa) egg [*ti] cheek [*pu] liver [*sɨn] eat [*ʔam] left [*se] be at, exist [*ʔɔ] | 8 (V) paddy [*pɨ] blow/howl [*ʔu] head [*klo] hand [*su] breathe [*sa] many [*ʔa] | 11 (VIIIa) alcohol [*siʔ] wing [*teʔ] heart [*saʔ] call/shout [*kaʔ] near [*pɔʔ] |
| Voiced stops and sonorants | 3 (I) nest [*bwe] tongue [*ble] person [*bra] name [*min] drunk [*mun] red [*le] | 6 (IV) sun [*mɤ] stone [*loŋ] snake [*ru] arrow [*bla] old [humans] [*bra] hot [*go] | | 12 (VII) monkey [*zoʔ] eye/face [*meʔ] brain [*nɔʔ] intestines [*breʔ] rib [*rɤʔ] deep [*jɔʔ] |

Haudricourt originally viewed the correspondence set V as irregular, and so reconstructed included only the three proto-tones *A, *B and *D. He added the proto-tone *B' in his 1975 revision. Haudricourt's *B' class has been accepted by most modern workers on Karen, but is not included by Luangthongkum. This class is not distinguished after originally voiced initials, but a similar merger is common in Chinese varieties. Correspondence class V is not reflected as a distinct class in any modern Karen language, being merged with *A in Sgaw and Pa'O, with *B in Pwo, with *D in Kayan, Kayaw and Kaya, and with both B* and D* in Bwe-Gaba. Luangthongkum has suggested that the words in class V might reflect an earlier final segment, a view that Haudricourt had also expressed.

== Phonology ==
The phonology of Proto-Karen according to Theraphan Luangthongkum (2019):

=== Onsets ===
Initial consonants
| | | Bilabial | Alveolar | Palatal | Velar | Glottal |
|---|---|---|---|---|---|---|
| Nasals | voiceless | *hm (m̥) | *hn (n̥) | *hɲ (ɲ̥) | *hŋ (ŋ̊) | |
| Nasals | glottalised | | *ʔn | | | |
| Nasals | voiced | *m | *n | *ɲ | *ŋ | |
| Stops | voiceless aspirated | *ph | *th | *ch | *kh | |
| Stops | voiceless unaspirated | *p | *t | *c | *k | |
| Stops | glottal and glottalised | *ʔb (ɓ) | *ʔd (ɗ) | | | *ʔ |
| Stops | voiced | *b | *d | *ɟ | *g | |
| Fricatives | voiceless | | *s | | | *h |
| Approximants | voiceless | *hw (w̥) | *hl (l̥) | | | |
| Approximants | glottalised | *ʔw | *ʔl | *ʔj | | |
| Approximants | voiced | *w | *l | *j | | |
| Rhotic | voiceless | | *hr (r̥) | | | |
| Rhotic | voiced | | *r | | | |

In comparison with Haudricourt's original reconstruction, Luangthongkum has dropped *x and *ɣ, and added *ʔn, *ʔw, *ʔl, *ʔj and *hr.

Consonant clusters
| *Cw- | | | | *Cl- | | | *Cr- | | | | *Crw- | *Cj- | | | |
|---|---|---|---|---|---|---|---|---|---|---|---|---|---|---|---|
| *hnw | *hrw | | | | | | | | | | | | | | |
| | *mw | | *ŋw | *ml | | | | | | | | | | | *ŋj |
| *ʔnw | | | | | | | | | | | | | | | |
| *phw | *thw | *chw | *khw | *phl | | *khl | *phr | *thr | *chr | *khr | *khrw | | | | |
| *pw | | *cw | *kw | *pl | | *kl | *pr | *tr | | | | *pj | | *chj | *kj |
| | *dw | | *gw | *bl | | *gl | *br | | | *gr | | | | | |
| *ʔbw | *ʔdw | | | *ʔbl | | | | | | | | | | | |
| | *sw | | | | *sl | | | *sr | | | | | | | |
| | | | | | | | | | | | | | *rj | | |

=== Rhymes ===
Only Pa'O has a full set of nasal and stop codas, though many occurrences of -p, -t or -k are found in loans from Shan or Pali. Other Karen languages may have nasalized vowels instead of nasal codas, and only glottal stop codas. Some have only open rhymes.

Proto-Karenic rhymes
| | Pure | Glide coda | | Nasal coda | | | | Stop coda | | |
|---|---|---|---|---|---|---|---|---|---|---|
| Front vowel | *-i | | | *-im | *-in | *-iŋ | | *-iʔ | *-it | *-ik |
| Front vowel | *-e | *-ej | | | | *-eŋ | *-eN | *-eʔ | | *-ek |
| Front vowel | *-ɛ | *-ɛj | | *-ɛm | *-ɛn | *-ɛŋ | *-ɛN | *-ɛʔ | | |
| Central vowel | *-ɨ | | | *-ɨm | *-ɨn | *-ɨŋ | *-ɨN | | | |
| Central vowel | *-ə | | | *-əm | | *-əŋ | *-əN | *-əʔ | | |
| Central vowel | *-a | *-aj | *-aw | *-am | | *-aŋ | *-aN | *-aʔ | *-at | |
| Back vowel | *-u | | | | *-un | *-uŋ | *-uN | *-uʔ | | *-uk |
| Back vowel | *-o | | *-ow | *-om | | *-oŋ | | *-oʔ | *-ot | *-ok |
| Back vowel | *-ɔ | | | | | *-ɔŋ | *-ɔN | *-ɔʔ | *-ɔt | |

Here *-N represents an indeterminate nasal (*-m, *-n or *-ŋ).

=== Tones ===
Most linguists accept Haudricourt's revised reconstruction with three proto-tones *A (modal), *B and *B' in open syllables, with checked syllables forming a separate category *D. However, Luangthongkum accepts only *A, *B and *D.

== Sound changes and reflexes ==
=== From Proto-Tibeto-Burman to Proto-Karenic ===
Theraphan Luangthongkum (2014) lists the following sound changes that had taken place during the transition from Proto-Tibeto-Burman (PTB; James Matisoff's reconstruction) to Proto-Karenic (PK; Luangthongkum's own reconstruction).

- Retention of the PTB low central vowel *a in PK
- Retention of the PTB final nasals *-m, *-n, *-ŋ in PK
- PTB *voiced onsets > PK *voiceless or *glottalised onsets
- PTB prefix *s- followed by a stem with *voiced sonorant > PK *voiceless initials
- PTB *voiceless unaspirated stop initials > PK *voiceless aspirated stop initials
- PTB voiced rhotic *-r > PK *-Ø
- PTB *voiceless alveolar fricative *-s > PK *voiceless alveolar stop *-t
- PTB *voiceless stop finals have remained *voiceless stop or have become glottal stop *-ʔ in PK
- PTB high back vowel *u > PK mid back vowel *o (vowel lowering)
- PTB off-gliding rhyme *-iy > PK monophthong *-i
- PTB off-gliding rhyme *-ey > PK monophthong *-e
- PTB off-gliding rhymes *-ay and *-a꞉y > PK monophthong *-e
- PTB off-gliding rhyme *-əy > PK off-gliding rhyme *-ej(ey)
- PTB *prefix-stem and/or *-infix-stem > PK *CC-

=== From Proto-Karenic to modern languages ===
Manson (2011) lists phonological innovations for each of his four primary subgroups of the Karen language branch as follows.

Karen

- Peripheral: proto-voiceless stop initials appearing as aspirated stops (e.g. *p > pʰ)
- Northern: merger of nasal finals (e.g. *am, *an > aɴ), merger of stop-final rhymes with the open counterpart (e.g. *aʔ, *a > a)
- Central: vowel raising (e.g. *a > ɛ)
- Southern: merger of nasal-final rhymes, with the rhyme subsequently raised (e.g. *am, *aŋ > ɔ)

== See also ==
- Proto-Loloish language
- Proto-Tai language
