= Robatayaki =

Japanese method of cooking

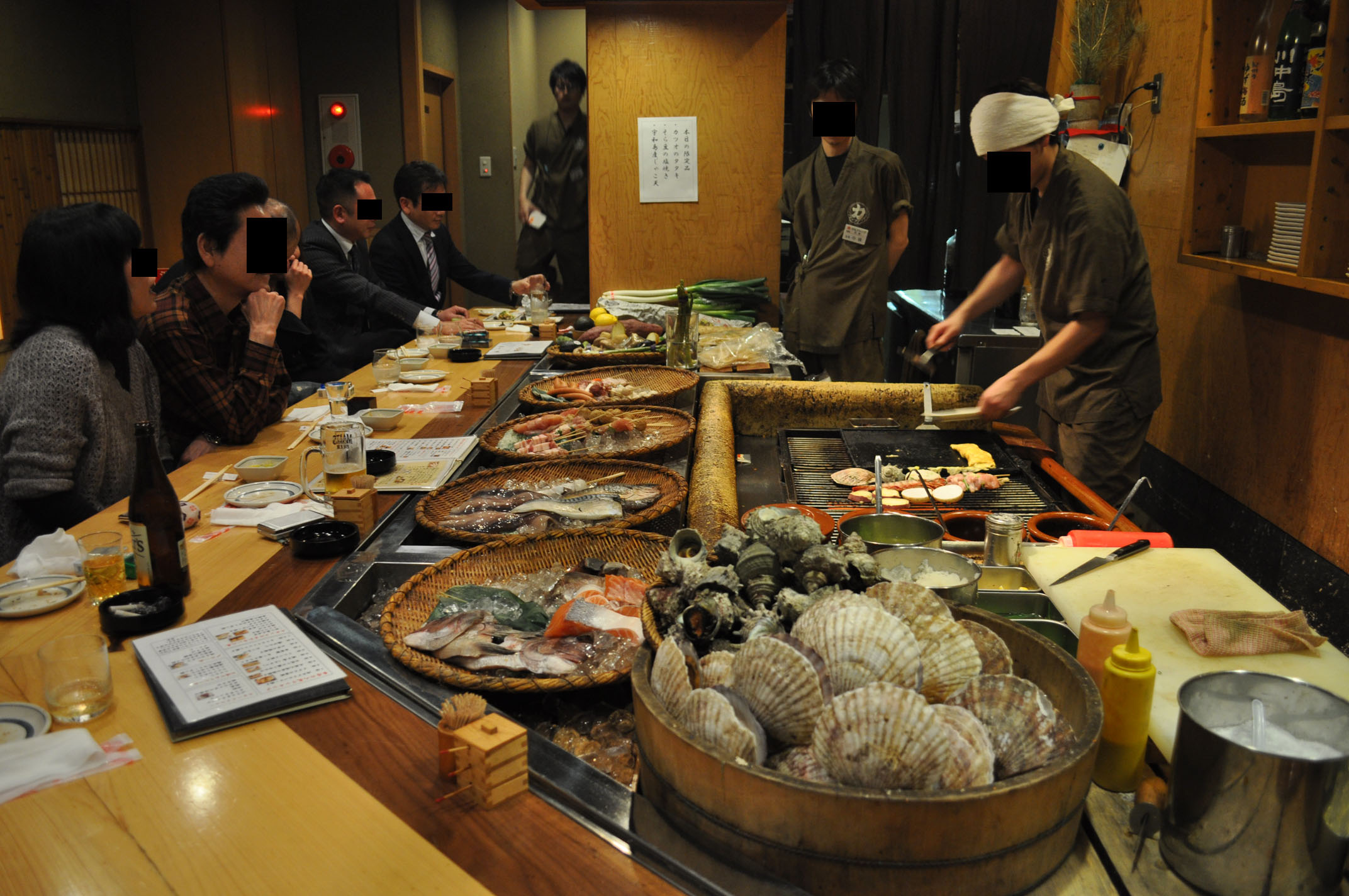
Robatayaki at a restaurant in Osaka (2013)

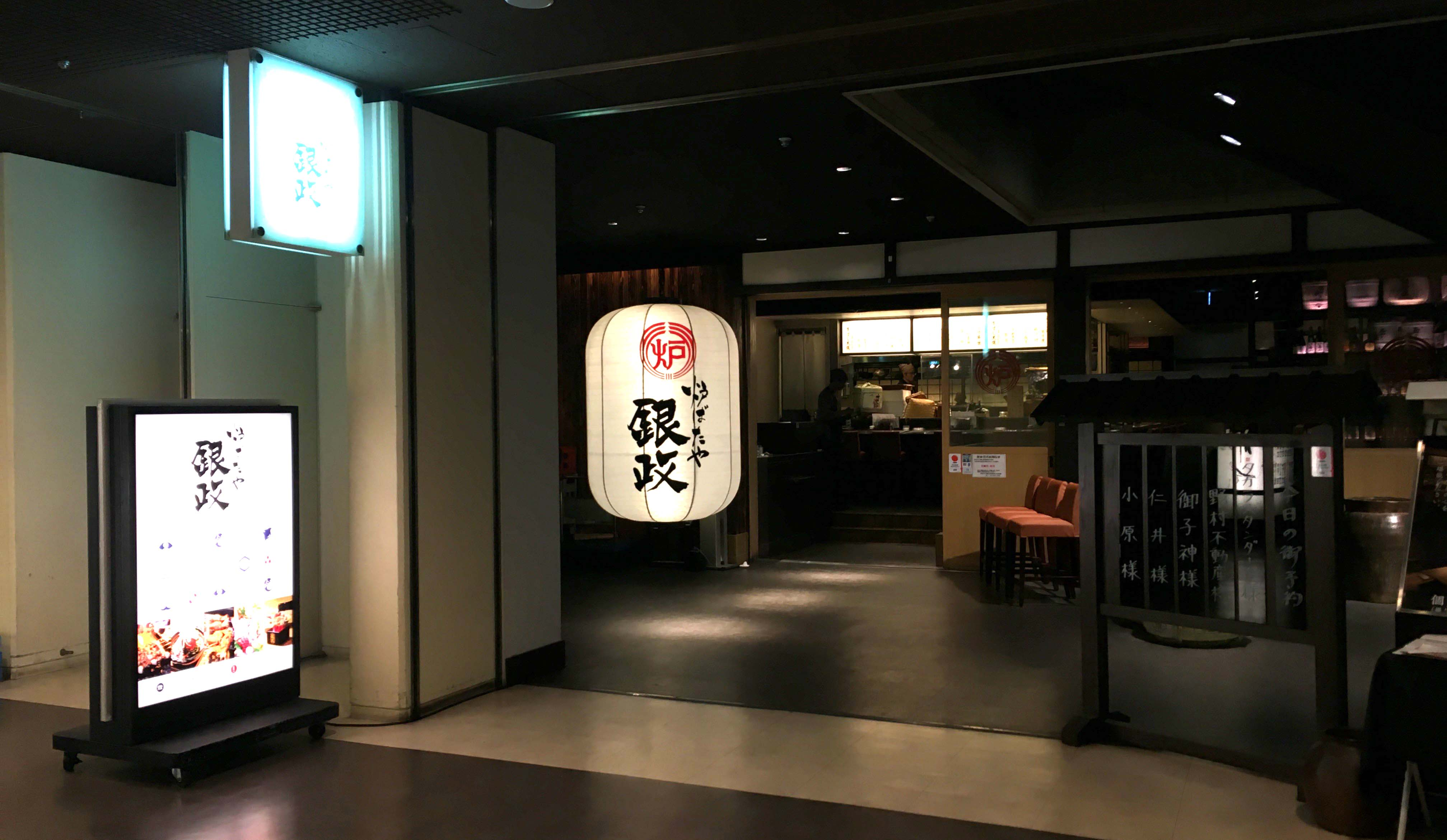
Robataya Ginmasa Shinjuku Nomura Building

In Japanese cuisine, robatayaki (炉端焼き; literally "fireside-cooking"), often shortened to robata (ろばた in hiragana), refers to a method of cooking, similar to barbecue, in which items of food are cooked at varying speeds over hot charcoal. Many Japanese restaurants, both in Japan and abroad, specialize in this style of food preparation. Traditionally, the food consists of a combination of morsels of seafood and vegetables, but other kinds of food that are suitable for grilling may also be offered. The robata cooking style is different from other Japanese charcoal cooking in that it uses a wide, flat open fireplace in the style of an irori, rather than a shichirin or other type of charcoal cooking implement.

== History ==
Robata originates from a centuries-old country style of cooking by northern Japanese fishermen around a communal hearth (irori) that serves as a cooking area and a source of heat, found on the northernmost island of Hokkaido,Japan. The fishermen needed a way to cook on the boats, so they encased binchōtan coals in a stone box to protect the boat from the intense heat. After a government campaign depicting Hokkaido as an idyllic rustic area, this style of cooking became popular all over Japan. The first robata restaurant (named "Robata") opened in Sendai, Miyagi Prefecture. Proving a successful formula, soon more robata restaurants followed, starting in Osaka. As of 1965, there were more than 10,000 such restaurants across the country.

In the fishing village of Kushiro on Hokkaido, many restaurants specialize in this style of cuisine. The Fuki-ya restaurant once owned by Junko and Richard K. Diran in the Japan Center (San Francisco) is said to have been the first robatayaki restaurant in the United States.

== Cultural connotations ==
While the setup varies, a common arrangement has the grill in a central position, whether as a hearth in a sandpit as for the traditional irori, or on a raised dais, around which the customers are seated. In Japan, where the robata restaurant is often also a male-dominated drinking establishment (izakaya), this evokes a highly prized nostalgic feeling among the clientele.

== See also ==
- Teppanyaki, another style of grilling in Japanese cuisine using a hot iron surface.
- Kushiyaki, which can include meat, seafood, or vegetables. It's cooked on a charcoal grill and/or hibachi grill.
