= Bwe people =

Ethnic group of Myanmar

Bwe (Bhweh́)(Bhwế)
ဘွဲ

Regions with significant populations
- Kayin State, Burma
- Burma: 15,700

Languages
- Kayaw language, Bwe Karen language, Sgaw Karen Language and Karenni language

Religion
- Christianity

Related ethnic groups
- Karen people

The Bwe is an ethnic group present in Kayin State in Myanmar. They are also sometimes referred to as the Bghai. Bwe are mostly located in the Thandaunggyi Township of Kayin State.

Language development Literacy rate in L1: Below 1%.

They speak several languages, which included Karen, Karenni, and Burmese. Many were deported to Thailand because of the civil war in Myanmar. They were separated from one another due to the dictatorship in Myanmar. They have a very strong connection and commitment to their country, language, culture and people. Bwe people are now located in the Karenni Refugee camp at section 1. They are religious and mostly Baptists. They have been moving to the United States, Finland, Australia, and Canada since 2006.

== See also ==
- List of ethnic groups in Burma
