= Geko Karen language =

Karen language spoken in Burma

Geko
- Native to: Burma
- Ethnicity: Kayan
- Native speakers: 17,000 Geko (2010); 9,000 Yinbaw (2017)
- Language family: Sino-Tibetan: (Tibeto-Burman); Karen languages; Sgaw–Bghai; Bghai? Kayah?; Geko

Language codes
- ISO 639-3: Either: ghk – Geko kvu – Yinbaw
- Glottolog: geko1235 Geko yinb1236 Yinbaw

Geko is a Karen language of Burma. Yinbaw is reportedly a variety. Speakers of Geko and Yinbaw are ethnically Kayan, as are speakers of Lahta and Padaung.

Kadaw and Taungmying are closely related linguistic varieties.

== Distribution ==
- northern Kayin State: Thandaunggyi township
- southern Shan State: Pekhon township
- Mandalay Region: Yamethin District
- Bago Region: Taungoo District

Yinbaw (population 7,300 as of 1983) is spoken in eastern Shan State and Kayah State.

== Dialects ==
- Geker
- Gekho
- Thaidai (Htideh)
