= Pa'O language =

Karenic language

Pa'O
- Taungthu
- ပအိုဝ်ႏဘာႏသာႏ
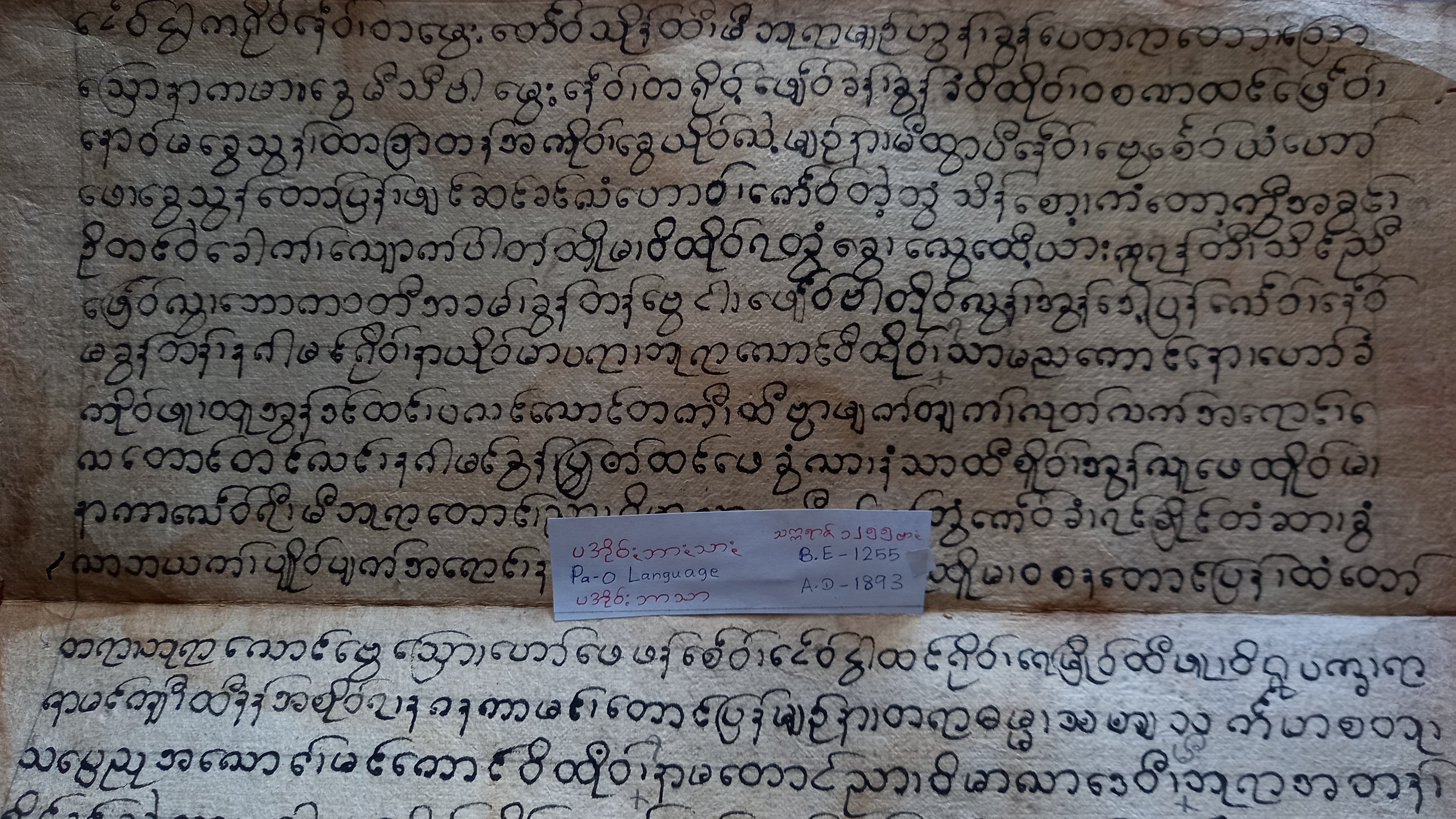
- Pa'O manuscript
- Native to: Myanmar
- Ethnicity: Pa'O
- Native speakers: (860,000 cited 2000–2017)
- Language family: Sino-Tibetan: Tibeto-Burman; Karenic; Northern Karenic; Pa'O
- Writing system: Burmese script (Pa'O alphabet); Karen Braille

Official status
- Recognised minority language in: Myanmar

Language codes
- ISO 639-3: blk
- Glottolog: paok1235

The Pa'O language (also spelled Pa-O or Pa-oh; Pa'o Karen: ပအိုဝ်ႏဘာႏသာႏ,; Burmese: ပအိုဝ်းဘာသာ), sometimes called Taungthu, is a Karenic language spoken by close to 900,000 Pa'O people in Myanmar. Although spoken in both northern and southern parts of the areas covered by the Karenic languages, Pa-O is typically classified as a Northern Karenic language alongside the Kayan language.

The language is primarily written using a Mon-Burmese script devised by Christian missionaries, and many of the materials now available for it on the Internet derive from Christian missionary involvement, although most of the Pa'O are generally reported to be Buddhists.

The language is also referred to by the exonyms "Black Karen" and "White Karen", both of which are terms originally based on traditional clothing colours used in contrast to "Red Karen" (Karenni), also of Myanmar. While most of the community resides in Myanmar, a small number settled across the Thai border as early as 1837.

== Dialects ==
There are two dialects of Pa'O from the towns of Taunggyi and Thaton. These are also called Highland Pa'O or Northern Pa'O for the Taunggyi dialect and the Lowland Pa'O or Southern Pa'O for the Thaton dialect. The Taunggyi Pa'O dialect has many borrowings from its neighbouring Shan language and remained more isolated from the influence of the Burmese language compared to the Thaton dialect. Speakers of the two dialects can have issues with intelligibility leading many to switch to Burmese for easier communication.

The southern dialect features 24 phonemes in comparison to the 20 phonemes of the north. The additional phonemes that the southern dialect features are d͡ʒ, ɲ, ʃ and ç. The d͡ʒ phoneme, however, only appears in the loan word for wheat (/d͡ʒoʊn/) - taken from Burmese ဂျုံ.

There is an additional dialect found in Mae Hong Son province called the Huay Salop dialect. It differs from the Taunggyi dialect, for example, in replacing the /y/ vowel with /ʉ/ or /ə/.

== Phonology ==
The following tables display the phonological features of the northern Pa'O (Taungthu) language:

In addition to these simple phonemes, Pa'O also has five "secondary phonemes" that are used as syllable medial: /-j-/, /-l-/, /-r-/, /-w-/ and /-lw-/. For example, /lá/ (to fall); /ljá/ (to be hot) and /lwá/ (a saw). Some dialects use /-rw-/ rather than /-lw-/

=== Consonants ===
		Labial	Alveolar	Palatal	Velar	Glottal
Plosive	voiceless	p	t	c	k	ʔ
Plosive	aspirated	pʰ	tʰ	cʰ	kʰ	
Plosive	voiced	b	d			
Fricative			s			h
Nasal		m	n		ŋ	
Trill			r			
Approximant	lateral		l			
Approximant	central	w		j		

- /p, t, k, ʔ/ and /m, n, ŋ/ can occur as final consonants. Stops may also be heard as unreleased [p̚, t̚, k̚].

=== Vowels ===
Pa'O has nine cardinal vowels and two glide vowels (diphthongs) as shown in the table below. However, this is a standardization from all Pa'O regional dialects; in reality, the vowel inventories of the various dialects have a much wider range in diversity, including additional cardinal vowels, diphthongs, nasal vowels, and glottal vowels.

	Front	Central	Back
High	i	ʉ	u
High-mid	e		o
Mid		ə	
Low-mid	ɛ		ɔ
Low		a	
Glided	ai̯		au̯

=== Tonemes ===
Pa'O has four phonemic tones: high, high falling, mid and low. Syllables with a coda, can only have the High or Low tones and the presence of a coda can chance the realised tone contours of the High and Low tones. Pa'O also has two types of intonation contours: a rising and a falling contour characterised by the pitch of the last syllable or the intonation phrase.

== Grammar ==
The structure of a Pa'O word is typically monosyllabic. In its rarer disyllabic or trisyllabic words, the stress is placed on the last syllable. Pa'O syllables follow a C(C)(C)Vᵀ or C(C)Vᵀ(C) structure and can be classed into pre-syllables, major syllables and minor syllables.

The Pa'O language features serial verb construction where several verbs are used consecutively as part of a single clause. Like other Karenic languages, Pa'O mostly restricts this serialisation to the nucleus forbidding the object from being inserted in between serialised verbs. This may be due to historical Tibeto-Burman verb-final word order, but research remains limited on Pa'O historical linguistics.

Pa'O also uses secondary verbs which change meaning when used with other main verbs and do not follow the general pattern in verb serialisation. The specific grammatical syntax of certain secondary verbs is a unique difference between Pa'O and other Karenic languages. For example, the word bá (to hit) occurs towards the end of a serialisation in Pa'O while it occurs preverbally in S'gaw Karen. These differences may have developed from influence from Burmese, such as with the word pʰé (to give) while some secondary verbs are directly borrowed from Burmese like the world kʰám (to endure).

== Writing system ==
Pa'O is written using a modified version of the Mon-Burmese script. Below are the consonant letters in Pa'O; additional letters in the Burmese letter inventory are used to transcribe Pali.

Pa'o consonants
က IPA: /k/	ခ IPA: /kʰ/		င IPA: /ŋ/
စ IPA: /c/	ဆ IPA: /cʰ/		ည IPA: /ɲ/
တ IPA: /t/	ထ IPA: /tʰ/	ဒ IPA: /d/	န IPA: /n/
ပ IPA: /p/	ဖ IPA: /pʰ/	ဗ IPA: /b/	မ IPA: /m/
ယ IPA: /j/	ရ IPA: /ɹ/	လ IPA: /l/	ဝ IPA: /w/
သ IPA: /s/	ဟ IPA: /h/	အ IPA: /a/	

Tone markers
ꩻ	ႏ
