= Burmese sign language =

Sign languages of Myanmar

Burmese Sign Language
- Myanmar Sign Language
- Signers: 270,000 (2021)
- Language family: ASL?: Burmese Sign Language
- Dialects: (Yangon) Rangoon; Mandalay

Language codes
- ISO 639-3: ysm
- Glottolog: myan1234

There are one or two known sign languages in Myanmar (Burma). There are three schools for the deaf in the country: the Mary Chapman School for the Deaf in Yangon (est. 1920), the School for the Deaf, Mandalay (est. 1964), and the Immanuel School for the Deaf in Kalay (est. 2005). At least in Yangon, instruction in oral, in the Burmese language, with sign used to support it. The sign of Yangon and Mandalay is different, but it is not clear if they are one language or two. Influences on the language(s) include ASL in all schools, as well as Korean Sign Language, Australian Sign Language, Thai Sign Language, and possibly a local substratum. A government project was set up in 2010 to establish a national sign language with the aid of the Japanese Federation of the Deaf.

Two manual alphabets are in use in Yangon: the American manual alphabet, which may or may not be well known, and a Burmese-based alphabet taught during the 1970s and 1980s.

== Relevant literature ==
- Foote, Ellen. "Negotiating language in a deaf classroom in Myanmar: lessons for mother tongue education." Language, Culture and Curriculum 33, no. 4 (2020): 417-432.
- Foote, Ellen. Sign Languages and Linguistic Citizenship: A Critical Ethnographic Study of the Yangon Deaf Community. Routledge, 2020.
