= Thandaung =

Resort town in Kayin State, Myanmar

Thandaung သံတောင်မြို့
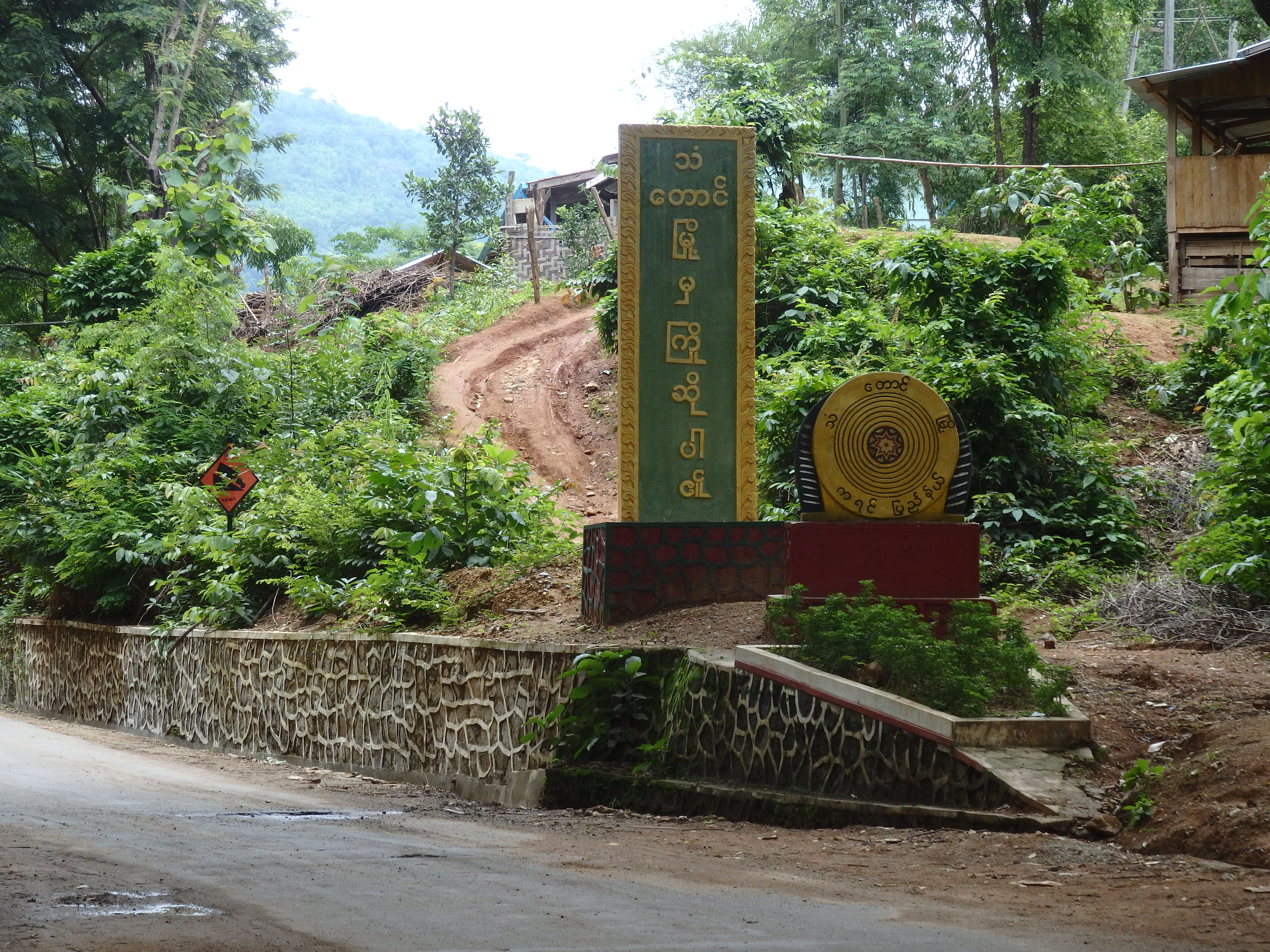

- Location in Burma
- Coordinates: 19°01′18.29″N 96°34′57.56″E
- Country: Myanmar
- Division: Kayin State
- District: Hpa-an District
- Township: Thandaung Township

Population (2005)
  - Religions: Buddhism and Christianity
- Time zone: UTC+6.30 (MST)

Thandaung (Phlone ဍုံသင်တင်; Burmese: သံတောင်မြို့) is a small resort town in the Kayin State of south Myanmar. The majority of its population is Karen. It was developed as a hill station by the British.
