= Bwe Karen language =

Karen language spoken in Burma

Bwe
- Bghai
- Native to: Burma
- Ethnicity: Bwe people
- Native speakers: (17,000 cited 1997)
- Language family: Sino-Tibetan: (Tibeto-Burman); Karen languages; Sgaw–Bghai; Bghai; Bwe

Language codes
- ISO 639-3: bwe
- Glottolog: bwek1238

Bwe, also known as Bwe Karen and Bghai (Baghi), is a Karen language of Burma. It shares 82 to 100% lexical similarity with Geba Karen language.

== Distribution ==
- Kayin State: Thandaung township (about 100 villages)
- Kayah State: Hpruso township
- Bago Region: Taungoo and Hpa-An townships

== Dialects ==
Dialects are Western Bwe Karen and Eastern Bwe Karen. Most comprehend the Western Bwe Karen dialect.

== Phonology ==
Consonants
	Labial	Dental	Palatal	Velar	Glottal
Plosive	p b	t d	c ɟ	k g	(ʔ)
Aspirated	pʰ	tʰ	(cʰ)	kʰ	
Implosive	ɓ	ɗ			
Fricative		θ	ʃ	x	h
Nasal	m	n			
Approximant	w ˀw	l r	j ˀj	ɰ	

- /cʰ/ may be an allophone of /tʰ/, appearing before the vowels /i ɪ/.
- /ʔ/ only appears in the onset when vowels occur word-initially.
- /x/ appears rarely.

Vowels
	Front	Central	Back
High	i		u
Near-high	ɪ		ʊ
Mid-high	e	(ə)	o
Mid-low	ɛ		ɔ
Low		a	

- /ə/ only appears in unstressed syllables.

Bwe Karen also has three tones; high, mid, and low.
