= Padaung language =

Kayan language spoken in Burma

Padaung
- Kayan
- Native to: Burma
- Ethnicity: Kayan people
- Native speakers: 180,000 (2005)
- Language family: Sino-Tibetan: (Tibeto-Burman); Karen languages; Sgaw–Bghai; Bghai; Padaung
- Writing system: Latin

Language codes
- ISO 639-3: pdu
- Glottolog: kaya1315

Kayan, also known as, Padaung of Burma, spoken by the Kayan people. The Kayan dialects share more than 90% lexical similarity. Padaung is 71% to 76% lexically similar to Lahta.

== Distribution ==
- Pekhon, southern Shan State
- northwestern Kayah State
- Thandaung township, Kayin State
- Pyinmana township, Mandalay Region
- Kayan Lahwi dialect: Lahwi and northwest Dimawso, Kayah State; southern Pekhon, southern Shan State
- Kayan Yinbaw/Kangan dialect: Dimawso area, northwestern Kayah State

== Internal classification ==
The Kayan languages are spoken in Kayah State, southern Shan State, and northern Karen State. There are four branches according to Shintani (2016), namely:

- Kangan ("lowland dwellers")
- Kakhaung ("highland dwellers")
- Lawi ("South")
- Latha ("North")

Nangki (sometimes called Langki), documented in Shintani (2016), is one of the Kayan languages belonging to the Kakhaung subgroup. It is spoken only in one village.

Pekong Kayan is documented in Manson (2010).

Sonkan Kayan and Dosanbu Kayan are documented in Shintani (2018a, b). Shintani has also documented:by families or by villages as below:

- Phulon Kayan
- Lagu Kayan
- Totan Kayan
- Dokhoncon Kayan
- Natwei Kayan
- Pimon Kayan
- Sonplao Kayan
- Dolan Kayan
- Thaoku Kayan
- Diklon Kayan
- Pulon Kayan
- Kabla Kayan
- Kathan Kayan
- Kalondei Kayan
- Ramaku, Subao, Kadu, Huason, Hanti, Sonpu Kayan (Shintani 2022)

Dimawso Kayan, a Kayan variety spoken in Wanbanbalo village, Dimawso township, Kayah State, Myanmar, is described in Lew (2018).

Ethnologue lists Padaung (Kayan) dialects as:

- Standard Pekon (prestige dialect)
- Kayan Lahwi
- Kayan Kangan (Yeinbaw, Yinbaw)

== Phonology ==
=== Consonants ===
		Labial	Dental/ Alveolar	Palatal	Velar	Glottal
Plosive	voiceless	p	t	c	k	ʔ
Plosive	aspirated	pʰ	tʰ	cʰ	kʰ	
Plosive	voiced	b	d	ɟ	ɡ	
Fricative			θ			h
Nasal		m	n		ŋ	
Rhotic			ɾ			
Approximant	lateral		l			
Approximant	central	w		j		

- Voiced stops /b, d/ can also range to pre-glottalized stops [ʔb, ʔd] in free variation among speakers.
- /θ/ shows fluctuation to [s] in some closely related dialects.
- /ɾ/ is heard as a glide [ɹ] in syllable-medial position. It is heard as a tap [ɾ] elsewhere.

=== Vowels ===
	Front	Central	Back
High	i	ɨ	u
High-mid	e	ə	o
Low-mid	ɛ		ɔ
Low		a	
Diphthongs	ai	əɨ	au

Nasal coda
	Front	Central	Back
Mid	eŋ	əŋ	oŋ
Low		aŋ	

- Sounds /ɨ, a, ə, u/ phonetically range to [ɨ̠, a̟, ɤ̟, ʊ] in free variation.
- Breathiness [V̤] is also evenly distributed among all sounds.
