= Kayaw language =

Karen language spoken in Burma

Kayaw
- Brek
- Native to: Myanmar
- Ethnicity: Bwe people
- Native speakers: (17,000 cited 1983 census)
- Language family: Sino-Tibetan: (Tibeto-Burman); Karen languages; Sgaw–Bghai; Kayaw

Language codes
- ISO 639-3: kvl
- Glottolog: brek1238

Brek, also known as Brek Karen, Bre, and Kayaw, is a Karen language of Burma.

== Distribution ==
- eastern Kayah State (30 villages)
- northeastern Kayin State: Yado area
- southern Shan State: Pekon township

== Dialects ==
- Bwe-Kayaw
- Upper Kayaw (standardized variety used for literature)
- Lower Kayaw

== Writing system ==
Kayaw alphabet
Majuscules	A	Ǎ	Ā	B	C	D	E	Ě	Ē	È	È̌	È̄	G	H	I	Î	Î̌	Î̄	J	K	L	M	N	O	Ǒ	Ō	Ò	Ò̌	Ò̄	Ô	Ô̄	P	R	S	T	U	Ǔ	Ū	Û	Û̌	Û̄	W	Y
Minuscules	a	ǎ	ā	b	c	d	e	ě	ē	è	è̌	è̄	g	h	i	î	î̌	î̄	j	k	l	m	n	o	ǒ	ō	ò	ò̌	ò̄	ô	ô̄	p	r	s	t	u	ǔ	ū	û	û̌	û̄	w	y
