= Karenic languages =

Language family

Karenic
- Geographic distribution: South-eastern Myanmar, Western Thailand
- Ethnicity: Karen people
- Native speakers: 4.5 million (2017)
- Linguistic classification: Sino-Tibetan: Tibeto-Burman; Karenic
- Proto-language: Proto-Karenic
- Subdivisions: Sgaw; Pa'O; Pwo

Language codes
- ISO 639-2 / 5: kar
- Glottolog: kare1337

The Karen (/kəˈrɛn/ kə-REN) or Karenic languages are tonal languages spoken by some 4.5 million Karen people. They are of unclear affiliation within the Sino-Tibetan languages. The Karen languages are written using the Karen script. The three main branches are Sgaw (commonly known as Karen), Pwo and Pa'O. Karenni (also known as Kayah or Red Karen) and Kayan (also known as Padaung) are a branch of Karen languages. They are unusual among the Sino-Tibetan languages in having a subject–verb–object word order; other than Karen, Bai and the Chinese languages, Sino-Tibetan languages have a subject–object–verb order. This is likely due to influence from neighboring Mon and Tai languages.

== Classification ==
Because they differ from other Tibeto-Burman languages in morphology and syntax, Benedict (1972: 2–4, 129) removed the Karen languages from Tibeto-Burman in a Tibeto-Karen branch, but this is no longer accepted.

A common geographical classification distinguishes three groups:

Northern
Pa’o
Central
The area of greatest diversity, including Kayah (Red Karen or Karenni), Kayaw (Brek), Bwe (Bghai), Geba and many more.
Southern
Pwo and Sgaw

Kayan (Padaung) is transitional between the northern and central groups. The languages with the most speakers are Sgaw, Pwo and Pa’o.

=== Manson (2011) ===
Manson (2011) classifies the Karen languages as follows, with each primary branch characterized by phonological innovations:

Karen

- Peripheral: proto-voiceless stop initials appearing as aspirated stops (e.g. *p > pʰ)
  - Pa’o
  - Pwo
- Northern: merger of nasal finals (e.g. *am, *an > aɴ), merger of stop-final rhymes with the open counterpart (e.g. *aʔ, *a > a)
  - Kayan
  - Lahta
  - Yinbaw/Kayan
  - Yintale
- Central: vowel raising (e.g. *a > ɛ)
  - Western Kayah, Eastern Kayah
  - Geba, Bwe
  - Paku (?)
  - Geker/Kayan Geku, Gekho (?; may be Central or Southern)
  - Kayaw, Manu (?; may be Central or Southern)
- Southern: merger of nasal-final rhymes, with the rhyme subsequently raised (e.g. *am, *aŋ > ɔ)
  - Sgaw, Paku
  - Dermuha, Palaychi

The classifications of Geker, Gekho, Kayaw, and Manu are ambiguous, as they may be either Central or Southern.

=== Shintani (2012) ===
Shintani Tadahiko (2012:x) gives the following tentative classification, proposed in 2002, for what he calls the "Brakaloungic" languages, of which Karen is a branch. Individual languages are marked in italics.

- Brakaloungic
  - Pao
    - Pao
  - Karen
    - Kayah-Padaung
      - Kayah
      - Pado-Thaido-Gekho
        - Thaidai
        - Pado-Gekho
          - Gekho
          - Padaung
            - Padaung (Kayan)
            - Gekho (Yathu Gekho)
    - Bwe
      - Bweba-Kayaw
        - Kayaw
        - Bweba
          - Geba
          - Bwe
    - Sgaw-Pwo
      - Pwo
      - Mobwa
        - Mopwa
        - Blimaw
      - Pako-Sgaw
        - Sgaw
        - Pakubwa
          - Paku
          - Monebwa
          - Thalebwa

However, at the time of publication, Shintani (2012) reports that there are more than 40 Brakaloungic languages and/or dialects, many of which have only been recently reported and documented. Shintani also reports that Mon influence is present in all Brakaloungic languages, while some also have significant Burmese and Shan influence.

The Kayan languages are spoken in Kayah State, southern Shan State, and northern Karen State. There are four branches according to Shintani (2016), namely Kangan ("lowland dwellers"), Kakhaung ("highland dwellers"), Lawi ("South"), and Latha ("North"). Nangki (sometimes called Langki), documented in Shintani (2016), is one of the Kayan languages belonging to the Kakhaung subgroup. It is spoken only in one village.

Kadaw is spoken in Kayah State, and has nasalized vowels but no final nasal consonants. It has more Burmese than Shan influence. Thamidai is yet another Karenic language.

Below is a classification of the Karenic languages by Hsiu (2019) based on a phylogenetic analysis of Shintani's published lexical data. The results support the overall structure of Shintani's (2012) classification.

- Karenic
  - Pa'o
    - Northern
    - Southern
  - Karen
    - Kayan (Padaungic)
      - Kayin Phyu
      - Yathu Gekho
      - Thaidai
      - Padaung cluster: Padaung, Yinbaw, Kangan ("lowland") Kayan, Kakhaung ("highland") Kayan
      - Gekho cluster: Gekho, Kadaw, Taungmying
      - Nagi (Nangki) Kayan
      - Latha ("North") Kayan, Zayein
      - Thamidai
    - Kayah (Karenni)
      - West Kayah, Manaw
      - Yingtalay
    - Manu-Bwe
      - Manu
      - Bwe
        - East Kayaw
        - West Kayaw
        - Bwe
        - Geba
    - Mopwa-Pwo-Sgaw
      - Mopwa, Blimaw
      - Pwo-Sgaw
        - Pwo
        - Sgaw cluster
          - Sgaw
          - Monebwa, Paku
          - Thalebwa

=== Luangthongkum (2019) ===
Luangthongkum (2019) recognizes three branches of Proto-Karen, namely Northern, Central, and Southern, but is agnostic about how the three branches fit together.

Karenic

- Northern
  - Northern Pa-O
  - Southern Pa-O
- Central
  - Kayan
  - Kayah
  - Western Bwe (Blimaw, Geba)
  - Kayaw
- Southern
  - Northern Sgaw
  - Southern Sgaw
  - Northern Pwo
  - Southern Pwo

Note: Western Bwe Karen (Blimaw, Geba) preserves the implosives or preglottalised obstruents ɓ/ʔb and ɗ/ʔd, as well as voiceless sonorants such as hn, hl, and so forth.

== Language Contact in Karenic Languages ==
The Karenic languages exist as minority languages, experiencing contact from the national languages of the region, such as Standard Thai, and Burmese. In contact situations, this division between majority and minority languages can bring about contact induced language variation and change. This appears to be the case for the Karenic languages, as evidenced by some syntactical and phonological features. Given the contact-induced changes that have already occurred, the current social hierarchy in regard to Karenic languages, and language attitudes, the Karenic Languages are candidates for contact induced change.

=== Syntax ===
The Karenic languages have an unusual syntactic ordering for their language family, that of Subject-Verb-Object; In contrast, most Sino-Tibetan Languages use the syntactic Subject-Object-Verb ordering. Reconstructions of the Tibeto-Burman Languages postulate that the Subject-Object-Verb ordering is genetic, while the current ordering is due to contact induced change-- possibly from standard Thai. There is another Sino-Tibetan language, Bai, that also uses Subject-Verb-Object word order. It is postulated that this is also due to language contact with Sinitic languages rather than evidence of Subject-Object-Verb structuring being genetically inherent to the language.

=== Phonology ===
Some studies show that there may even be contact induced phonological changes among speakers of Phrae Pwo Karen in Thailand. Phrae Pwo Karen is a dialect of Northeastern Pwo Karen. A study by Intajamornrak (2012) compared the production of three different generations of Phrae Pwo Karen: Participants over 60, Participants between the ages of 35-50, and Participants 25 and under. The oldest group had the least contact with the Tai languages, and each of the following generations has increasing contact with Tai languages. The two younger generations are showing a shift in their vowel production, which the researchers believe suggests contact induced change. Furthermore, the youngest generation is showing shifts in their tonal trajectories, evidencing their contact with Tai Yuan, and Standard Thai.

This may, however, vary by village and by phonological feature. Kerdpol et al. (2016) conducted a study on generational productions of nasality in another province of Thailand, Mae Hong Son. It was expected that in comparing the younger generation to the older generation, the younger group’s nasal vowels in Pwo Karen would lose some of their nasal quality, and that furthermore nasal final consonants would emerge due to the higher contact with Standard Thai. The older group indeed had both longer nasalization duration for vowels, which suggests the tendency to preserve nasality. However, the cases where the younger group shortened the nasal feature, or denasalized it entirely may be due to vocal quality. Furthermore, the production of final nasal consonants in certain contexts was present across all the generations. These things led the authors to conclude there was no indication that these changes were induced by Standard Thai.

=== Social Features for Change ===
When contact based structural changes such as syntactic ordering occur, it is often due to a more intense contact. These changes are indicators of social conditions that foster contact-induced changes which can include demographic-political relations.

Regarding Karen, none of the dialects are officially recognized any longer in any public sphere in Burma, nor was it ever in Thailand. While this political structure can pressure communities into language change, it is not, however, the most powerful force. Language attitudes and speakers’ preferences towards the languages they speak and use can be a predictor of language usage and shift. However, these domains may not be fully separated in Thailand, where speakers prefer to learn the language(s) of power, namely Standard Thai.

Language attitudes and ideologies absorbed vary according to the individual even when they have similar backgrounds. Nonetheless, a survey of language attitudes of Karen communities in various provinces in Thailand found a positive correlation between language vitality and language attitudes in the community: the more positive the language attitude, the higher the language vitality. There were reports in the study of younger generations using Karen less, having a negative language attitude toward the language, and experiencing discrimination due to their ethnic identity. However, according to the survey, most Karen speakers believe that speaking the language is an advantage, not inferior to Thai, and as such is widely used in the communities.
