= Geba Karen language =

Karen language of Burma

Geba
- Native to: Burma
- Native speakers: 40,000 (2010)
- Language family: Sino-Tibetan: Karen languages; Sgaw–Bghai; Bghai; Geba

Language codes
- ISO 639-3: kvq
- Glottolog: geba1237

Geba, also known as Eastern Bwe, is a Karen language of Burma.

== Distribution ==
- Northern Kayin State: Thandaunggyi township (140 villages)
- Bago Region
- Mandalay Region: Pyinmana township
- Shan State: Pekon and Pinlaung townships
- Kayah State

== Dialects ==
- Sawkho
- Gerkho-Geba
- Thamitaik (Sawkeepho)

== Phonology ==
The consonant inventory of Geba is presented below. The consonants in parentheses occur rarely and confirming whether they are phonemes would require further research.

		Labial	Dental	Alveolar	Palatal	Post-alveolar	Velar	Glottal
Plosives	Voiceless aspirated	pʰ		tʰ		tʃʰ	kʰ	
Plosives	Voiceless unaspirated	p		t		(tʃ)	k	ʔ
Plosives	Voiced	b		d		dʒ	ɡ	
Implosives		ɓ		ɗ				
Fricatives	Voiceless aspirated			sʰ				
Fricatives	Voiceless unaspirated		θ	s		ʃ	(x)	h
Fricatives	Voiced						(ɣ)	(ɦ)
Nasals	Voiceless	m̥		n̥				
Nasals	Voiced	m		n			(ŋ)	
Approximants	Voiceless	w̥		l̥				
Approximants	Voiced	w		l	j			
Trills				r				
