= Karenni language =

Karenic dialect continuum

Karenni
- Kayah
- ꤊꤢꤛꤢ꤭ ꤜꤟꤤ꤬ ကယး လီူး; ကရင်နီ
- Native to: Burma, Thailand
- Ethnicity: Karenni
- Native speakers: (187,000 cited 2000–2007)
- Language family: Sino-Tibetan: Karen languages; Sgaw–Bghai; Karenni
- Writing system: Kayah Li (eky,kyu); Latin (kyu,kxf); Myanmar (kyu,kxf) unwritten (kvy)

Official status
- Recognised minority language in: Myanmar; Thailand

Language codes
- ISO 639-3: Variously: eky – Eastern Kayah kyu – Western Kayah kvy – Yintale kxf – Manumanaw (Manu)
- Glottolog: kaya1317 Kayah yint1235 Yintale Karen manu1255 Manumanaw Karen

Karenni or Red Karen (Kayah Li: ꤊꤢꤛꤢ꤭ ꤜꤟꤤ꤬; Burmese: ကရင်နီ), known in Burmese as Kayah (Burmese: ကယား), is a Karen dialect continuum spoken by over half a million Kayah people (Red Karen) in Burma.

The name Kayah has been described as "a new name invented by the Burmese to split them off from other Karen".

Eastern Kayah is reported to have been spoken by 260,000 in Burma and 100,000 in Thailand in 2000, and Western Kayah by 210,000 in Burma in 1987. They are rather divergent. Among the Western dialects are Yintale and kayahManu (Manumanaw in Burmese).

== Distribution and varieties ==
Eastern Kayah is spoken in:

- Shadaw township, Kayah State (east of the Thanlwin River)
- Langkho district, Shan State

Eastern Kayah dialects are Upper Eastern Kayah and Lower Eastern Kayah, which are mutually intelligible. The speech variety of Huai Sua Thaw village (Lower Eastern) is prestigious for both dialect groups. The Eastern Kayah have difficulty understanding the Western Kayah.

Western Kayah is spoken in Kayah State and Kayin State, east of the Thanlwin River. It is also spoken in Pekon township in southern Shan State.

- northern dialect: Shan State (north of Loikaw)
- southern dialect: Hpruso and Dimawso townships (south of Loikaw)

Western Kayah dialects are part of a dialect continuum of Central Karen varieties stretching from Thailand. They include:

- Northern dialect of Western Kayah
- Southern dialect of Western Kayah
- Dawtama
- Dawnnyjekhu
- Sounglog
- Chi Kwe
- Wan Cheh

Yintale, reportedly a variety of Western Kayah, is spoken in 3 villages of Hpasawng township, Bawlakhe district, Kayah State.

Yintale dialects are Bawlake and Wa Awng.

Kawyaw, reportedly similar to Western Kayah, is spoken in 23 villages along the border of Bawlake and Hpruso townships, in the West Kyebogyi area of Kayah State.

Kawyaw dialects are Tawkhu and Doloso, which have been reported to be difficult to mutually understand.

== Phonology ==
=== Consonants ===
Consonants in Western Kayah
		Labial	Dental	Alveolar	Post-alv./ Palatal	Velar	Glottal
Plosive	voiceless	p		t		k	
Plosive	aspirated	pʰ		tʰ		kʰ	
Plosive	voiced	b		d		ɡ	
Affricate					tʃ		
Fricative	voiceless		θ		ʂ		h
Fricative	aspirated			sʰ			
Fricative	voiced	v		z	ʝ		
Nasal		m		n	(ɲ)	ŋ	
Rhotic				ɾ			
Approximant	lateral			l			
Approximant	central	w			j		

- /sʰ/ is heard as a palato-alveolar [ʃ] before high-front vowels.
- /ŋ/ is heard as a palatal [ɲ] before front or mid vowels.
- /ɾ/ may also be heard as a trill [r].

Consonants in Eastern Kayah
		Labial	Dental/ Alveolar	Post- alveolar	Palatal	Velar	Glottal
Plosive/ Affricate	voiceless	p	t	tɕ		k	(ʔ)
Plosive/ Affricate	aspirated	pʰ	tʰ	tɕʰ		kʰ	
Plosive/ Affricate	voiced	b	d	dʑ			
Fricative		(v)	s	(ɕ)	(ʝ)		h
Nasal		m	n		(ɲ)	ŋ	
Approximant	lateral		l				
Approximant	central	w		ɻ	j		

- /tɕ/ may also be occasionally be realized as [ɕ].
- /j/ may also be heard as a palatal fricative [ʝ].
- /ŋ/ may also be heard as palatal [ɲ] when before front vowels and /j/.
- /ɻ/ may also be heard as a trill [r] among emphatic speech.
- /w/ may also be heard as [v] in free variation.
- A glottal stop [ʔ] is heard in zero-initial position before an initial vowel.

=== Vowels ===
==== Western ====
Vowels in Western Kayah
	Front	Central	Back	
High	i		ɯ	u
High-mid	e	ə	ɤ	o
Low-mid	ɛ		ɔ	
Low		a		
Diphthong			ɯᵊ	

Breathy vowels
	Front	Central	Back	
High	i̤		ɯ̤	ṳ
High-mid	e̤	ə̤	ɤ̤	o̤
Low-mid	ɛ̤		ɔ̤	
Low		a̤		
Diphthong			ɯ̤ᵊ	

==== Eastern ====
Vowels in Eastern Kayah
	Front	Central	Back	
High	i		ɯ	u
High-mid	e		ɤ	o
Low-mid	ɛ	ə	ɔ	
Low		a		

- /ə/ may also be heard as a centralized [ʌ̈].

== Writing system ==
According to Aung 2013, Manumanaw Karen does not yet have a standardized script. Catholic missionaries developed a spelling using the Latin script which is used in religious documents, including the translation of the Bible. A Manumanaw Karen literature committee has been set up and is developing literacy programs with SIL, using spelling based on Burmese script, so that it is accepted by Catholics and Baptists.

Manumanaw Karen Latin Alphabet
a	b	c	d	e	è	g	h	j	i	î	k	kh	l	m	n	o	ô	ò	p	ph	r	s	sh	t	ht	u	û	w	y

The tones are indicated using the caron, the acute accent or without the addition of these on the vowels: ⟨á, é, è́, í, î́, ó, ố, ò́, ú, û́⟩, ⟨ǎ, ě, è̌, ǐ, î̌, ǒ, ô̌, ò̌, ǔ, û̌⟩. The diaeresis below is used to indicate the breathy voice on the vowels: ⟨a̤, e̤, i̤, o̤, ṳ⟩.

Western Kayah Latin Alphabet
a	b	c	d	e	f	g	h	i	j	k	l	m	n	o	p	q	r	s	t	u	v	w	x	y	z

Seven digraphs are used.

Digraph
ng	ht	kh	ph	th	ny	gn

The five vowels of the alphabet are supplemented by four accented letters representing their own vowels.

Vowels
a	e	i	o	u	è	ò	ô	û

Tones are represented using the acute accent and the caron over the vowel. The breathy voice is indicated with an umlaut below the vowel letter. Breathy voiced vowel letters can also have a diacritic indicating the tone.

Tones
High	á	é	í	ó	ú	è́	ò́	ố	û́
Medium	ǎ	ě	ǐ	ǒ	ǔ	è̌	ò̌	ô̌	û̌
Breathy	a̤	e̤	i̤	o̤	ṳ	è̤	ò̤	ô̤	ṳ̂
