= Lahta language =

Karen language spoken in Burma

Lahta
- Native to: Burma
- Region: Southern Shan State
- Ethnicity: Kayan
- Native speakers: (20,000 cited 2000–2017)
- Language family: Sino-Tibetan: (Tibeto-Burman); Karenic; Sgaw–Bghai; Bghai; Lahta
- Writing system: Burmese script

Language codes
- ISO 639-3: Either: kxk – Zayein kvt – Lahta
- Glottolog: zaye1235

Lahta, or Zayein, is a Karenic language of Burma.

== Distribution ==
Lahta is spoken in:

- Shan State: Pekhon (Phaikum) and Pinlaung townships
- Mandalay Region: Pyinmana township

Zayein Lahta is spoken in between Mobye and Phekon towns in southern Shan State. Zayein may be a dialect of Lahta.

== Sources ==
- Ywar, Naw Hsa Eh. 2013. A Grammar of Kayan Lahta . Master’s thesis, Payap University.
- Shintani Tadahiko. 2014. The Zayein language. Linguistic survey of Tay cultural area (LSTCA) no. 102. Tokyo: Research Institute for Languages and Cultures of Asia and Africa (ILCAA).
