= Kayan people (Myanmar) =

Ethnic group in Southeast Asia

Kayan
ကယန်း
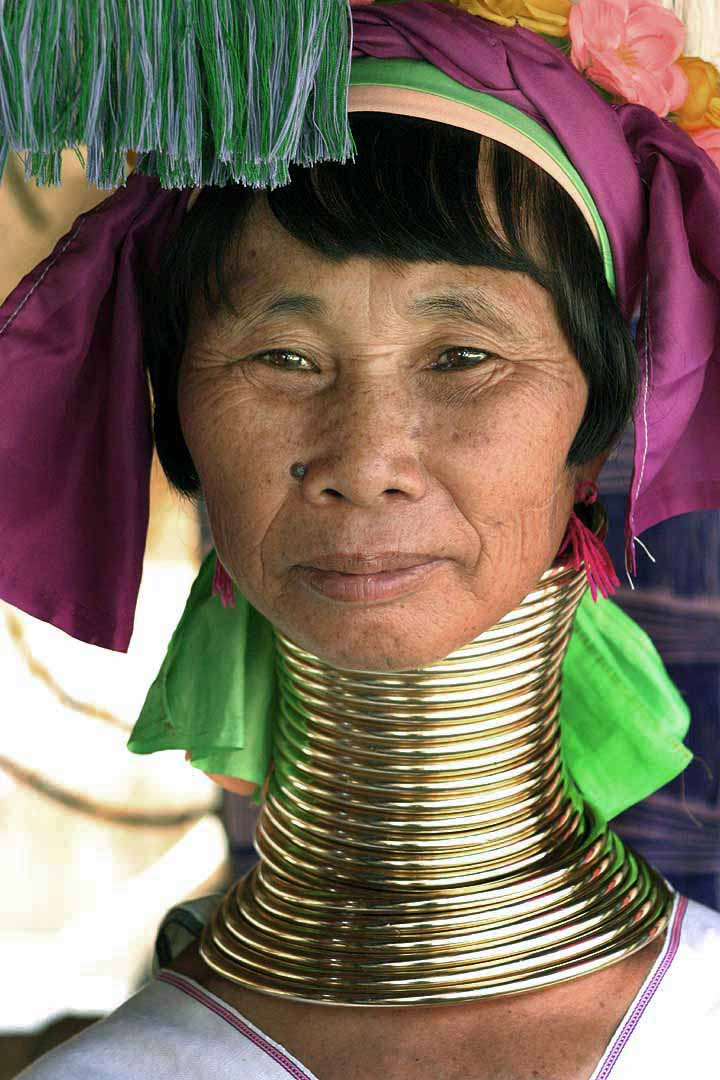
- A Kayan Lahwi woman

Total population
- 180,000

Regions with significant populations
- Myanmar; Thailand; Vietnam; U.S.
- Myanmar: Shan State: 90,000
- Myanmar: Kayah State: 70,000
- Myanmar: Kayin State: 12,000
- Thailand: 600
- United States: 600

Languages
- Padaung Kayan

Religion
- Kan Khwan

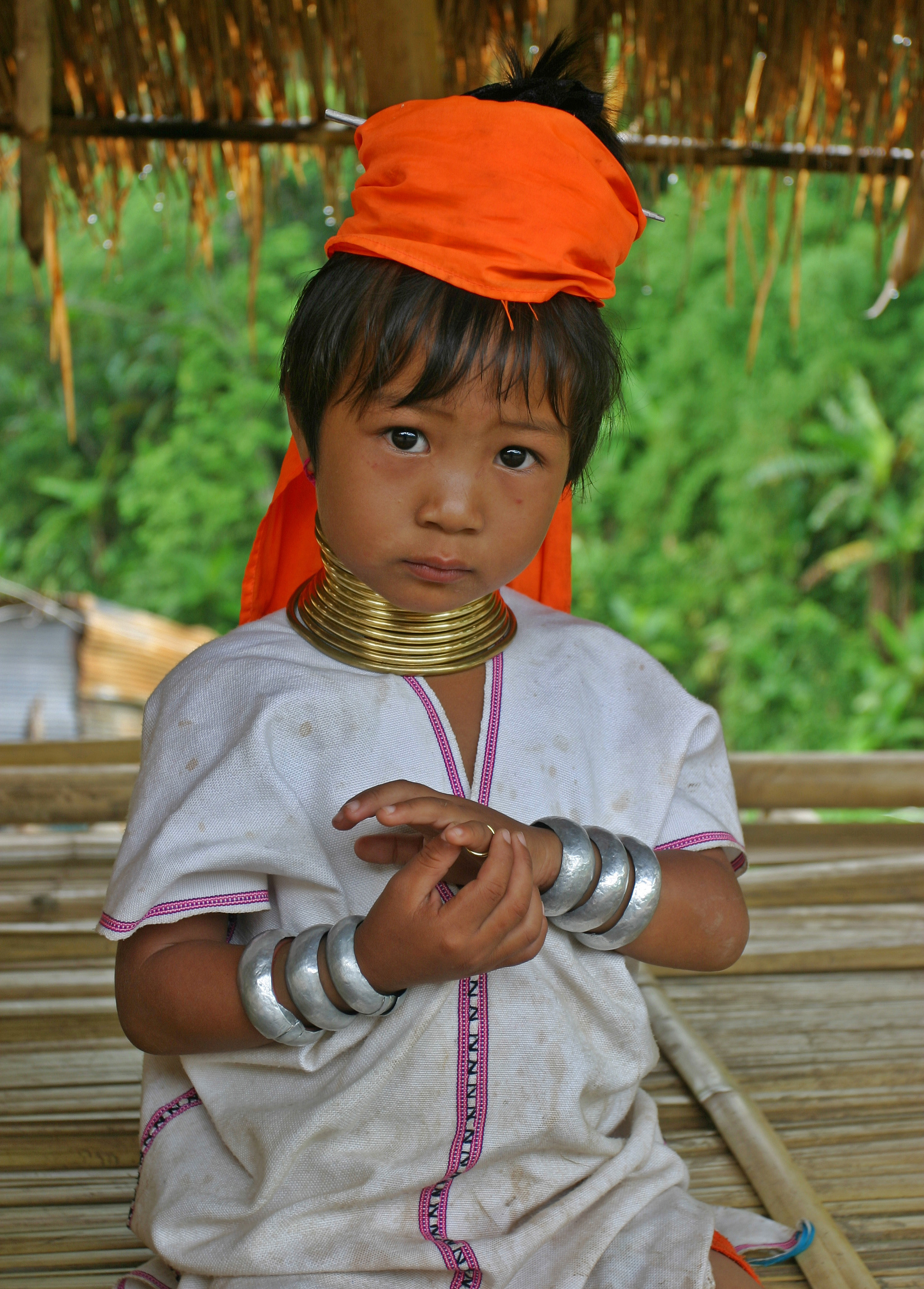
A Kayan Lahwi girl

The Kayan are a subgroup of the Red Karen (Karenni people), a Tibeto-Burman ethnic minority of Myanmar (Burma). The Kayan consists of the following groups: Kayan Lahwi (also called Padaung, ပဒေါင် [bədàʊɰ̃]), Kayan Ka Khaung (Gekho), Kayan Kadao, Kayan Lahta (Zayein people), Kayan Ka Ngan, Kayan Kakhi, and sometimes, Bwe people (Kayaw). They are distinct from and not to be confused with the Kayan people of Borneo.

Padaung (Yan Pa Doung) is a Shan term for the Kayan Lahwi (the group in which women wear brass neck rings). Kayan residents in Mae Hong Son province in northern Thailand refer to themselves as Kayan and object to being called Padaung, as corroborated by Khin Maung Nyunt in The Hardy Padaungs (1967). On the other hand, Pascal Khoo Thwe calls his people Padaung in his 2002 memoir, From the Land of Green Ghosts: A Burmese Odyssey.

In the late 1980s and early 1990s, due to conflict with the military regime in Myanmar, many Kayan tribespeople fled to Thai border areas. Among the refugee camps set up, there was a "long neck" section, which became a tourist site.

According to U Aung Roe (1999:21ss), the Kayan number about 90,000 in Shan State (around the Pekhon Township area), about 20,000 around Kayin State, and 70,000 in Kayah State (around Demawso and Loikaw). A 2004 estimate put the total population at approximately 180,000. About 600 Kayan reside in three villages open to tourists in Mae Hong Son, including the Ban Mai Nai Soi refugee camp.

== Settlement ==
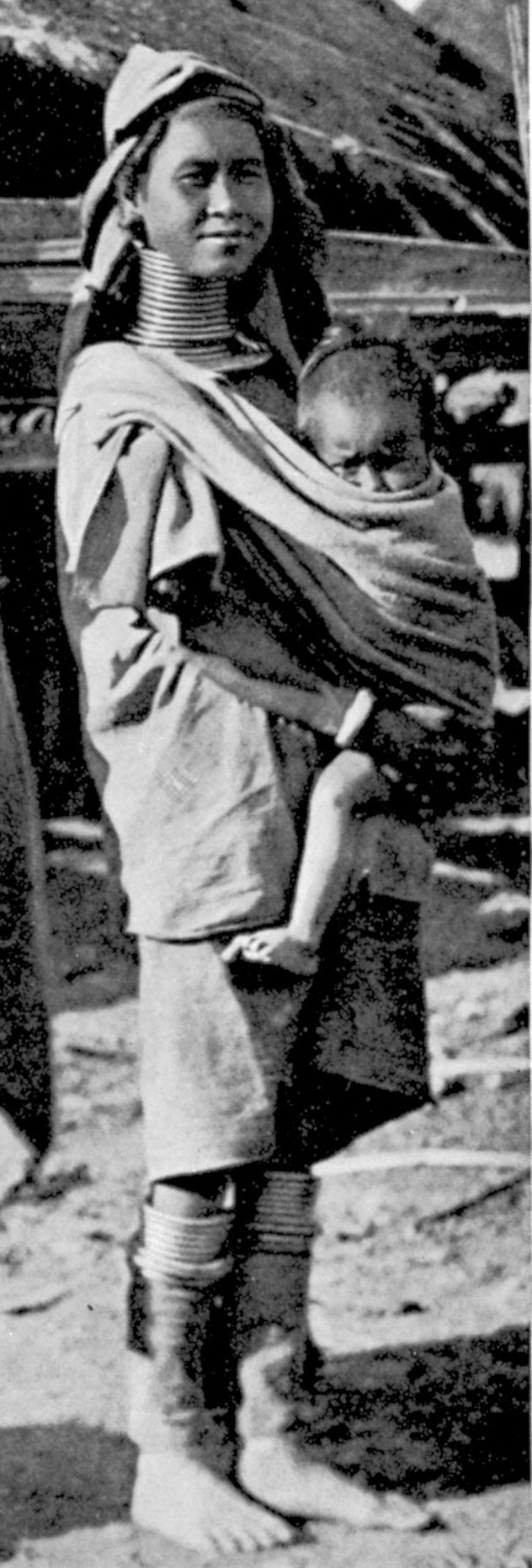
Woman and child, 1905

According to their oral history, the Kayan settled around Demawso in Kayah State in 739 AD. Today, they still reside there, in Loikaw, and Thandaung, as well as in the southern region of Shan State and in Pyinmana Township.

There are three Kayan villages in Mae Hong Son province of Thailand. The largest is Huay Pu Keng, close to the Thai–Myanmar border; Huai Seau Tao is a commercial village opened in 1995; and Nai Soi, many of whose residents moved into a refugee camp in September 2008.

== Culture ==
=== Brass coils ===
Women of the Kayan tribes identify themselves by their forms of dress. In the Kayan Lahwi tribe, females are known for wearing permanent jewellery in the form of neck rings, brass coils that are placed around the neck, causing it to lengthen.

Girls first start to wear rings when they are around five years old. Over the years, the coil is replaced by a longer one, and more turns are added. The weight of the brass pushes the collar bone down and compresses the rib cage. The rings can stretch necks to a length of about 15 inches (38 cm), pushing down the collarbone, compressing the rib cage, and pulling up about four thoracic vertebrae into the neck. Many theories regarding this practice have been suggested. Anthropologists have hypothesized that the rings protected women from becoming slaves, making them less attractive to other tribes. It has also been theorised that the coils originate from the desire to look more attractive by exaggerating sexual dimorphism, as women have more slender necks than men. Another idea is that the coils give women the appearance of a dragon, an important figure in Kayan folklore. The coils might be meant to protect from tiger bites, perhaps literally, but probably symbolically.

The coil, once on, is seldom removed, as the coiling and uncoiling is a lengthy procedure. It is usually only removed to be replaced by a new or longer coil. The muscles covered by the coil become weakened, and most Kayan women prefer to keep the rings once their clavicle has been lowered, as the area of the neck and collarbone often becomes bruised and discolored.

In 2006, some of the younger women in Mae Hong Son began removing their rings, either to give them the opportunity to continue their education or in protest against the exploitation of their culture and the restrictions that came with it.

The government of Myanmar began discouraging neck rings as it struggled to appear more modern to the developed world. Consequently, many women in Myanmar began breaking the tradition, though a few older women and some younger girls in remote villages continued to wear rings. In Thailand, the practice has gained popularity in recent years, because it draws tourists who bring revenue to the tribe and to local businesspeople who run the villages and collect entry fees.

In January 2008, the UNHCR expressed reservations about tourists visiting Kayan villages in northern Thailand due to the provincial government's refusal to allow registered Kayan refugees to take up offers of resettlement in developed countries. It is believed this policy was linked to their economic importance to the area. The policy was relaxed in late 2008, and a small group of Kayan left for New Zealand in August 2008.

=== Religion ===
Traditional

Kay Htoe Boe poles

Pwai dance

Following the pwai dance, the women sprinkle the men with water using Eugenia leaves.

Chicken bone prognostication

The Kayans' traditional religion is called Kan Khwan and has been practiced since the people migrated from Mongolia during the Bronze Age. It includes the belief that the Kayan people are the result of a union between a female dragon and a male human/angel hybrid.

The major Kayan religious festival is the three-day Kay Htoe Boe, which commemorates the belief that the creator god gave form to the world by planting a small post in the ground. During this festival, held in late March or early April, a Kay Htoe Boe pole is erected, and participants dance around it.

The Kayan have a strong belief in augury, and nothing is done without reference to some form of divination, including breaking thatch grass, but most importantly consulting chicken bones.

Cleansing ceremony rituals

Contemporary

As hilltribes, the Kayan can be categorised into different ethnicities and races, with various languages and religious beliefs. Traditional Kayaws believe in tree spirits, but younger generations are showing acceptance towards Buddhism and Christianity.

== See also ==
- Ndebele people of South Africa – an African tribe with a similar neck ring practice
- Pole worship
