= Huay Pu Keng =

Village in Mae Hong Son, Thailand

Coordinates: 19°14′12″N 97°53′38″E

Huay Pu Keng (Thai: ห้วยปูแกง; RTGS: Huai Pu Kaeng) is a village located in the Mae Hong Son province, in the northwest of Thailand. The village is inhabited by the Tai Yai, a Thai ethnic community and four subgroups of the Karenni people, namely the Kayan, Kayaw, Red Karen and Pakayor. The Kayan women in particular became famous because tourists began to find interest in their long necks with brass rings.

== Geography ==
=== Location ===
Huay Pu Keng is the largest Kayan village located in Mae Hong Son Province in northern Thailand, close to the Thai Myanmar border. This village is located in a remote hilly area along the Pai River, surrounded by dense rainforest. You can only reach the village by boat.

=== Climate ===
Northern Thailand is known for its milder weather with colder temperatures. During the months of November to February, the winter is mild and dry. Daytime temperatures are 27–32 °C (81–90 °F) with plenty of sunshine. Evenings are cooler and temperatures are 9–14 °C (48–57 °F). The dry season, from March to May, is identified by extremely dry and smoky air, which is caused primarily by annual agricultural and forest fires. With daytime and nighttime temperatures exceedingly high, many avoid traveling during this period.

June to October constitutes the rainy season, during which temperatures begin to cool off to around 29–31 °C (84–88 °F). Locals take a break from agricultural activities during this time period; some seek employment in other cities, while others engage in indoor produce activities. During the monsoon season, strong showers can occur several times daily and nightly. They are brief and do not last the entire day, and they are less intense and frequent in Mae Hong Son Province, where Huay Pu Keng is located. Located in Mae Hong Son town, also known as "The City of Three Mists", Huay Pu Keng experiences mist weather all year round. The reason why the town has received this name – "The City of Three Mists" – is because of the three causes of the mist: evaporating fog during the rainy season, dew in the winter, and smoke from field fires in summer.

== History ==
The Karenni ethnic group originated in Myanmar and now resides in the Huay Pu Keng area. Between the late 1980s and the early 1990s, this group sought sanctuary in Thailand, fleeing violence, forced labor, and instability. Together with other tribes, they were settled in refugee camps close to the Myanmar border. The Thai government noticed the unusual look of the women in these tribes and thought it would be a good idea to use them as a tourist attraction. They were given three different options: they could stay in the refugee camp (but not allowed to leave the camp), leave Thailand or move to villages open to tourism. Most of them transferred to small villages in Mae Hong Son province where tourists can visit them. However, Karenni people did not receive legal status in Thailand, which means they are not allowed to go to other parts of Thailand nowadays unless permitted by the government. At first, many travel organizations and tourists avoided these types of villages because it felt very unethical. Besides that, the tourists that did come to visit only came to take some pictures and leave again.

In 2008, this village was criticized by UNHCR as a "show village" where the local tribes performed a stereotypical role and where tourists only came to see Karenni people confined in a "human zoo". As tourism is still one of the important economic sources for Karenni people in Huay Pu Keng. they are looking for a sustainable way to present their unique culture in the same way they always have while also fostering meaningful encounters with visitors, namely through community-based tourism (CBT). Huay Pu Keng is the first and currently the only Karenni village in Thailand that made the transition towards community-based tourism.

== Culture ==
=== Brass coils ===
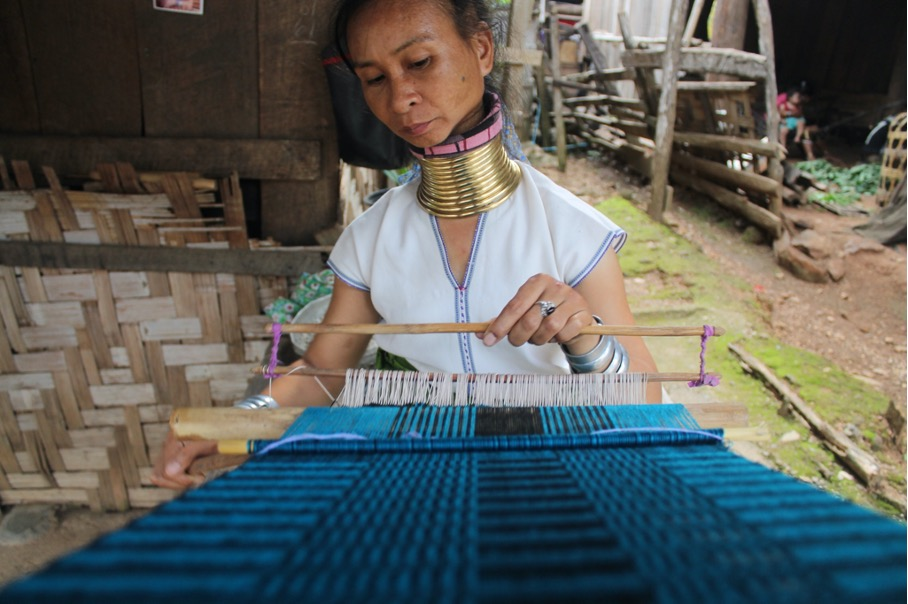
Ma Pang weaving a scarf in Huay Pu Keng

Women of Huay Pu Keng, like other Kayan tribes, wear neck rings, which are brass coils wrapped around the neck and appear to extend it. Around the age of five, girls start wearing coils around their necks. Some claims that brass colls are meant to protect the wearer from tiger bites, but this is a sensationalized lie. Kayan women wear brass coils to signify their distinct cultural identity and their beauty. As time passes, more and more coils are added to the neck, making it look incredibly long – but what most people don't realize is that the neck itself has not 'stretched'. The effect is caused by the coils pushing down on the collarbone and compressing the ribcage which gives the impression of a much longer neck.

=== Weaving ===
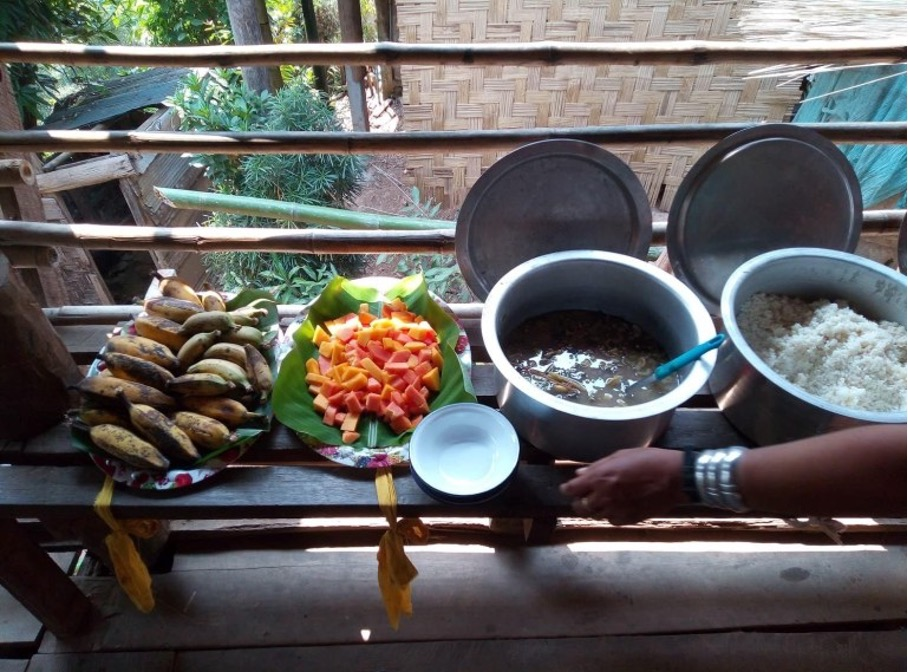
In Huay Pu Keng, visitors can try the local Kayan food or learn how to make some of the traditional dishes.

In the past, when they lived in Eastern Myanmar, the Karenni people maintained their way of life by living in the highlands and subsisting on farming. However, Karenni people left the place where they have lived for generations due to conflicts with the Myanmar government and migrated to Mae Hong Son. Many Karenni people reside in Thailand as unregistered refugees, with a string of politicized issues attached, including the absence of recognition of their indigenous culture. Weaving, being an integral component of Karenni culture, also seeks cultural autonomy and expects that its textile tradition does not become absorbed by Thai or Burmese textile cultures. This might explain the scarcity of literature on Karenni textiles as well as the difficulties in finding collections in local museums and organizations in Thailand. Visitors should go directly to the villages or street markets to discover Karenni textiles as an aspect of Karenni culture. Karen textiles and clothing exhibit a variety of distinctive characteristics, including their basic patterns, such as V-neck tunics and tube skirts; their traditional color palette, which includes red, black, and white (a designated color for unmarried women); and their textures, which include stitched seed adornments on thick cotton or hemp textiles.

=== Karenni cuisine ===
Food is an important part of Karen culture, serving as a source of solidarity for the community and an invaluable method of transmitting traditions to future generations. The Karenni rely on the surrounding jungle for sustenance, frequently trekking into the forest to pick bamboo shoots, mushrooms, and other naturally growing fruits and vegetables, as well as fish, prawns, crabs, and frogs from small streams. When it comes to cooking, the Karenni excel at incorporating a range of spices to enhance the flavor. Additionally, spices aid the Karenni people in maintaining their health; due to the local humid climate, the Karen people use spicy peppers to ward off body moisture. This cuisine shares some similarities with Burmese cuisine and makes use of lime juice as much as Laotian cuisine. In Northern Thailand, glutinous rice, not jasmine rice, is eaten as the staple food. Kayan Cuisine incorporates a range of unique ingredients, such as Matkhar pepper, which is similar to Sichuan peppercorns in that it has a slight numbing effect. It's used in a variety of recipes and is occasionally combined with chilies to give it a kick. Another ingredient popularly used in Kayan cuisine is Peh-boh, fermented dry soybean disks. It's also common in Shan dishes.

=== Kay Htoe Boe ===
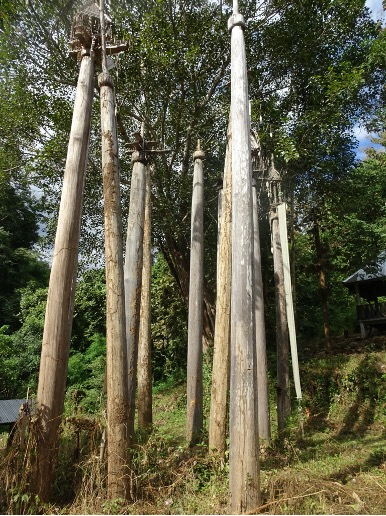
Kayen New Year Site in nearby forest

Kay Htoe Boe is the Karenni's most important annual religious festival, which is also celebrated in Huay Pu Keng.
