= Ceremonial pole =

Stake or post used in ritual practice

A ceremonial pole is a stake or post utilised or venerated as part of a ceremony or religious ritual. Ceremonial poles may symbolize a variety of concepts in different ceremonies and rituals practiced by a variety of cultures around the world.

In many cultures, ceremonial poles represent memorials and gravemarkers. In The Evolution of the Idea of God, Grant Allen notes that Samoyeds of Siberia, and Damara of South Africa plant stakes at the graves of ancestors. Ceremonial poles may also be raised during celebrations and festivals, as with Gudi Padwa in Indian State of Maharashtra and the maypole dance in Europe. In some cultures they may represent sacred trees or tools wielded by deities. They may also symbolise the axis mundi or world tree. In religious ceremonies, they may be venerated as idols or representations of tutelary deities.

== Africa ==
In the African diasporic religions such as Voodoo, a central pole may exist in a ritual space. In Haitian Vodou, ounfòs (temples) have pillars that hold up the roof. The central one is the poto mitan, and serves as an "axis" for ritual activity. Similarly, in Candomblé, a terreiro (temple) usually has a cumeeira, a central pole in the structure that serves as an axis mundi between the worlds of the humans and orixás. This stands above the entoto ("foundation") of the terreiro, a covered hole that is periodically "fed" with offerings.

== Asia ==
=== Middle East ===
==== Levant ====
An Asherah pole is a sacred tree or pole that stood near Canaanite religious locations to honor the Ugaritic mother-goddess Asherah, consort of El. (Note: A book-length scholarly treatment is Reed (1949); the connection of the pillar figurines with Asherah was made by Patai (1967).) The relation of the literary references to an asherah and archaeological finds of Judaean pillar-figurines has engendered a literature of debate. (Note: Summarized and sharply criticized in Kletter (1996); Kletter gives a catalogue of material remains but his conclusions were not well received in the scholarly press.)

The asherim were also cult objects related to the worship of the fertility goddess Asherah, the consort of either Ba'al or, as inscriptions from Kuntillet ‘Ajrud and Khirbet el-Qom attest, Yahweh, and thus objects of contention among competing cults. The insertion of "pole" begs the question by setting up unwarranted expectations for such a wooden object: "we are never told exactly what it was", observes John Day. Though there was certainly a movement against goddess-worship at the Jerusalem Temple in the time of King Josiah, it did not long survive his reign, as the following four kings "did what was evil in the eyes of Yahweh" (2 Kings 23:32, 37; 24:9, 19). Further exhortations came from Jeremiah. The traditional interpretation of the Biblical text is that the Israelites imported pagan elements such as the Asherah poles from the surrounding Canaanites. In light of archeological finds, however, modern scholars now theorize that the Israelite folk religion was Canaanite in its inception and always polytheistic, and it was the prophets and priests who denounced the Asherah poles who were the innovators; such theories inspire ongoing debate.

==== Mesopotamia ====
According to Zelia Nuttall in The Fundamental Principles Of Old and New World Civilizations, tree and pole reverence to Anu in ancient Babylonia-Assyria may have evolved from the fire drill and beam of the oil press, stating that it was extremely probable that the primitive employment of a fire-stick by the priesthood, for the production of "celestial fire," may have played an important role in causing the stick, and thence the pole and tree, to become the symbol of Anu.

=== Central Asia ===
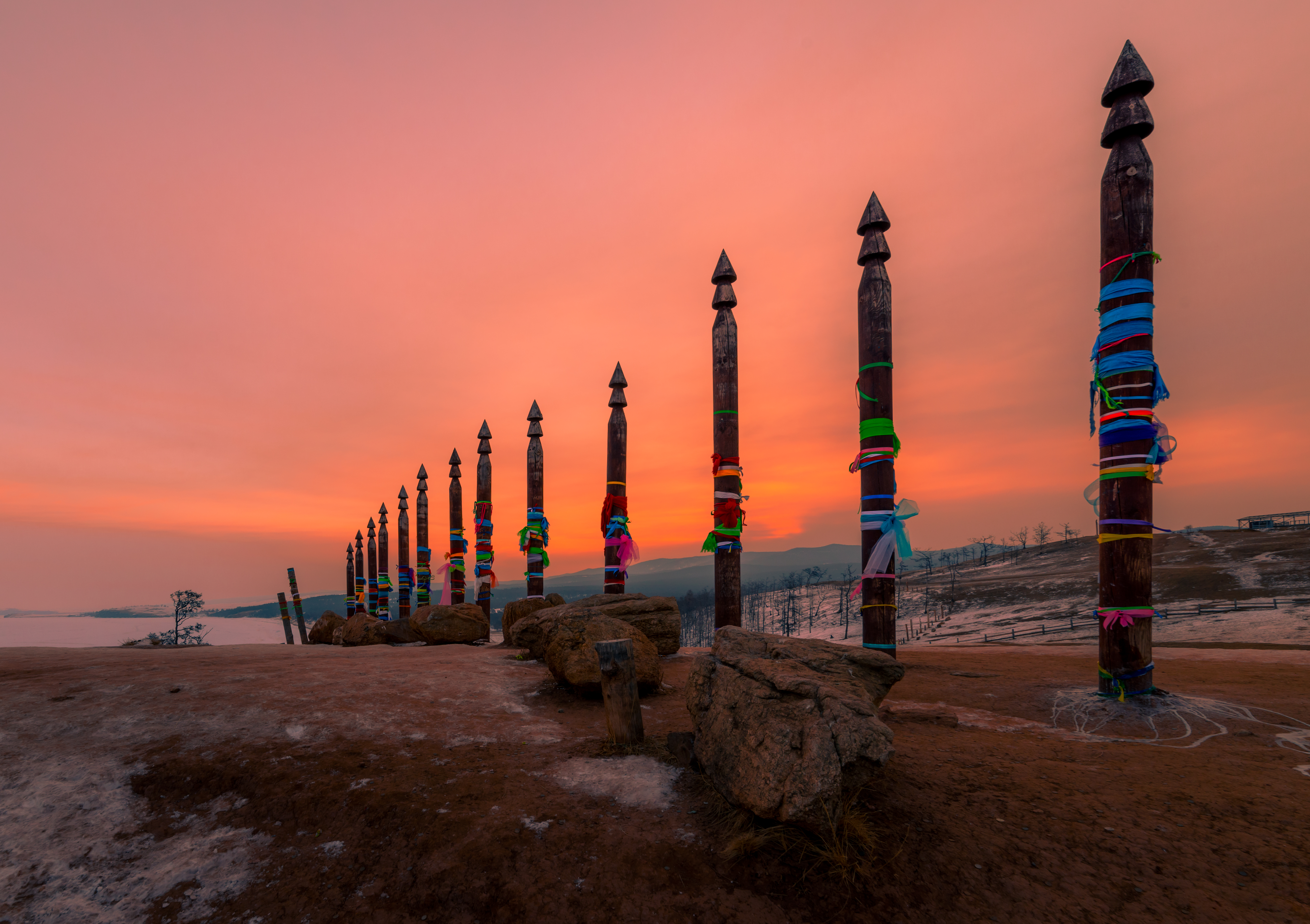
A series of serges at Shamanka on the Olkhon Island in Lake Baikal

The Buryats and Yakuts of Siberia place hitching posts called serge at the entrances to yurts or houses to indicate ownership and for shamanistic practices.

=== East Asia ===
==== China ====
The Miao people in southwestern China raise ceremonial "flower poles" (花杆) during the Huashan (花山) festival.

==== Korea ====
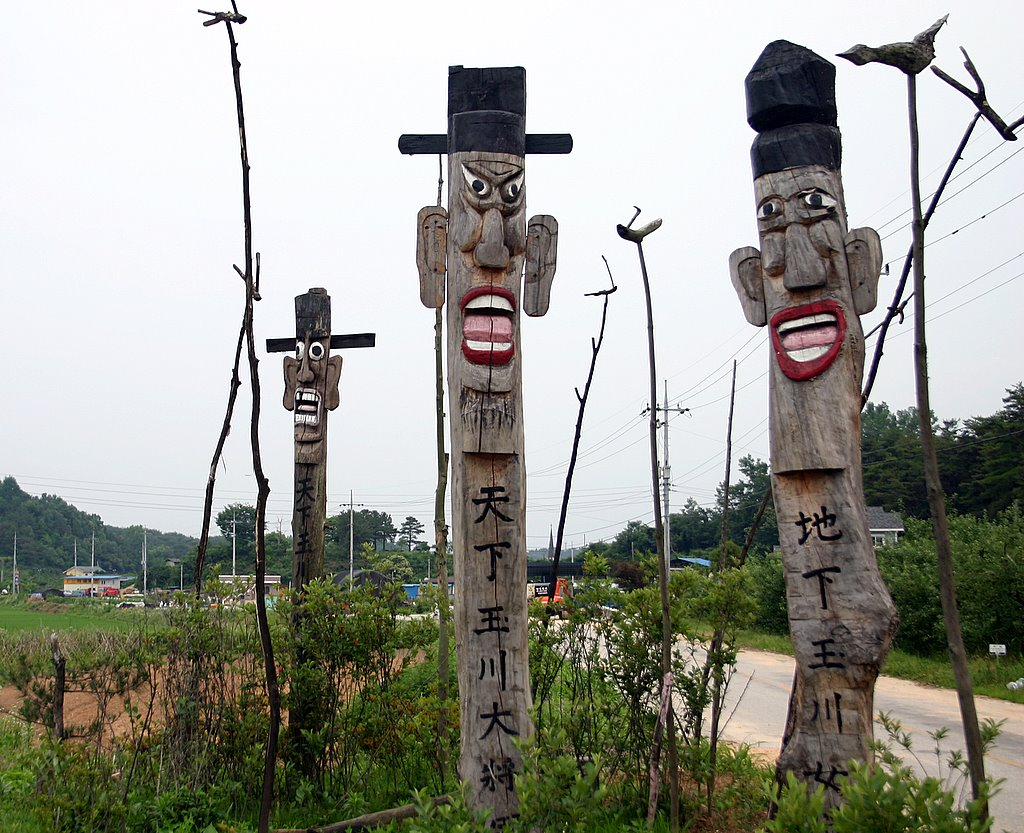
Jangseung and sotdae near Ongcheon-ri, Andong, Gyeongsangbuk-do, South Korea

A jangseung or "village guardian" is a Korean ceremonial pole, usually made of wood. Jangseungs were traditionally placed at the edges of villages to mark for village boundaries and frighten away demons. They were also worshipped as village tutelary deities.

=== South Asia ===
A gudhi pole in Maharashtra, India

Presently, in the Indian subcontinent, central poles are features of temple settings such as Hinglaj Mata (Sindh), Khambadev (Maharashtra), Nimad (Madhya Pradesh), Gogaji (Rajasthan), and Khambeshvari (Odisha). Ceremonial poles are also prominient in festivals, ceremonial dances, and celebrations such as Gudi Padwa, Kathi Kawadi, Jatara Kathi, and Nandi Dhwaja.

According to the Adi Parva, part of the Mahabharata, a bamboo festival named Shakrotsava was celebrated in the Chedi Kingdom. Uparichara Vasu was a king of Chedi belonging to the Puru dynasty, and he was known as the friend of Indra. During his reign, his kingdom introduced the Shakrotsava festival, which involved planting of a bamboo pole every year in honour of Indra, after which the king prayed for the expansion of his cities and kingdom. After erecting the pole, the celebrants decorated it with golden cloth, scents, garlands, and various ornaments.

=== Southeast Asia ===
==== Myanmar ====
Kay Htoe Boe is a Karenni ritual dance and prayer festival, held by the men in the Kayan community in Myanmar (Burma). In the Kayan creation story, the Eugenia tree is the first tree in the world. Kay Htoe Boe poles are usually made from the Eugenia tree.

Kay Htoe Boe poles have four levels, named for the stars, sun and moon, and the fourth level is a ladder made with a long white cotton cloth.

Throughout Myanmar, Buddhist monasteries and temples erect ceremonial poles known as tagundaing to celebrate the submission of nats (local animistic spirits) to Buddhist teachings.

== Europe ==
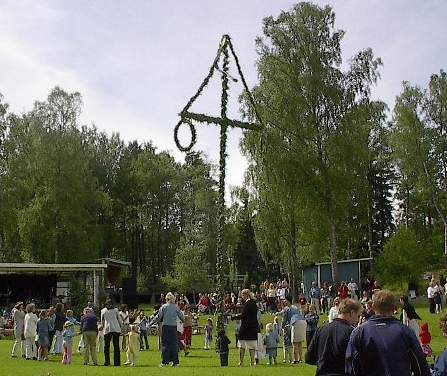
Dancing around the maypole, in Åmmeberg, Sweden

A maypole is a tall wooden pole erected as a part of various European folk festivals, around which a maypole dance often takes place.

The festivals may occur on May Day or Pentecost (Whitsun), although in some countries it is instead erected at Midsummer. In some cases the maypole is a permanent feature that is only utilised during the festival, although in other cases it is erected specifically for the purpose before being taken down again.

Primarily found within the nations of Germanic Europe and the neighbouring areas which they have influenced, its origins remain unknown. However, it has been speculated that it originally had some importance in the Germanic paganism of Iron Age and early Medieval cultures, and that the tradition survived Christianisation, albeit losing any original meaning that it had. It has been a recorded practice in many parts of Europe throughout the Medieval and Early Modern periods, although became less popular in the 18th and 19th centuries. Today, the tradition is still observed in some parts of Europe and among European communities in North America.

The fact that they were found primarily in areas of Germanic Europe, where, prior to Christianisation, Germanic paganism was followed in various forms, has led to speculation that the maypoles were in some way a continuation of a Germanic pagan tradition. One theory holds that they were a remnant of the Germanic reverence for sacred trees, as there is evidence for various sacred trees and wooden pillars that were venerated by the pagans across much of Germanic Europe, including Thor's Oak and the Irminsul. It is also known that, in Norse paganism, cosmological views held that the universe was a world tree, known as Yggdrasil.

The floor of the Mære Church, Norway, was excavated in 1969 and found to contain the remains of a pagan cult structure. The nature of that structure was not clear. Lidén felt this represented the remains of a building, but a critique by Olsen in the same work suggested this may have been a site for pole-related rituals. A recent review of the evidence by Walaker concluded that this site was similar to the site in Hove (Åsen, also in Nord-Trøndelag) and was therefore likely the site of a ceremonial pole.

== Romania ==
Ceramic vessels with quadruple images of pole goddesses represent a lunar fertility cult in the Precucuteni settlement of Baia–În Muchie (Suceava county, Romania), with some parallels.

== Oceania ==
In New Zealand Māori mythology, Rongo – the god of cultivated food, especially the kūmara (sweet potato), a vital food crop – is represented by a god stick called whakapakoko atua.

In the Cook Islands, Cult figures called staff-gods or atua rakau from Rarotonga, apparently combine images of gods with their human descendants. They range in length between 28 inches (71 cm) and 18 feet (5.5 m) and were carried and displayed horizontally.

== See also ==
- Asherah pole – Canaanite sacred tree or pole honouring goddess
- Baetyl – Type of sacred standing stone
- Bisj Pole – Type of Asmat ritual artefact
- Candle-pole – Slovenian festival item
- Cây nêu – Vietnamese New Year tree
- Festivus – Secular holiday celebrated December 23
- Inuksuk – Inuit built stone landmark or cairn
- Iron Age wooden cult figures – Overview of anthropomorphic stake gods
- Jangseung – Korean totem pole
- Kanrodai – Sacred pillar in Tenrikyo and its derived religions
- Matzevah – Sacred pillar (in the Bible) or Jewish headstone
- Maypole – Tall wooden pole erected as a part of various European folk festivals
- Menhir – Large upright standing stone
- Ovoo – Stone or wooden mounds used in Mongolian culture
- Peace pole – Monument series advocating for world peace
- Sacred grove – Grove of trees of special religious importance to a particular culture
- Shigir Idol – Oldest known wooden sculpture
- Stele – Stone or wooden slab erected as a marker
- Totem pole – Monumental carvings by Indigenous peoples of the Pacific Northwest
- Trees in mythology – Significance of trees in religion and folklore
- Xoanon – Archaic wooden cult image of Ancient Greece
