= Cipullo =

Cipullo is a surname. Notable people with the surname include:

- Aldo Cipullo (1935–1984), Italian-born American jewelry designer
- Tom Cipullo (born 1956), American composer
