= Permanent jewellery =

Jewellery worn for long continuous periods

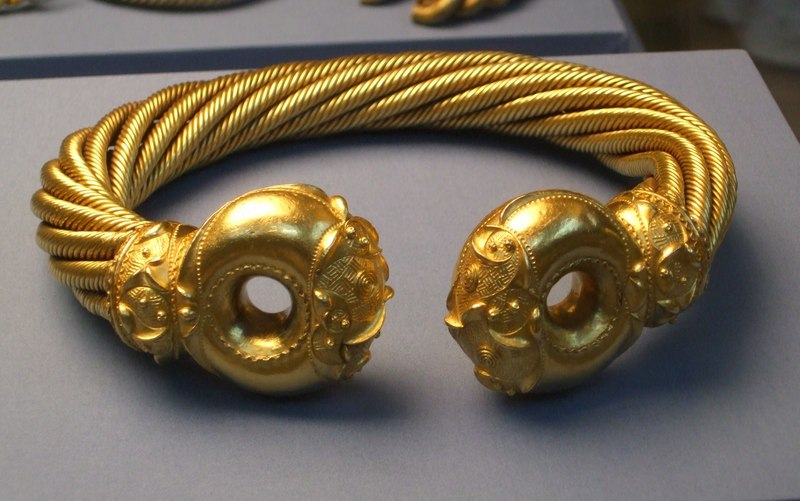
A torc, a type of solid necklace that must be forcibly bent to wear or take off. They were worn for long periods of time.

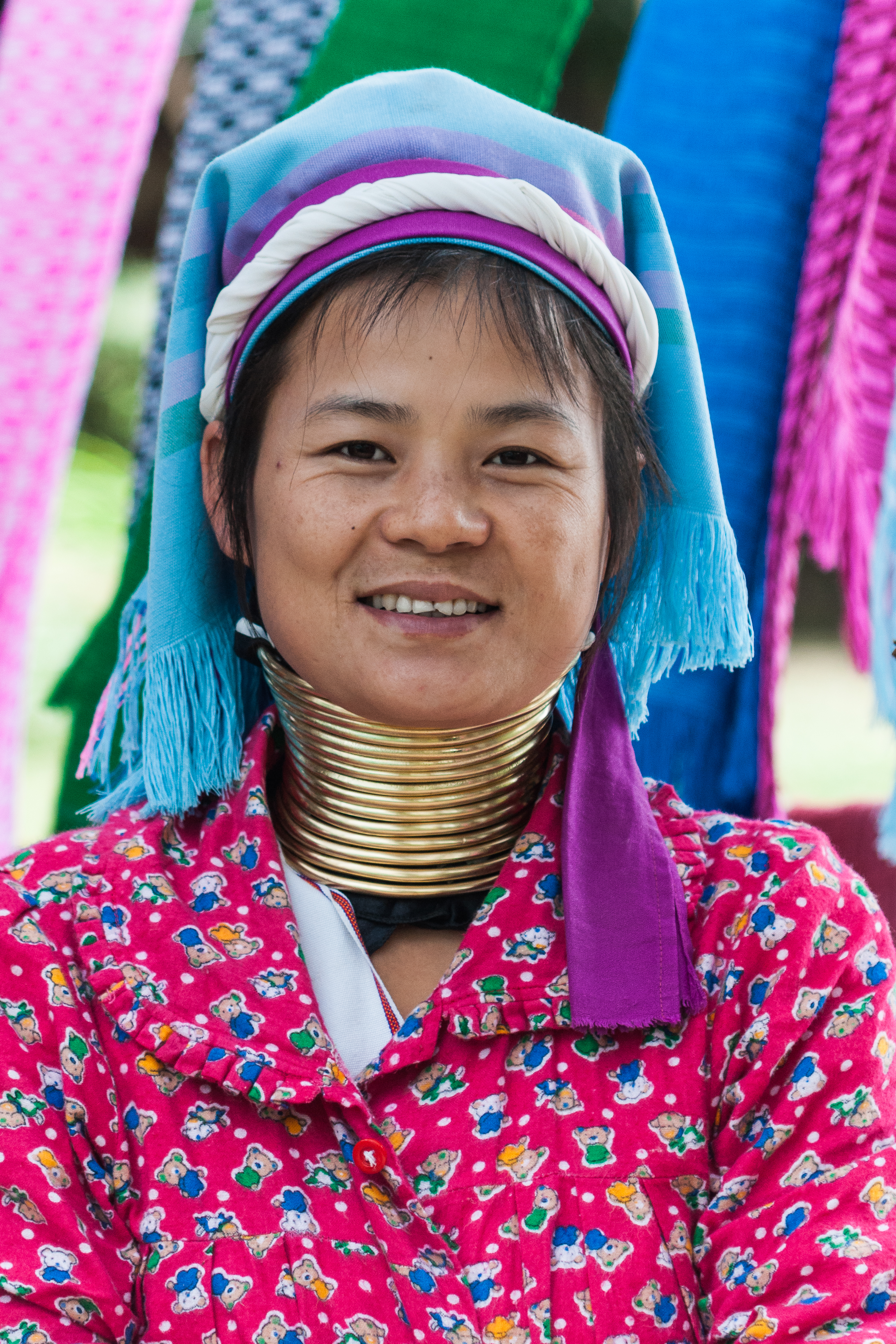
A Kayan woman wearing traditional neck rings

Permanent jewellery is a type of jewellery or adornment that is worn continuously for a significant period, and is designed to be difficult or impossible for the wearer to remove at will. Unlike piercings, which involve permanent or semi-permanent body modification and are removable but are often continuously worn, permanent jewellery is fitted around a body part so it is impossible to remove without being broken or unfastened with special tools. Permanent jewellery has held cultural, religious, and social meanings since at least the 11th century BCE.

== Indigenous cultures ==
A number of indigenous cultures include permanent jewellery in their practices. Examples include neck rings and anklets worn by the Kayan people, and torcs in various cultures. The brass rings of the Kayan people can be taken off but are usually only removed to add a new, longer coil to encourage stretching of the neck.

== Religion ==
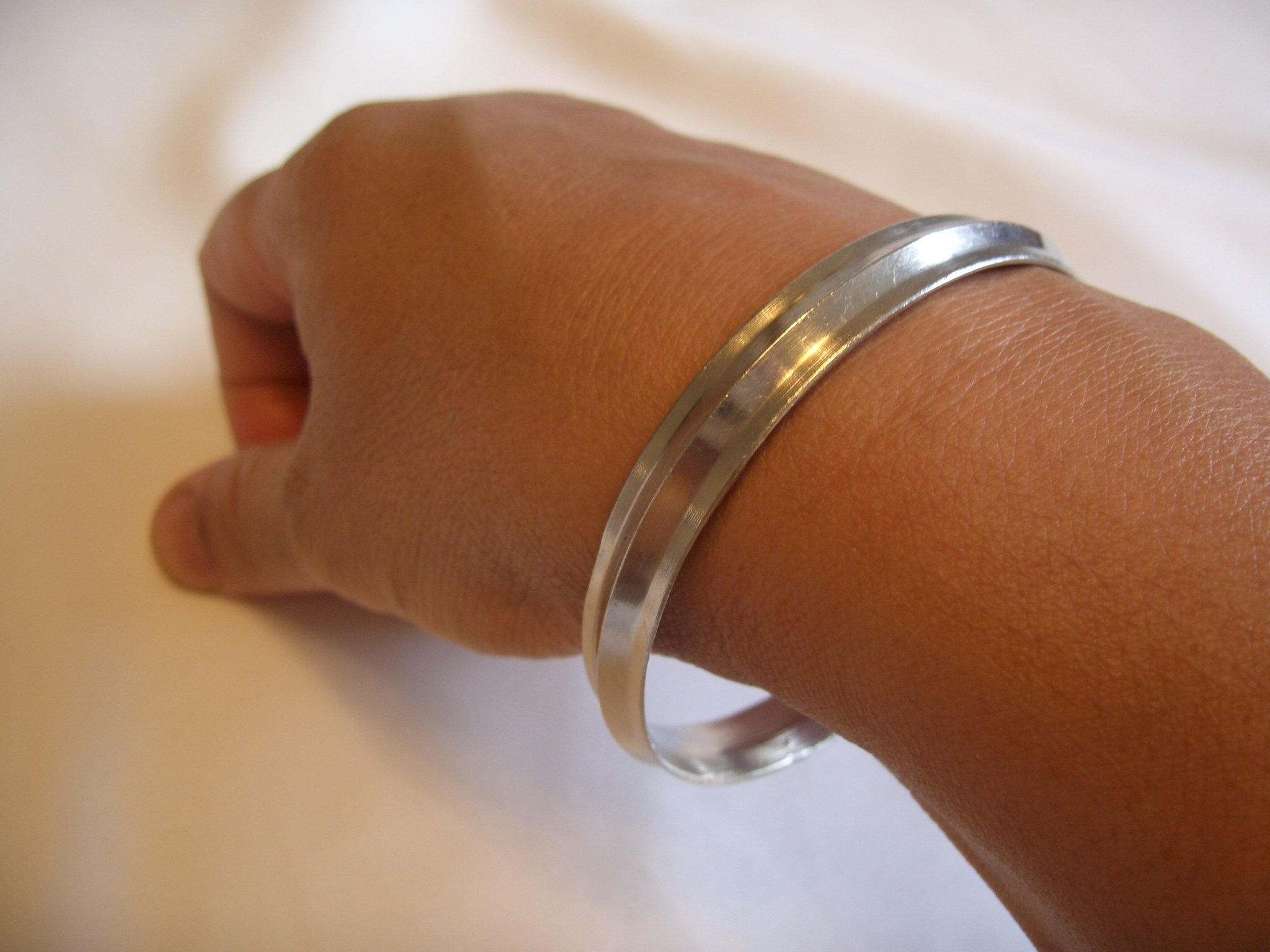
A kaṛā worn on the right arm

=== Sikhism ===
Khalsa (meaning "pure and sovereign") is the collective name given by Guru Gobind Singh, to those Sikhs who have been fully initiated by taking part in a ceremony called ammrit sañcār (nectar ceremony). During this ceremony, sweetened water is stirred with a double-edged sword while liturgical prayers are sung; it is offered to the initiating Sikh, who ritually drinks it. Many Sikhs are not formally and fully initiated, as they do not undergo this ceremony, but do adhere to some components of Sikhism and identify as Sikhs. The initiated Sikh, who is believed to be reborn, is referred to as Amritdhari or Khalsa Sikh, while those who are not initiated or baptised are referred to as Kesdhari or Sahajdhari Sikhs.

This ceremony first took place on Vaisakhi, which fell on 30 March 1699, at Anandpur Sahib, Punjab. On that occasion, Gobind Singh baptised the Pañj Piārē – the five beloved ones, who in turn baptised Guru Gobind Singh. To males who initiated, the last name Singh, meaning "lion", was given, while the last name Kaur, meaning "princess", was given to baptised Sikh females.

Baptised Sikhs wear five items, called the five Ks (in Punjabi known as pañj kakkē or pañj kakār), at all times. The five items are: kēs (uncut hair), kaṅghā (small wooden comb), kaṛā (circular steel or iron bracelet), kirpān (sword/dagger), and kacchera (special undergarment). The five Ks have both practical and symbolic purposes.

Removal of the kaṛā is permitted by religious writing but in practice, few remove the bracelet. Often, the bracelet is put on at a young age, and becomes difficult or impossible to remove as the wearer grows.

== Friendship, love, and marriage ==
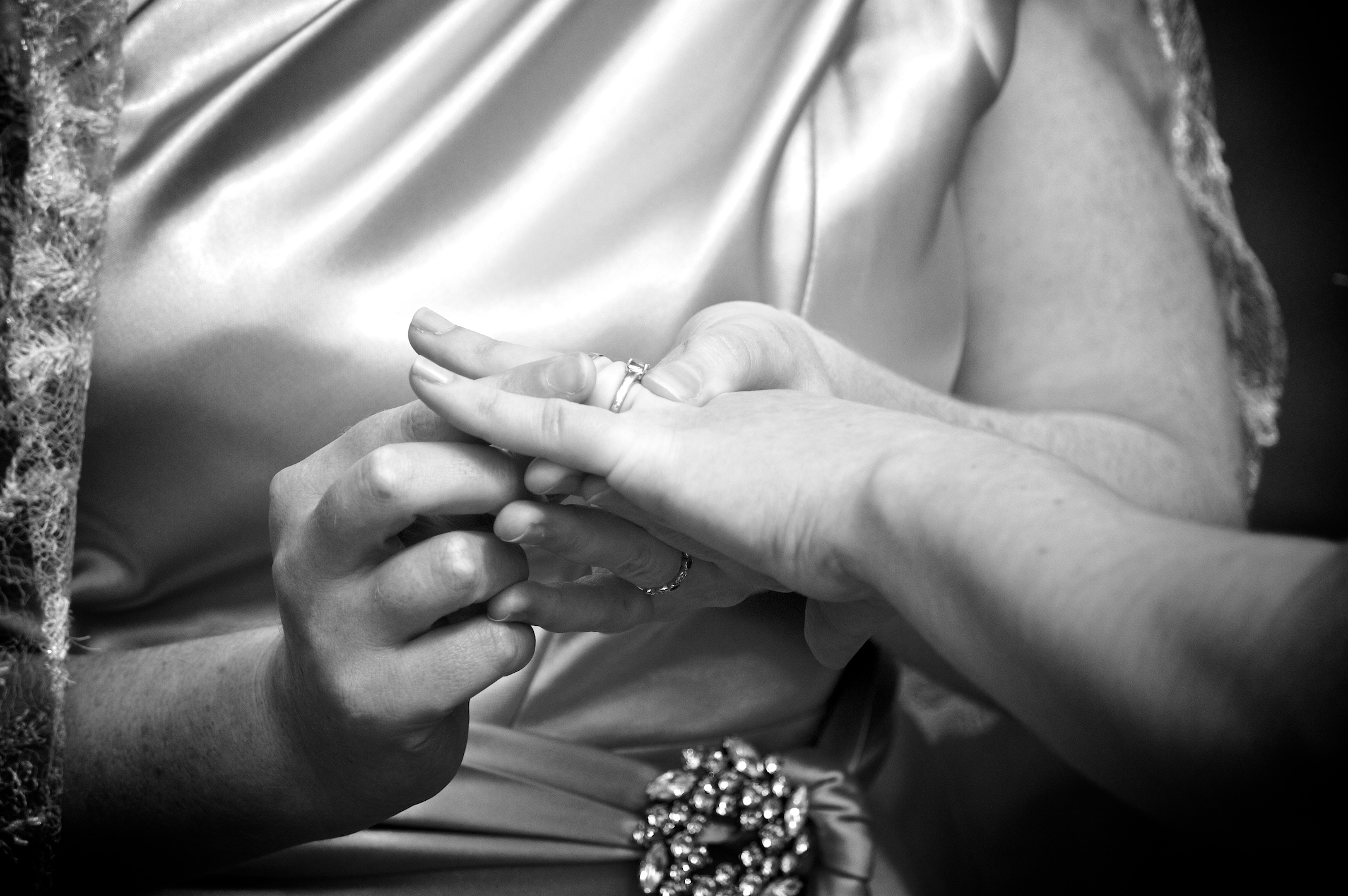
A woman places a wedding ring on her wife at a marriage ceremony.

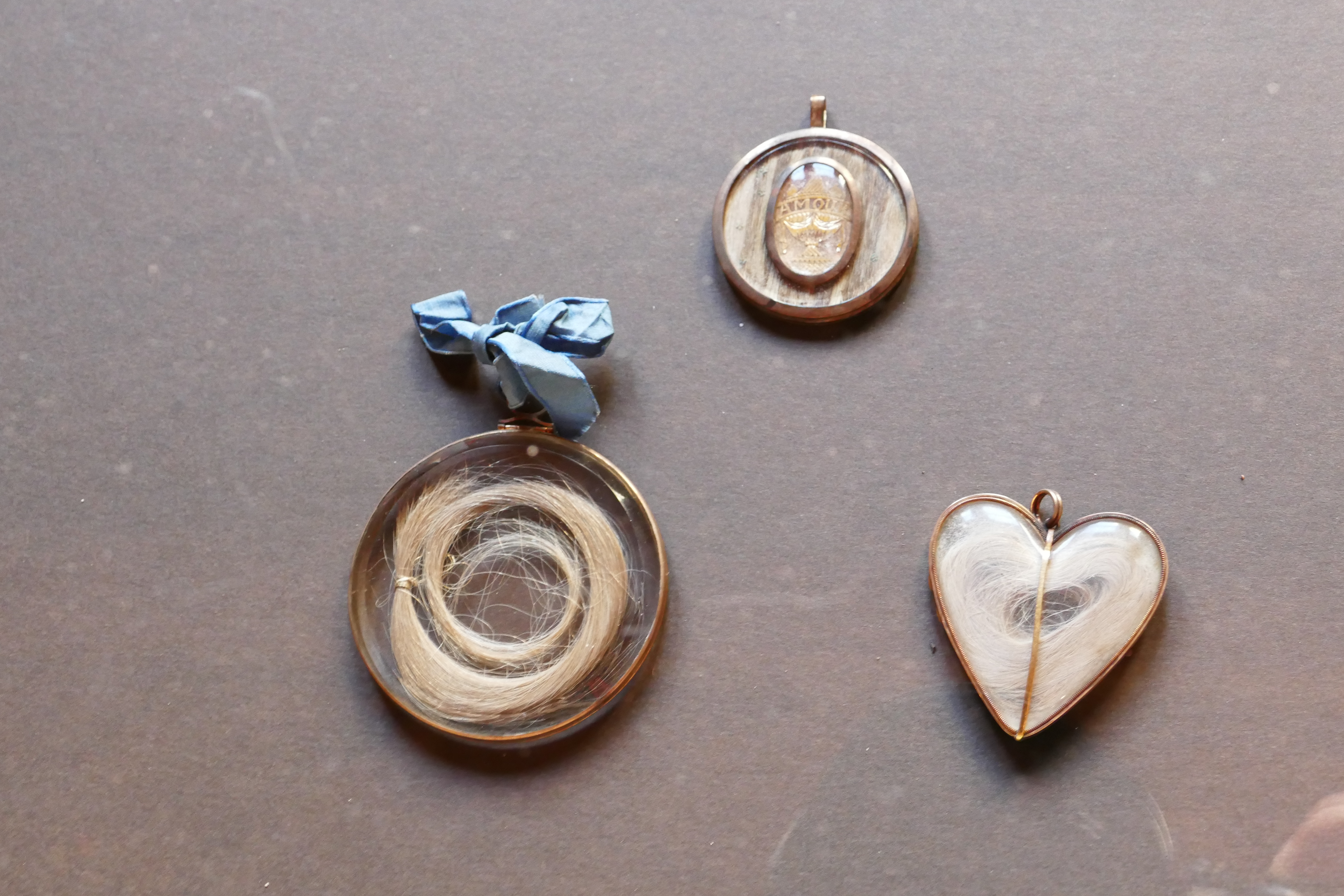
Three lockets, two containing the hair of a loved one. Lockets are usually placed on a necklace or sometimes a bracelet.

A common use of permanent jewellery is to show love to someone and as a reminder in their absence. Lockets and friendship bracelets are usually easily removed but continuous wearing is meaningful to some, and seen as a show of gratitude and connection.

In 1969, Aldo Cipullo created the love bracelet, which requires a special tool to open and close. Cipullo said: "What modern people want are love symbols that look semi-permanent – or, at least, require a trick to remove. After all, love symbols should suggest an everlasting quality." The removal tool, a screwdriver, is also available as a piece of jewellery to be worn by the person who gifted the bracelet.

Engagement rings and wedding rings are the most common forms of permanent jewellery. Most people rarely or never remove their wedding rings, and it is common to bury corpses with them still worn. Some types of engagement rings are designed to accompany or complete the wedding ring. The use of soft metals such as gold causes the rings to shape to the wearer over time, making them more comfortable to wear for longer periods and sometimes making them harder to remove.

Some items become considered permanent jewelry by the owner, even though removing them is trivial. A common example is continually wearing a deceased person's wristwatch to feel close to them.

== Slavery ==
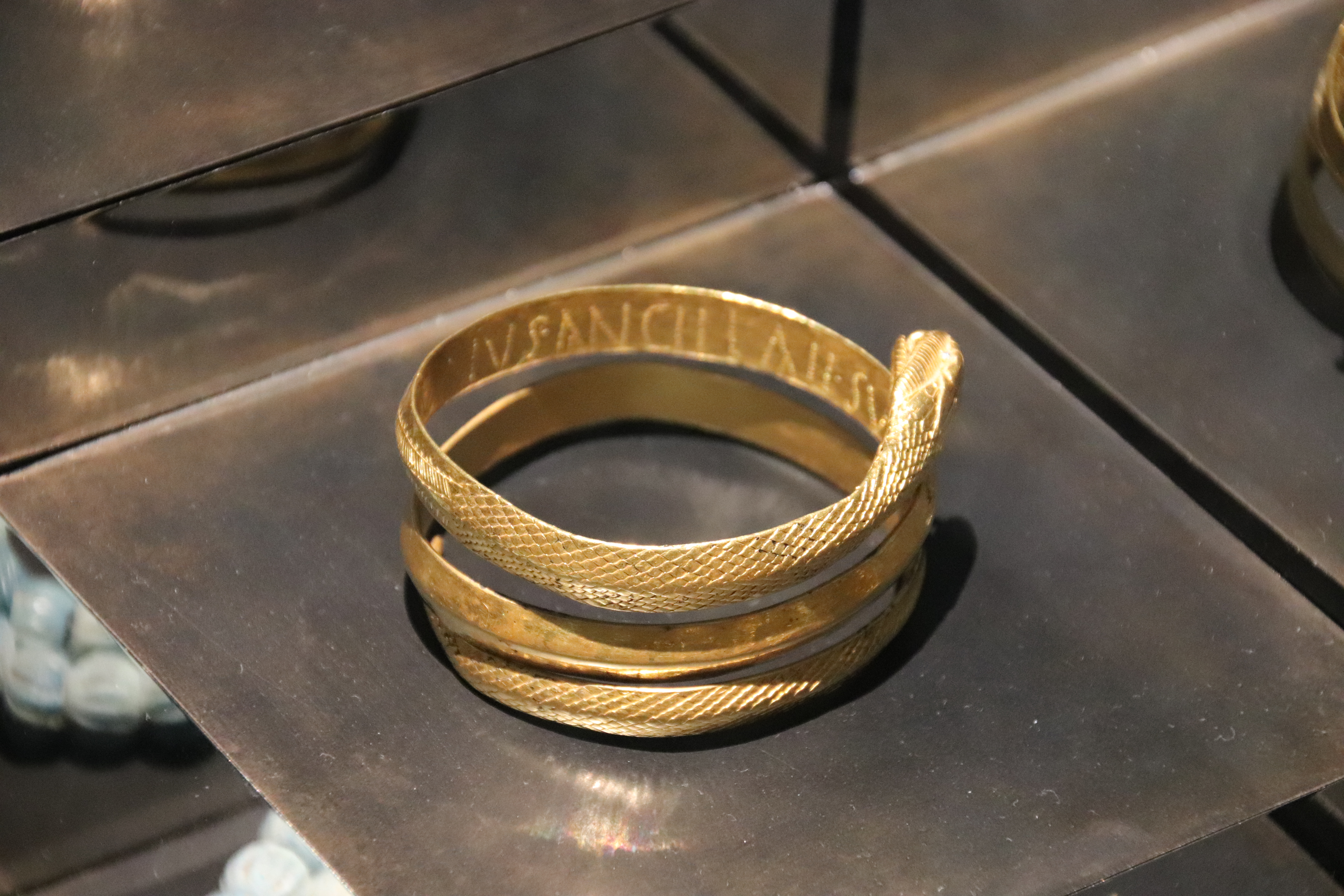
The Moregine bracelet inscribed "from the master to his very own slave girl" in Latin

The slaves and concubines of wealthy tyrants were sometimes forced to permanently wear affixed jewellery like metal collars and bangles. This is a luxury version of shackles, collars, chains, or cuffs that are typical with chattel slavery. These adornments identified the wearer as a slave, prevent their escape, and sometimes encourage their kidnapping and return to slavery. Many items of this type, including the Moregine bracelet, have been found by archaeologists.

== Modern trends ==
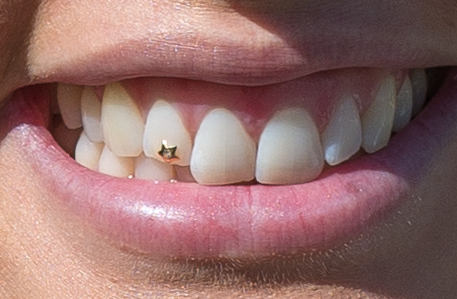
A smile adorned with a tooth gem of gold and gemstone

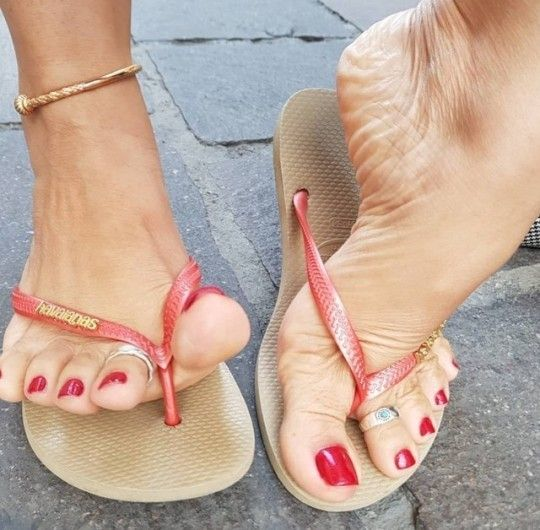
A lady wearing toe rings

Newer examples of permanent or semi-permanent jewellery include toe rings, medical bracelets, and dog tags. Some toe rings are shaped like a miniature open bangle, allowing the wearer to pinch it down to size for long-term wear.

Tooth gems are a semi-permanent jewellery that last months or years. Tooth gems are usually made of gemstones, precious metals, or titanium. Tooth gems are affixed to the tooth using chemicals.

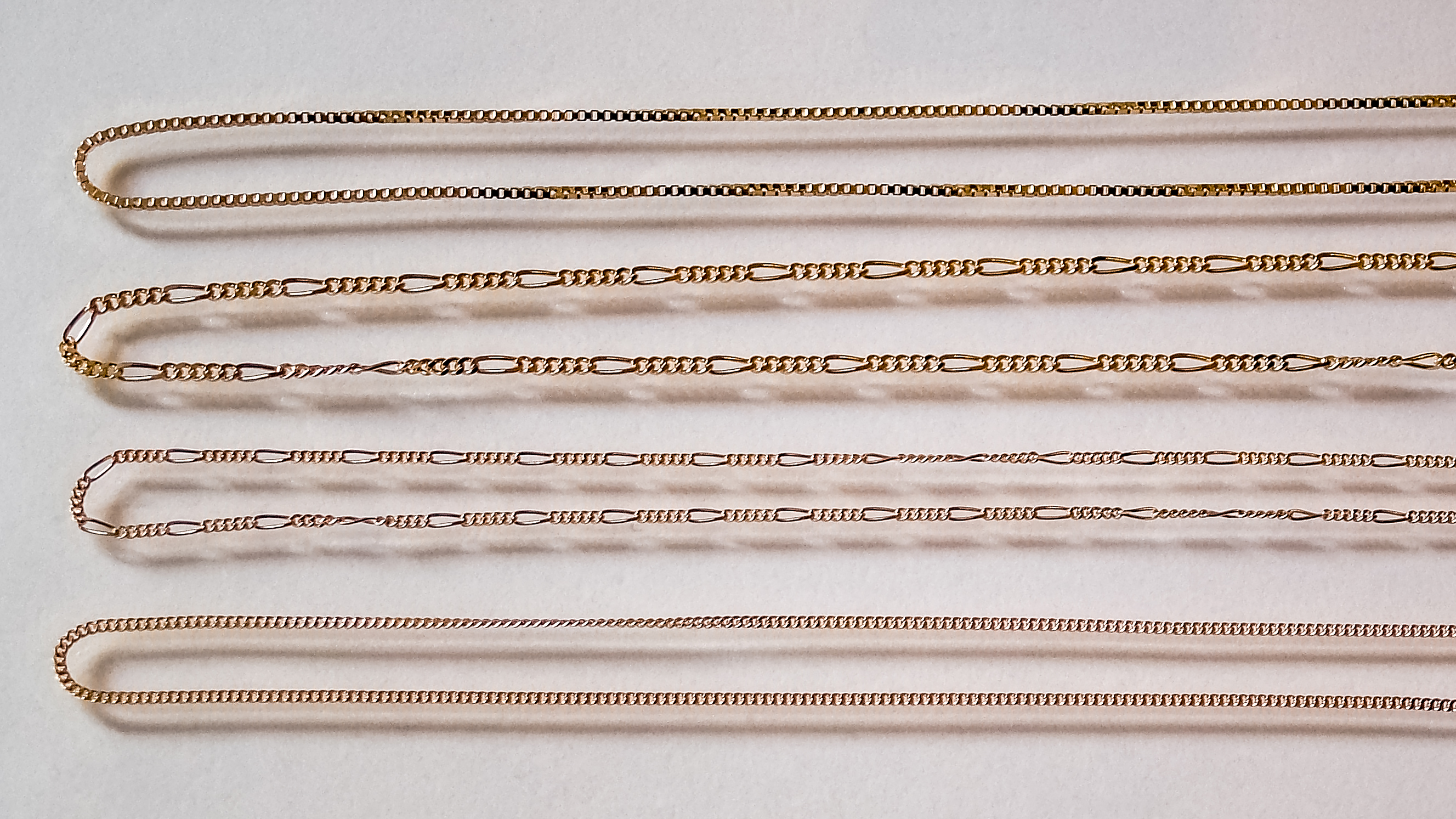
Thin gold chains, similar to the type used in 2020-chic permanent bracelets

In 2020, a viral trend of permanent chain bracelets took off. The thin, metal, chain lengths are cut close to wrist size then welded together on the wearer's arm, leaving no visible clasp. These bracelets can only be removed by breaking or cutting a link. The practice has existed since at least 2017.

== BDSM ==
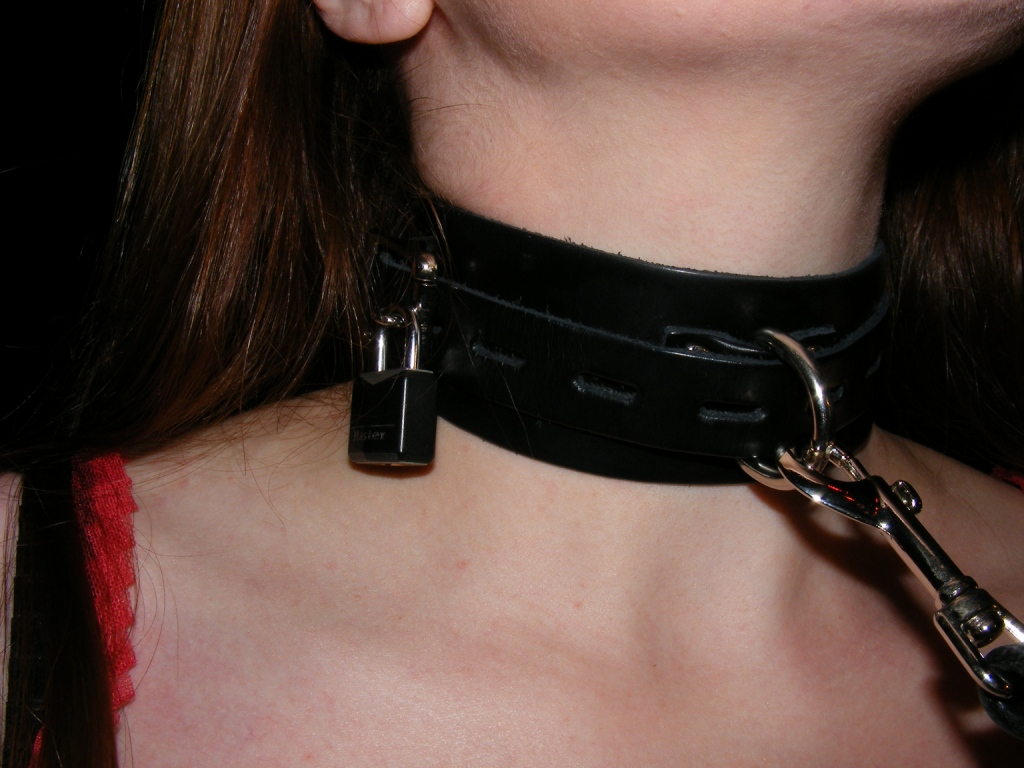
A BDSM collar with leash and lock

BDSM collars are often permanent jewellery made of leather, silicone, and metal. BDSM collars come with visible, heart-shaped locks or loops that are designed to fit a standard lock. "Collaring" someone is a kink ritual and often, regardless of the design, the wearer must ask the person who placed it to remove it. In situations where a BDSM collar might cause unwanted attention or discomfort, a "day collar" is often worn instead. Some day collars include subtle aspects of BDSM collars like metal O rings.

Some companies like Eternity make metal BDSM-focused collars and bracelets that can be bolted together. The simple shapes used emphasize the appearance of the jewellery as a singular piece.

Chastity belts and cages are another example of long-term kink wear. They are usually designed to be locking, tamper evident, or both. The person who owns the key is called the keyholder. Chastity belts and cages are usually designed to be as comfortable as possible, allowing the wearer to sleep, shower, and toilet themselves while wearing.

== See also ==
- Body modification
- Genital modification and mutilation
- Lip plates
