= Love bracelet (Cartier) =

Jewelry line

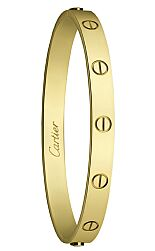
A recent edition of the Love bracelet (screwdriver not pictured).

The Love Bracelet (styled L⊝Ve, with the horizontal line inside the letter "O" alluding to the bracelet's locking mechanism) is a piece of jewelry designed in 1969 by Aldo Cipullo and later offered to Cartier SA. Early versions of the Love Bracelet featured gold plating, while more recent designs are created from solid gold or platinum. Prices for the bracelets differ depending on the item's materials. As of 2019, the Love Bracelet is still in production and Cartier has expanded the line to include products based on the original bracelet's design, including cufflinks, rings, earrings, necklaces, and watches. In 2006 the line was considered to be the "most successful collection in Cartier's history." The Love Bracelet can be considered a type of permanent jewellery.

In the 1990s, Cartier filed a lawsuit against multiple jewelry stores in Manhattan and Puerto Rico, alleging that the stores were selling counterfeit Love Bracelets.

== Locking mechanism ==
Unlike other more traditional bracelets, which are either wide enough to slip over the hand onto the wrist or can readily be opened in order to put them on, the Love bracelet is designed to be opened only by using a special screwdriver that is supplied with every bracelet. The screwdriver is also available in the form of a necklace, allowing the bracelet to be "locked" onto one person, while the "key" is kept around the neck of another, as a symbol for their commitment to their relationship.

== Variations ==
Cartier has offered the Love bracelet in 18k yellow gold, 18k "pink" (rose) gold, 18k white gold, and in platinum. Platinum has since been discontinued. Some bracelets are offered with diamonds in place of or in rotation with the screw-motif. Ceramic details and special colored precious gems have been offered as well. Pave diamond versions were made available in 2009. Cuff versions that do not close or lock are also available. More recently, a smaller "thin" version of the Love bracelet became available. The locking mechanism on the thin version involves a hinge and only a single screw. Thus, with the success of the thinner version, came the medium version as well, an in between of the classic and small Love bracelet.

In June 2006, Cartier introduced the Love charity bracelet, a version consisting of a silk cord and a golden ring bearing the word LOVE. Cartier donates $150 from the sale of each bracelet to a variety of charities, each backed by a celebrity. The 2009 version of the charity bracelet was promoted by actress Eva Mendes.

== See also ==
- Nomination bracelet
