= Tooth gem =

Gem glued on tooth for cosmetic reasons

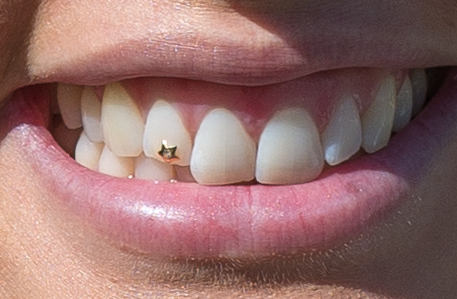
Tooth jewellery

A tooth gem is a gemstone glued onto the enamel of a person's tooth. It can be a single gemstone, or multiple arranged into shapes. They are semi-permanent, lasting from several months to several years. Over time the bond between the tooth and an improperly applied gem may weaken, creating a gap which cannot be cleaned, allowing bacteria to accumulate and can eventually lead to tooth decay. Tooth gems cannot be placed on veneers as they are too smooth.

== See also ==
- Grill (jewellery)
- Permanent jewellery
