= Nai Soi =

Village in Mae Hong Son, Thailand

Nai Soi (Thai: ในสอย), is a small village located in Mae Hong Son Province in northern Thailand. The village is under the administration of the Thai authorities. Nai Soi is about three kilometers from the Ban Mai Nai Soi Karenni refugee camp. Nai Soi is about 20 kilometers from the town of Mae Hong Son, along a paved road accessible year-round. It is perhaps most well known for the refugee camp found there and for having the largest Karenni settlement of the three villages. Thai authorities view Ban Mai Nai Soi as a self-sustaining refugee camp.

== Demographics ==
Nai Soi has a population of 1,800 people and roughly 375 households. 50% of the ethnicity belongs to the Shan group and 50% belong to the Karen minority group. In addition, there are 6 Chinese Haw households and 15 local Thai households. The predominant religions in Nai Soi are Buddhism and Christianity.

== Town ==
=== Education ===
There is only one primary school and one secondary school in the entire village. 380 students are enrolled in the primary school. The majority of students are female. Out of the 380 students, 20 students are from Ban Doi Saeng. There are 30 students enrolled in grades 10-12 in studying in the Mae Hong Son town. Nai Soi also has a learning center that provides high school education to children living in Nai Soi and in the general area of the Mae Hong Son Province. The Ban Nai Soi Community Learning Center (BNSCLC) is intended to provide a high school education, practical vocational skills, and community development skills to high school aged children. However, this center only enrolls students not part of the refugee camps. Although there are no school fees, the parents and students involved are expected to contribute to the planting, cultivation, building and maintenance of the school and crops.

=== Economy ===
Nai Soi is the most affluent community compared to the other villages in terms of living standards and economy. 29 families have an annual income of less than 20,000 baht. The rest of the families could earn up to 100,000 per year. The average wage for female laborers rang from 50-60 baht, whereas the male laborers earn between 60-70 baht. Most of the people grow highland rice, chili, soybean, and garlic as their main crops. The agricultural practices among the Karen communities are based on traditional methods of rotation cultivation that depend on rainfall. The main staple food for Nai Soi is rice. Work time is usually between 8am and 4pm with a one-hour lunch break. Work specific to women laborers include growing paddy and clearing weeds. Men specifically work on tying and carrying garlic. Both men and women harvest rice and garlic.

In 2006, villagers could sell fresh garlic for 10-15 baht per kg.

The time schedule for the transportation of goods of each month is as follows: 10th-15th: rice; 15th-18th: Chili, salt, charcoal and beans; 15th-not beyond 22nd: Charcoal, cooking oil, and chili.

The village currently has 600 motorcycles and 38 pick-ups. There are 2 big grocery stores along with 13 smaller grocery stores, 5 noodle shops, 1 rice and curry shop, 1 beauty salon, 1 motorcycle repair shop, and 2 barbers.

=== Support from the Thai government and NGOs ===
Nai Soi villagers receive training on soybean processing from the rapid Rural Development Office and on organic fertilizer from the Agricultural Extension Office. In addition, The Tambon Administrative Organization provides blankets for poor families as well as vaccination for cats and dogs.

Currently, the International Rescue Committee provides water pumps and sport equipment for the village.

=== Relations with the refugee camp ===
Many of the villagers have relatives in the refugee camp. Moreover, there are also cases of inter-marriage among the refugees and villagers. The refugee camp also serves as a source of seasonal laborer for the villagers’ fields. However, usually these seasonal laborers are hired illegally. Furthermore, the camp offers pick-up drivers a source of income by requiring their services for transportation of goods to the camp.

Despite these benefits, the villagers and refugees do compete with each other in terms of raw resources and growing crops. Since, refugees and villagers share the same indigenous traditions of the forest, they compete with one another in collecting wild honey, animals, bamboo shoots, fish, crabs, etc. Specifically, bamboo depletion is a problem due to the refugees cutting them down to make bamboo panel. These bamboo panels are then transported out of the refugee camp to be sold in Chiang Mai every two months.

=== General problems ===
Due to flooding that occurs every year, Nai Soi is in desperate need of road repair. Moreover, Nai Soi lacks a comprehensive highland waterworks system and thus has an inadequate supply of water. At present, water is only released two times a day: between 5am and 11am and between 3:00pm and 8:00pm. There is also an inadequate amount of blankets and sweaters for the elders of the village and for 57 poor families.

=== Recommendations by the UNHCR ===
The UNHCR recommended:

1. The Thai Burma border consortium should buy soybeans and vegetables from the villagers to increase economic conditions.
2. There should be a system in the camp to monitor the coming and going of seasonal laborers.
3. Refugee who are minors should be accompanied by adults to prevent them from stealing.

== Refugee camp ==
Camp: Ban Mai Nai Soi (BMN) - 3 km west of Nai Soi.

In 1992, the first official Karenni refugee camps were established in the Mae Hong Son province. Out of the four camps found in the Mae Hong Son province, the Ban Mai Nai Soi (BMN) camp is the largest with almost 20,000 residents. Most of its inhabitants are from the Karen and Karenni ethnic minority groups fleeing from Myanmar. These people fled Myanmar as a result of instability and human rights violations. However, Thailand’s Ministry of Interior defines the status of these people as “displaced persons fleeing fighting” and thus views them as having illegally entered the country. As such, those who leave the camps are subject to arrest and charge for illegal entry.

Since the Royal Thai Government does not recognize the people living in these temporary shelters as refugees, their rights as refugees are not fully protected. For instance, the right to most favorable treatment in terms of engaging in wage-earning employment and programs as labor recruitment is denied to them.

=== General Population ===
There are 5,030 households in the camp with 9,452 females and 10,026 males. Half of the refugees are children and adolescents. Most of these children were born inside the camp and have never experienced life outside of the refugee camp. Children usually grow up in confined conditions that seriously impact the development of their skills, talents, and vision. The parents must struggle to earn extra money to buy enough meat, vegetables and fruit for their families. Although monthly rations are distributed, these are often not enough for a family to survive on. Parents also struggle to buy clothes for their children and to pay school fees. School fees can range from 25-50 baht per student and is collected by schoolteachers to be spent on school administration costs.

=== Living Conditions ===
Electricity generated by solar panels and mini-hydro generators are only available to the hospitals and Ministry of Thailand offices. Refugees who can afford it also have access to electricity.

Basic health care facilities are available within the camp. Refugees also have access to free medical services in the camp and are transferred by camp clinics to district hospitals for serious illnesses. As of 2004, the United States' Centers for Disease Control and Prevention has designated BMN as in a post-emergency phase. This means the camp has less than 1 death per 10,000 persons per day and basic needs (such as food, shelter, water and sanitation) have been met. In addition, the mortality rate for 2004 was 4.2 per 1000/year.

=== Education ===
Basic education is available within the camp as well as various vocational training and Thai language courses. There are 1,627 children enrolled in nursery school, 3,432 in primary education, 2,046 in secondary education, 382 in high school education, and 143 enrolled in post-Grade 10 or teacher training programs, making it a total of 7,630 students. Most graduates of post-Grade 10 educations are getting jobs by replacing the refugees who have been offered resettlement in another country. These jobs are in the areas of education, health and sanitation services.

=== Labor ===
Males are more likely to leave the camp than females for the purpose of cash income. Separated children aged 15–18 generally went outside of camp during school break to find work. They usually go to places nearby such as the village Nai Soi, Mae Hong Son town or other Thai villages near the camp and the jungle surrounding the camp. The majority of refugees work in agriculture (94%) and earn roughly 41-60 baht per day. Males often receive 60 baht a day in agriculture work while females receive 50 baht for the same work. Only three percent stated of refugees stated that they had worked in construction. Approximately nine percent indicated they worked in a variety of other fields such as tourism, chicken factory and work for civil and political groups.

The number of seasonal laborers supplied by the camp range from 2,500 to 4,000 people. However, the real figure is almost certainly higher as refugees are aware that it is illegal to leave the camp and are hesitant to report their departures. Research conducted by Friends of the Earth in 2001 and by UNHCR in 2007 both showed that the refugees earned around 50 baht per day. This means that the wage given to refugees has remained almost the same for at least six years.

In regards to treatment of refugees who work outside of the camp, the UNHCR found: "55% of the people who left the camp to work had been exploited in at least one way: including mistreatment by employers (19%), being underpaid by the employers (12%), and not being paid at all by an employer (12%). Many people reported that they were exploited by their employer in more than one way. In addition, 80 percent of the total number of non-Karen people who work outside of the camp had faced labor exploitation."

=== Mental health ===
In 2001, the Centers for Disease Control and Prevention assessed the mental health conditions of Karenni refugees residing in the Mae Hong Son refugee camps. The purpose of the assessment was “to determine the prevalence of mental illness, identify risk factors, and develop a cultural appropriate intervention program.” 317 households were surveyed with a ratio of 1.1:1 of male-to-female.

The results of the survey found that 27% of respondents described the quality of life as miserable or very miserable with 60% describing it as neither pleasant nor unpleasant. 94% of respondents were also found to be unemployed or had no regular income. The most common trauma events experienced during the past 10 years were hiding in the jungle (70%), forced relocation (67%), lost property (66%), and destruction of houses and crops (48%). In addition, 3% of women and 3% of men reported having been raped. Of the respondents, 41% reported suffering from depression, 42% from anxiety, and 4.6% from PTSD.

The study also revealed several psychosocial risk factors, many of which can be modified by changes in refugee policy in the Karenni camps. For instance, the micronutrient content of food rations, in combination with the policy to forbid movement, employment, and cultivation of land outside of the camp negatively impact the social functioning and mental health of the Karenni refugees.

=== Kayan people and tourism ===
Nai Soi is also home to a large population of the Kayan people inside Thailand. In the last 20 years, the Kayan population has grown to 520. The Kayan people are a sub-group of the Karenni minority in Burma. The Kayan women are famous for wearing brass rings around their necks, giving the illusion of an elongated neck. However, not all Kayan women wear the rings.

As of February, 2017: There was only one "long-necked" woman and one tourist stand in the Ban Nai Soi Kayan Long-necked Village, which is located next to the entrance to the Ban Mai Nai Soi refugee camp, 3 km from Nai Soi on a dirt road in very poor condition. The sign at the entrance to Ban Nai Soi says entry is free, and that there are 20 families and 104 residents, although the sign appears to be several years old. The village contains a school, health clinic, and Christian church. No long-necked women live in the town of Nai Soi itself.

=== Refugee Status ===
In 2005, the United Nations High Commissioner for Refugees opened registration for all 50,000 refugees in the area. Almost every Kayan family applied and two were approved for New Zealand and one for Finland. However, the Thai government has defined the Kayans as “a hill tribe” and thus has denied these people the right to seek asylum. The Royal Thai Government states that refugee status only applies to “someone living in the refugee camp and who was a war refugee.” As a result, the Kayan people are not allowed to leave their largely sealed-off refugee camps in Thailand. As of 2008, these families are still not allowed to leave. Recent findings have indicated that this restriction is largely for economic rather than political reasons. In particular, Kayan women who wear brass rings are not allowed to leave the village. This is because the Thai government fears that if tourists can see these women for free in cities and towns, then they will not pay to see them in the villages.
