= Nai Soi Community Learning Center =

The Nai Soi Community Learning Center (NSCLC) is a non-profit ecologically sustainable school for high school aged refugee children from Myanmar. The NSCLC is located in the village of Nai Soi, in Mae Hong Son Province, Thailand.

The students study both the English and Burmese languages, organic farming, and community development in order to prepare them to become leaders in assisting their communities recover from the 24-year-old military conflict in Burma that forced their emigration.

The school needs financial support and more importantly people to volunteer to teach English, sustainable development and community development, or organic farming. If the applicant is qualified he or she will receive free room and board at the school. They must only pay for their own transportation to and from the school from their home country.
