= Neck ring =

Jewellery worn around the neck

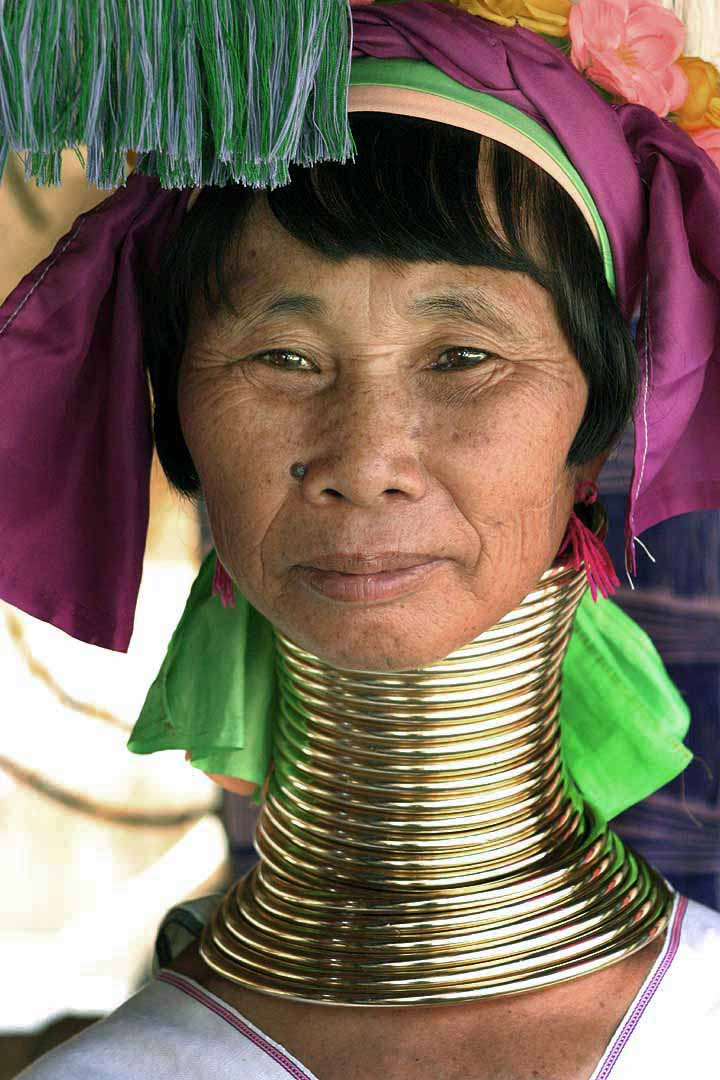
- A Kayan woman wearing neck rings
- Location: Neck
- Jewelry: Closure mechanism Wire construction Cultural or sculptural form

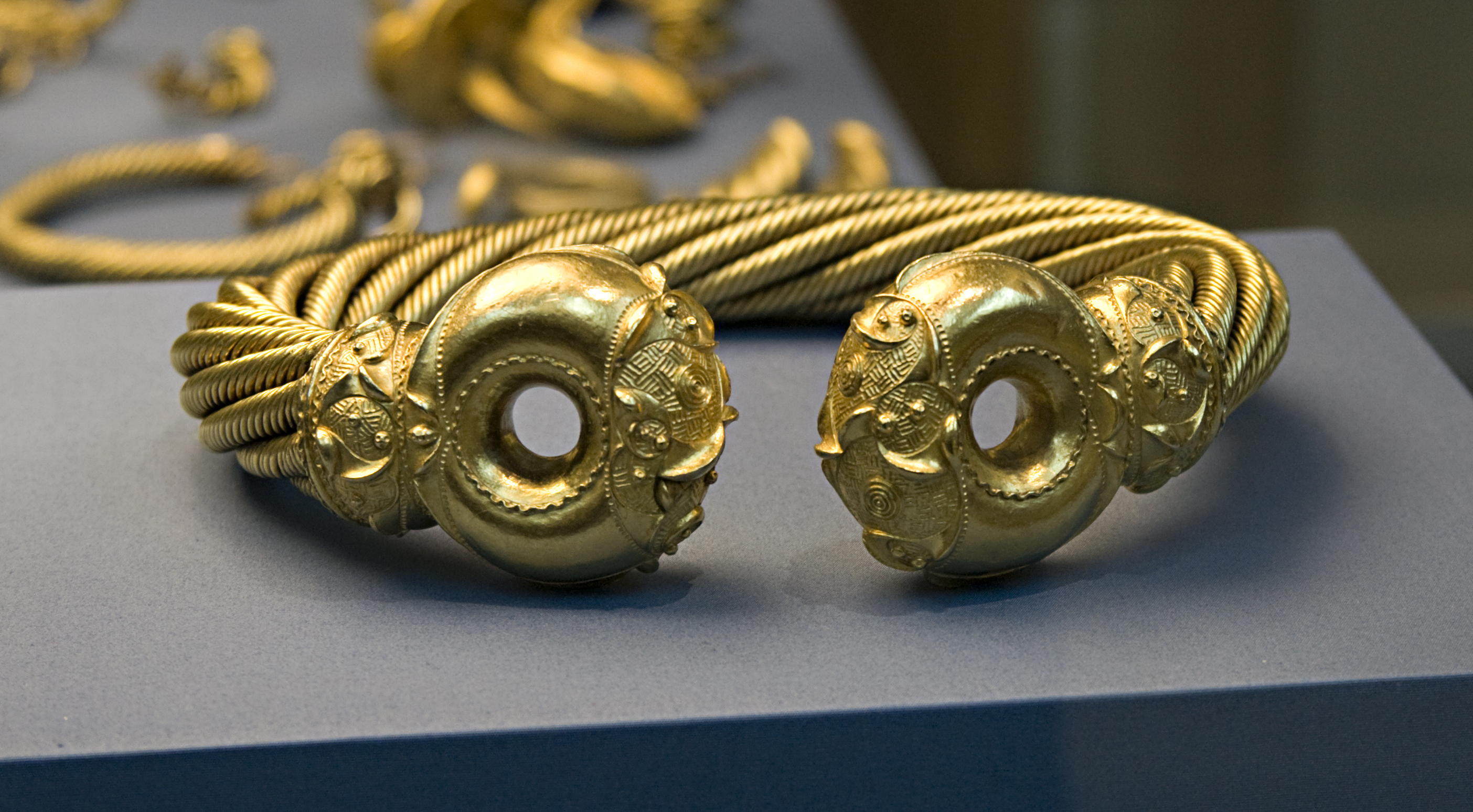
The Celtic gold Snettishham Torc, England, 1st century BC.

Neck rings, or neck-rings, are any form of stiff jewellery worn as an ornament around the neck of an individual, as opposed to a loose necklace. Many cultures and periods have made neck rings, with both males and females wearing them at various times. Neck rings that are rarely or never removed are a type of permanent jewellery.

Of the two most notable types, one is the torc, an often heavy and valuable ornament normally open at the throat. These were worn by various early cultures but are especially associated with the ancient Celts of the European Iron Age, where they were evidently a key indicator of wealth and status, mostly worn by men.

The other type is one or more spiral metal coils of many turns, often worn only by married women.

== Illusion of elongation ==
In a few African and Asian cultures, neck rings are worn usually to create the appearance that the neck has been stretched.

The custom of wearing neck rings is related to an ideal of beauty: an elongated neck. Neck rings push the clavicle and ribs down. The neck stretching is mostly illusory: the weight of the rings twists the collarbone and eventually the upper ribs at an angle 45 degrees lower than what is natural, causing the illusion of an elongated neck. The vertebrae do not elongate, though the space between them may increase as the intervertebral discs absorb liquid.

The custom requires that the girls who wear the neck rings start before puberty, in order to get the body used to them. These heavy coils can weigh as much as 11 pounds (5 kg).

== Role of tourism ==
Tourism is often considered to encourage the use of neck rings in Myanmar, as they are a popular attraction for tourists.

== Kayan ==
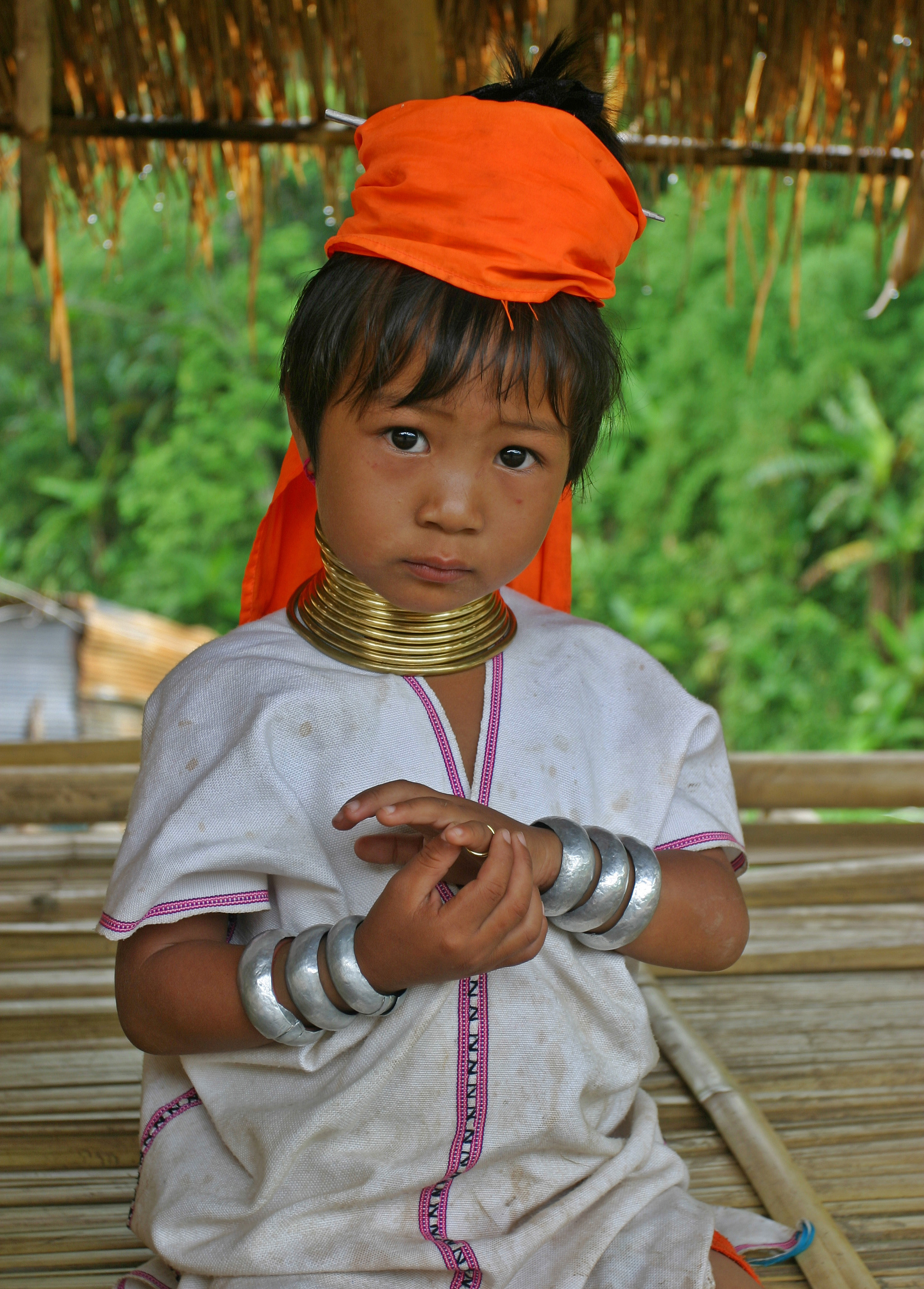
A Kayan Lahwi girl in 2004

Padaung (Kayan Lahwi) women of the Kayan people begin to wear neck coils from as young as age two. The length of the coil is gradually increased to as much as twenty turns. The weight of the coils will eventually place sufficient pressure on the clavicles (collarbone) to cause them to deform and create an impression of a longer neck. This beauty ideal comes from Kayan legends where the elongated necks were meant to appear similar to the necks of a dragon or to help prevent fatal wounds from tiger attacks. Another story explains that this custom came to be so that the women would not be taken by neighboring tribes who may not like elongated necks.

Kayan girls usually begin to wear brass collars from the age of five to six years old, as it is more comfortable to deform the collarbone and upper ribs slowly. The alternative, an accelerated process at around the age of twelve, when girls first begin to compete for the attention of boys, is painful. Marco Polo first described the practice to Western culture in c. 1300. Refugee practitioners in Thailand were first accessible to tourists in 1984.

== Ndebele ==
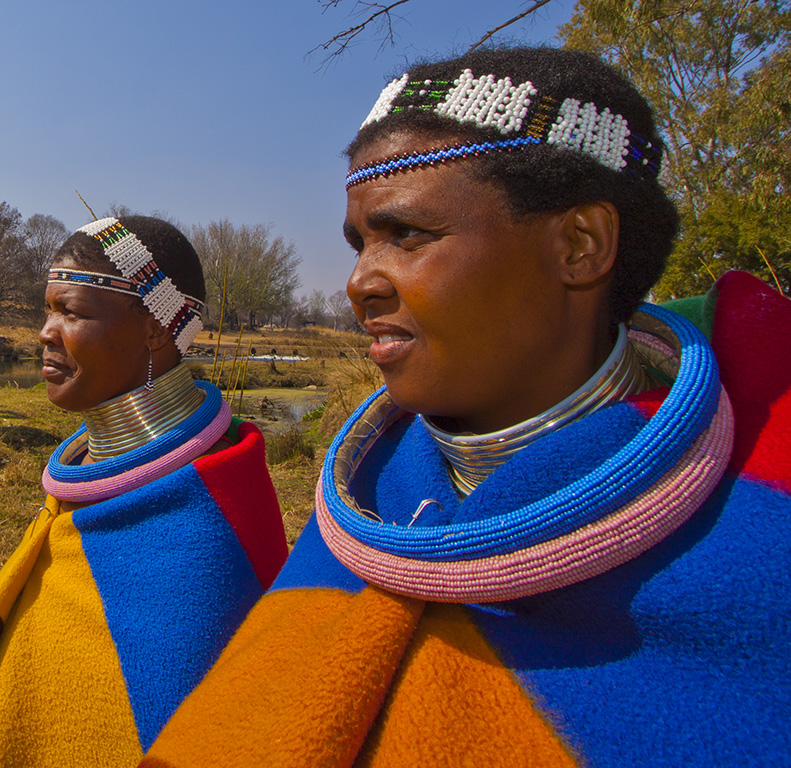
Traditional Ndebele dress

The South Ndebele peoples of Africa also wear neck rings as part of their traditional dress and as a sign of wealth and status. Only married women are allowed to wear the rings, called dzilla. Metal rings are also worn on different parts of the body, not just the neck. They can be worn around the arms and legs. Traditionally these rings are given to a wife by her husband, and not removed until the husband's death; however, these rings are individual and do not function as a body modification. The rings are usually made of copper or brass, usually stacked in multiples of three.

== See also ==
- Body modification
- Foot binding
- Tightlacing
