= Zayein people =

Ethnic group in Myanmar

Zayein
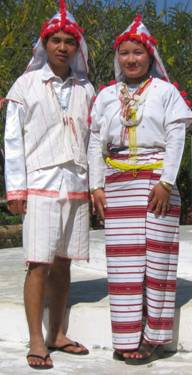
- A Zayein couple in one of their traditional dress

Total population
- c. 15245 (est.)

Regions with significant populations
- Myanmar

Languages
- Lahta Language (Zayein)

Religion
- Christianity (Baptists, Roman Catholic, Folk religion, and Theravada Buddhism

Related ethnic groups
- Karenni people, Karen people, Pa'O people

The Zayein (Burma: ဇယိန်လူမျိုး) are a sub-group of the Red Karen (Karenni people), a Tibeto-Burman ethnic minority in Myanmar (Burma). They are also known as Lahta (Kayan Lahta) and Loilong Karen. The Zayein are native to Pinlaung and Pekon Townships in Southern Shan State, Myanmar. According to a 2013 list, there are 65 Zayein villages with a total population of 15,245 in Southern Shan State.

== Etymology ==
=== Zayein ===
Speakers of Zayein refer to their language simply as Zayein or Ta-yun. The Zayein are divided into two subgroups—the Kwungsaung and the Pahlaing—which appear to speak markedly different dialects. In fact, "Zayein" is a collective term for the language, also known as the Sawng-Tüng dialect, and its speakers belong to the same ethnic group, despite their distinctive dress and cultural customs.

=== Lamung Karen ===
The Lamung speak the Sawng-Tüng language.

=== Lahta ===
Lahta is spoken in the area between Moebye and Pekon, particularly in western Pekon Township. It is considered a dialect of the Sawng-Tüng Karen language.

== History ==
According to tradition, in ancient times a race of Karens known as the Sawng-tüng (or Lon-tüng) inhabited a region called Lon-tüng, southeast of Thaton in the Amherst district of Burma. Either due to an unsuitable climate or, more likely, because of the internal strife that followed the capture of the Taung-thu king by the King of Pagan, twenty households—comprising approximately one hundred individuals—left Lon-tüng and migrated north until they arrived at a location southwest of the present-day sites of Ngwe-daung and Naungpale. There, they selected a site, cleared the hills, and built a village which they named Lon-tüng (or Sawng-tüng) after their original homeland. They remained there for ten years until the soil was exhausted, after which they migrated to Loi Ling Ela in the present-day state of Mong Pai. After residing for 12 years, the majority moved northwest and founded a village at Ham Bang ("yellow earth"), now known as Loi Long. However, a few families remained at Loi-linh Ela, and their descendants still reside there. Loi Long is located in the extreme south of the present-day Loi Long State (now Pinlaung Township), an area that appears to have been uninhabited at the time. Settlement proceeded without difficulty, and the original twenty households increased to such an extent that a group eventually broke off to found another village called Ban-sang, on a site south of the present-day village of Pin-nga. Although the village of Ban-sang no longer exists, the hill that bears its name attests to the historical settlement.

The next significant development among the Sawng-tüng occurred—according to tradition—three hundred and sixty years after the founding of Ban-sang, with the establishment of the village of Lom-swi. Fifteen years later, the first mention of a chief appears. La-tang, the ruler of the Sawng-tüng state, died and was succeeded by his brother, La-ku, who wished to revisit the house of his ancestors and thus abdicated in favor of his son, La-kawng. One of La-kawng's first acts was to relocate the village of Lom-swi to Lom-kye, a short distance southeast of Ban-sang and near the site of the original settlement. Upon La-kawng's death, his brother La-sa succeeded him and proceeded to delineate the boundaries of the Sawng-tüng state. In one portion of the state, the boundary was defined by a row of trees on which several hornets' nests were found—hornets that were highly valued as a food source when roasted among the Sawng-tüng. Shortly after the demarcation, a child from a group led by Chief La-neing, whose headquarters was at Ban-pa, ventured into the jungle to collect firewood and was stung to death by hornets from La-sa's boundary trees. Upon hearing the news, La-neing ordered those trees to be cut down and burned. Indignant, La-sa prepared for war. He summoned all the able-bodied Sawng-tüng men but, finding his forces insufficient to attack Ban-pa, formed an alliance with the chief of Sawng-ke. This treaty was cemented by the marriage of his son, La-tein, to the daughter of the Sawng-ke chieftain. A great feast was held, mutual oaths of alliance were taken, many buffaloes, pigs, and fowls were slaughtered, and kaung-ye (rice beer) was consumed. Subsequently, the allies attacked Ban-pa, captured the settlement, and massacred its inhabitants. La-sa immediately settled in Ban-pa, whose strategic position was deemed very strong, and it has since remained the capital of the Sawng-tüng people.

Shortly thereafter, a man named La-pye arrived from Lon-tüng, the original seat of the people, with new immigrants. La-sa saw this as an opportunity to extend his territory at the expense of the Shans of the Nawk Wo valley. The first expedition resulted in the overthrow of the Sawng-tüng by the Shans under La-leing, La-mung, and Ariya. La-sa then organized another expedition, deploying three columns. Although the Shans defeated one column, they were caught between the other two and ultimately defeated, allowing La-pye and a few men from Ban-pa to settle in the new territory. The Kathe hill and the Loi-pyi country were also annexed and colonized by men from Ham Bang, who were joined five years later by new colonists from Lon-tüng. After this, La-sa reigned in peace for five years before dying; he was succeeded by his son La-tein, who had until then been living with his father-in-law at Sawng-ke.

La-tein subsequently moved to Ban-pa and, after a peaceful reign of six years, resolved to further extend the Sawng-tüng state. He attacked the Taung-thu (Pa-O) village of Pin-Mun, located about twenty-nine miles northeast of Ban-pa, driving out the inhabitants along with their chief, La-pring. Having organized his state in this manner, he sought to increase its population by incorporating Shan and Taung-thu peoples. To this end, he sent La-lui, an influential figure, to establish a village at Pin-laung. La-lui was entirely successful, and Pin-laung was founded in 1156 B.E. (1794).
