= Ban Mai Nai Soi refugee camp =

Burmese refugee camp in Mae Hong Son, Thailand

Ban Mai Nai Soi refugee camp is a refugee camp established in Karenni State, Myanmar, in 1989, which had an estimated population of 19,512 in 2008. The camp has moved many times, finally settling in its current position in Pang Moo Subdistrict, Muang District, Mae Hong Son province, Thailand, in 1996. Sections of the camp were attacked by Burmese forces in 1996 and 1998. Shelling by Burmese forces and their allies caused one death and several injuries in 1997.

The camp's population is 94% Karenni and 3% Karen, among others.

The camp's residents face ongoing challenges, including limited access to education under the strict oversight of Thailand's Ministry of Interior. Organisations such as WEAVE (Women's Education for Advancement and Empowerment), in collaboration with the Karenni National Women's Organisation, provide critical support through initiatives such as the Women's Studies Program.
