= Tagundaing =

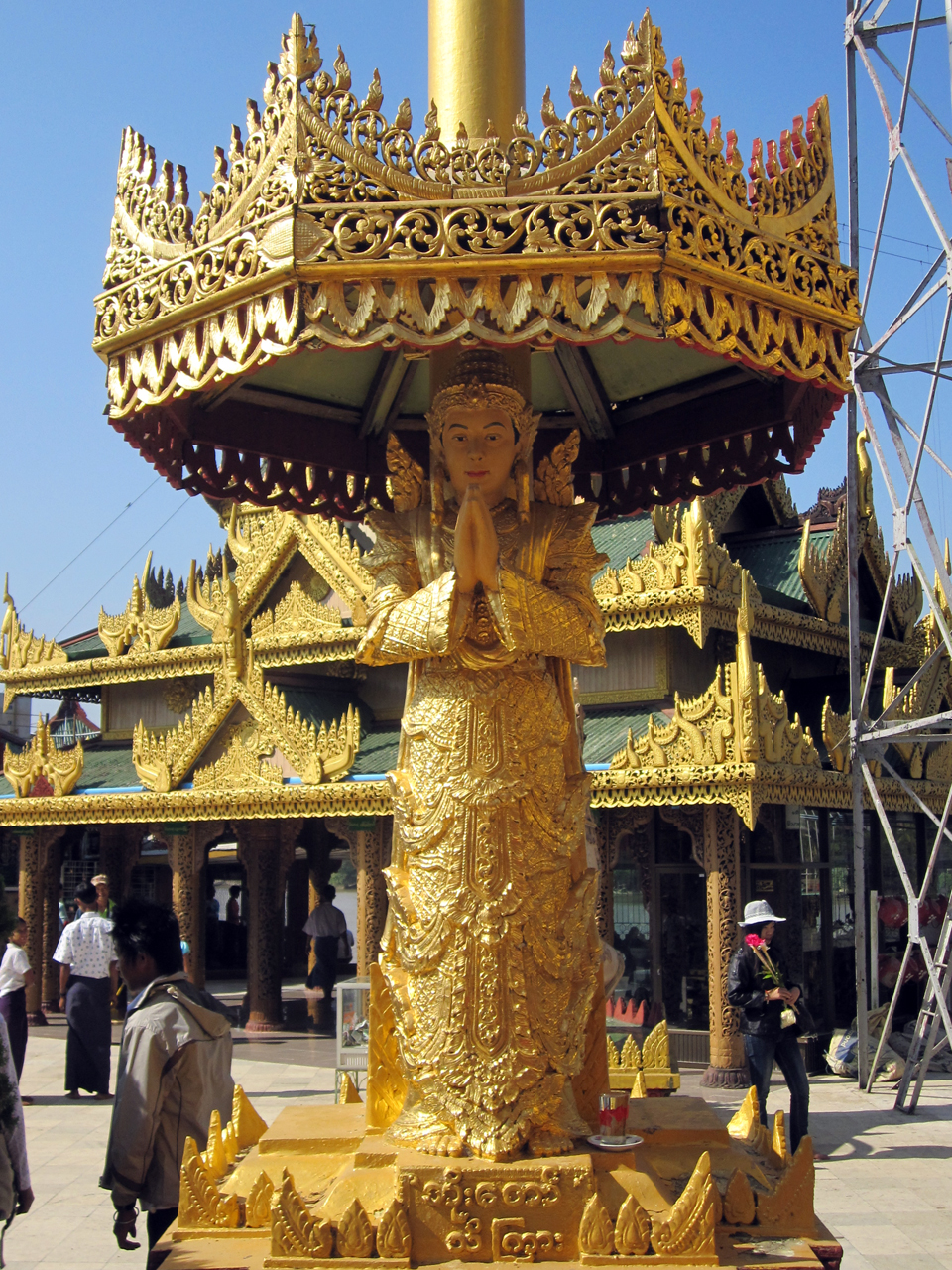
The base of the tagundaing at the Ye Le Pagoda in Kyauktan features Thagyamin.

Tagundaing (Burmese: တံခွန်တိုင်) refers to an ornamented victory column or flagstaff, typically 60 to 80 feet (18 to 24 m), found within the grounds of Burmese Buddhist pagodas and kyaungs (monasteries). These ornamented columns were raised within religious compounds to celebrate the submission of nats (local animistic spirits) to the Dhamma, the Buddhist doctrine and inspired by the Pillars of Ashoka.

A mythical hintha (or more rarely a kinnara) is generally found perching atop the column, while the base of the column may be decorated with Thagyamin. Vasudhara, the earth goddess, may also be found at the base.

== Examples ==
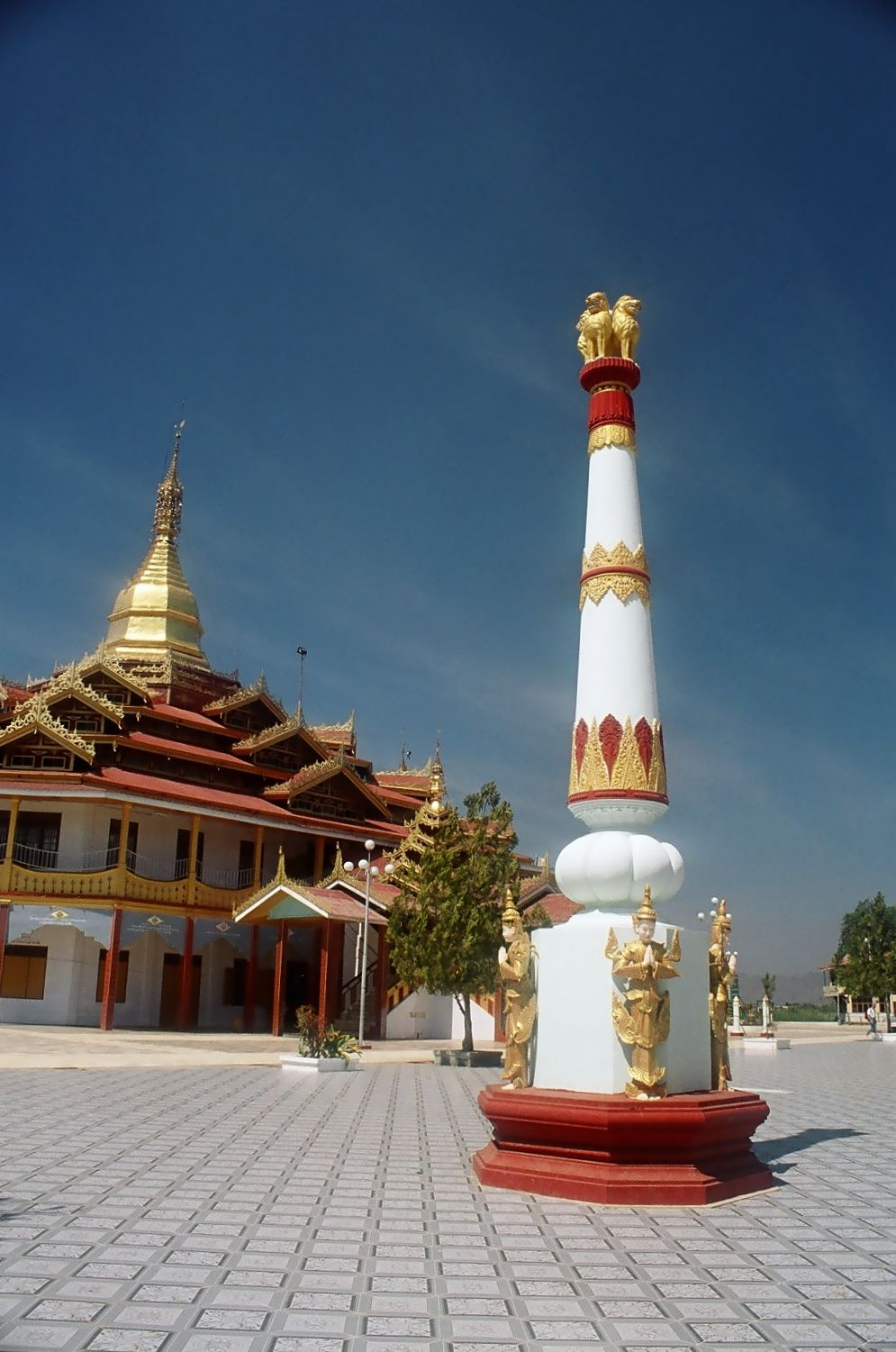
Tagundaing at the Hpaung Daw U Pagoda modeled after the Pillars of Ashoka

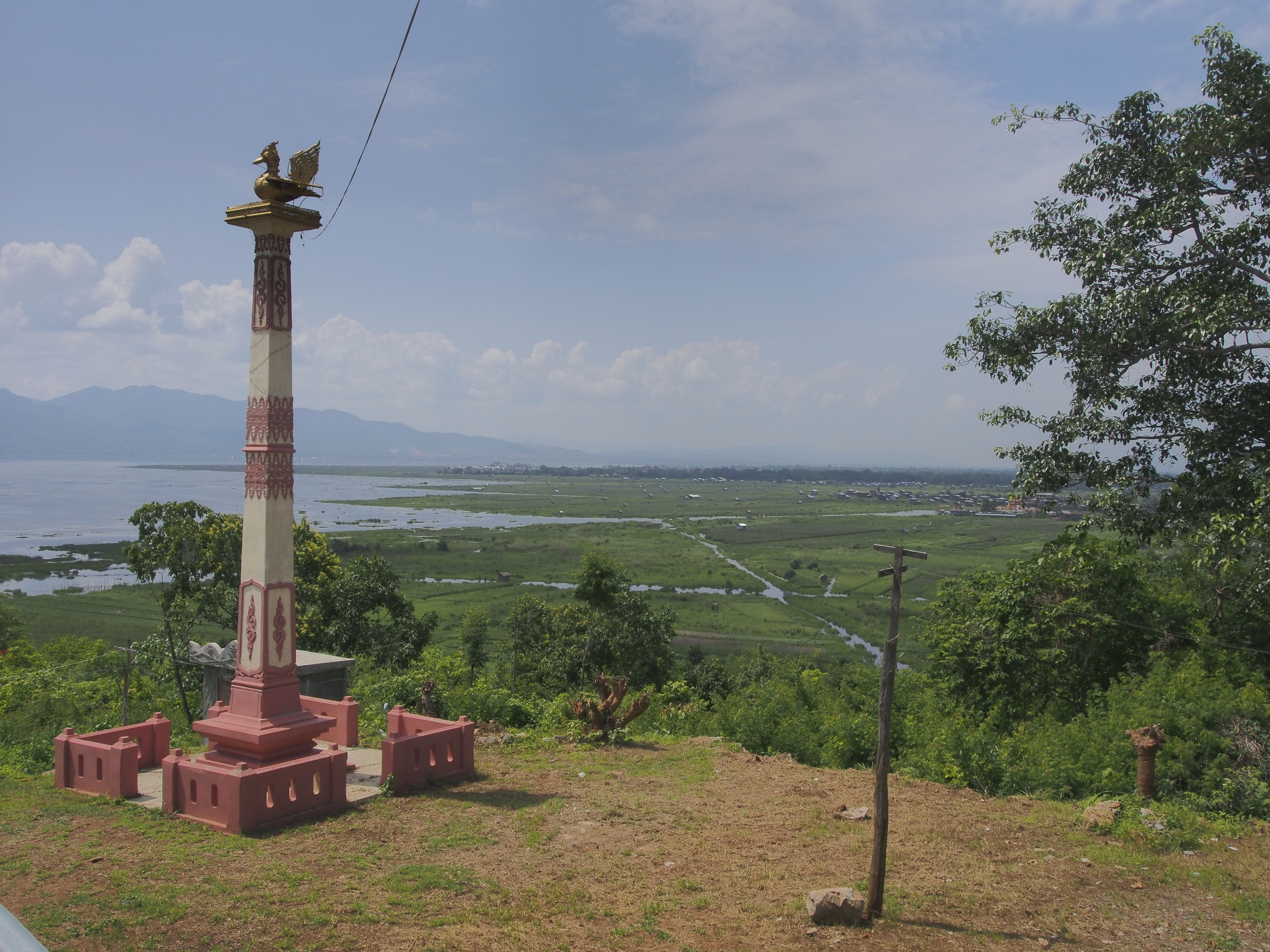

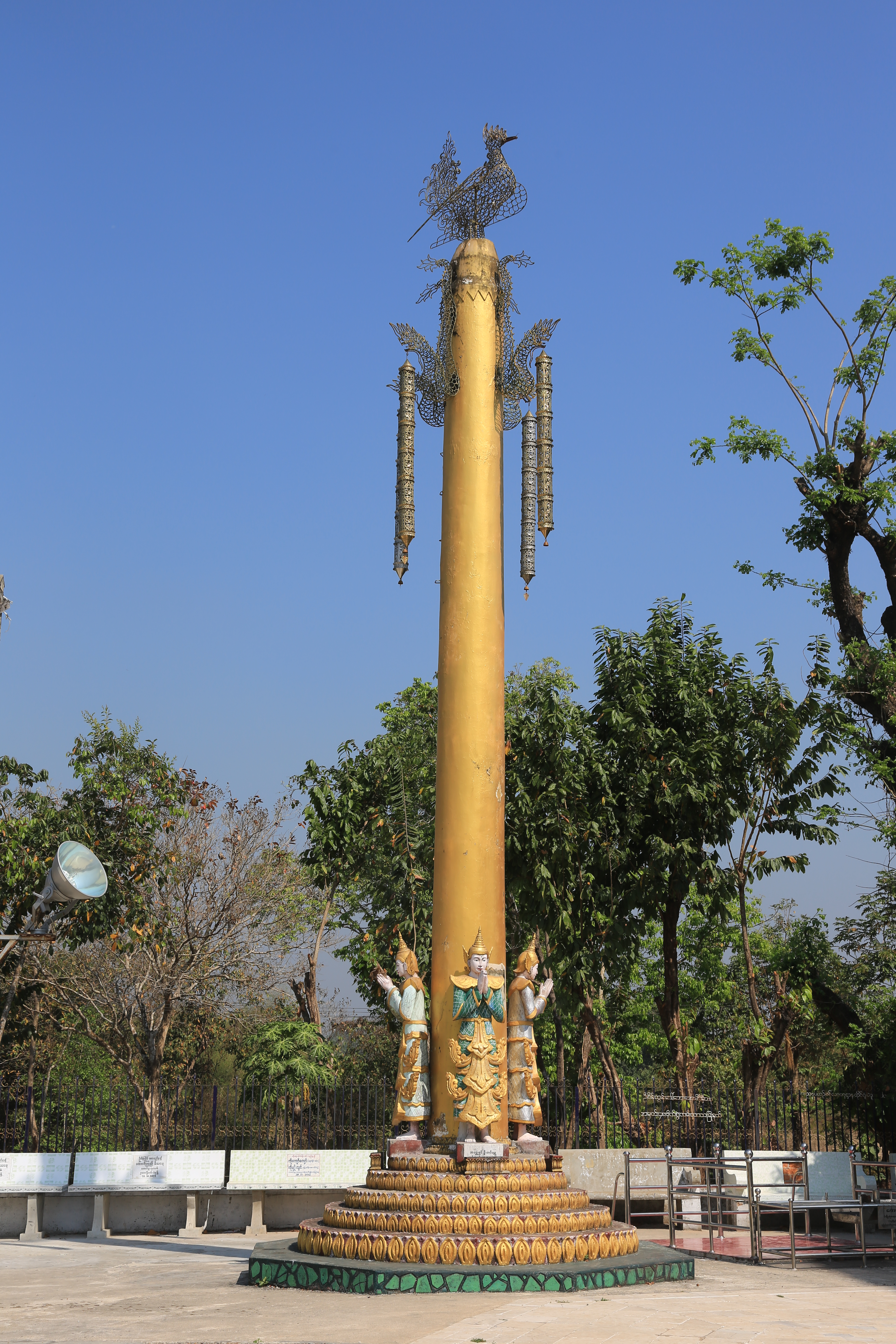

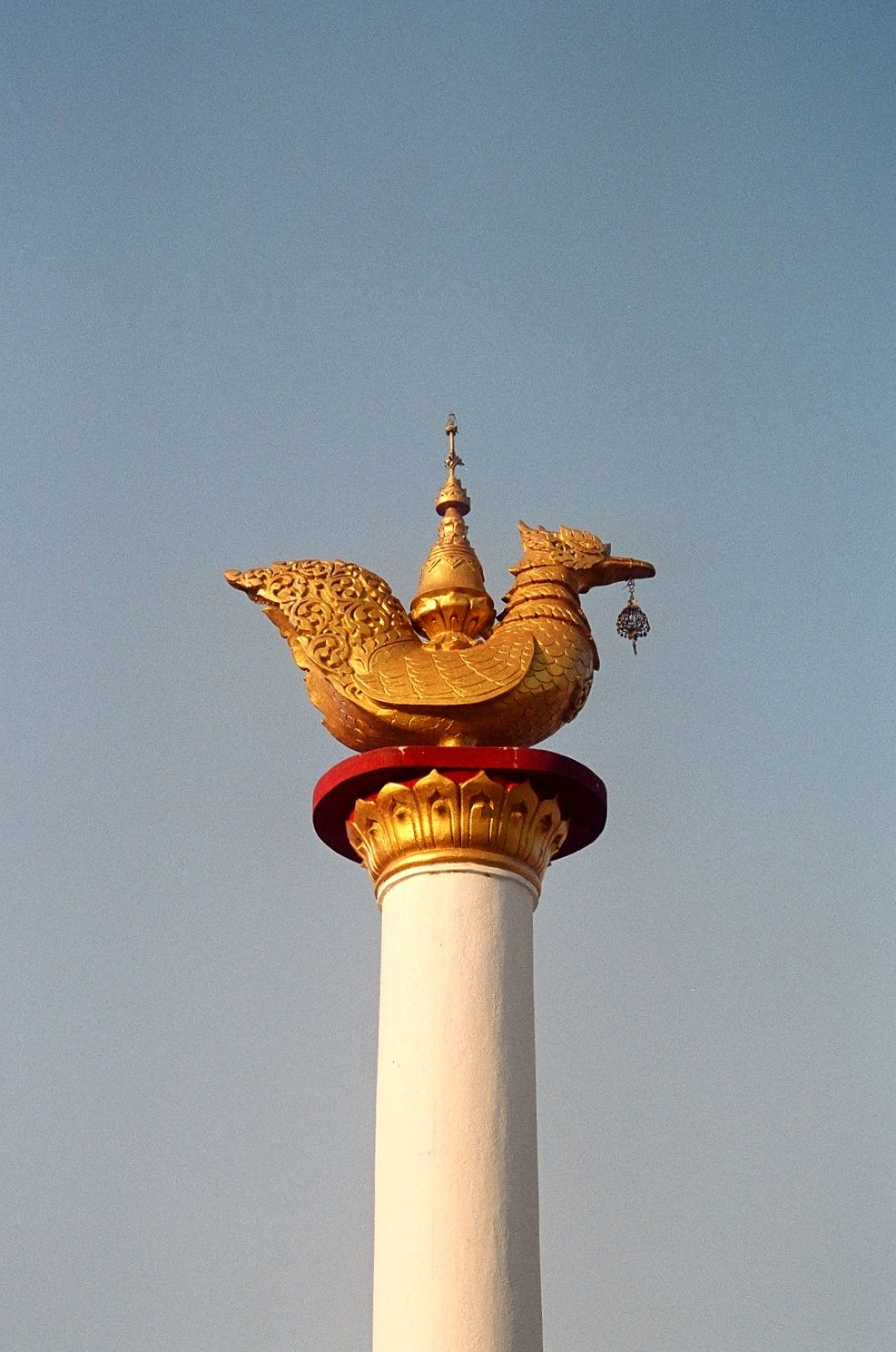

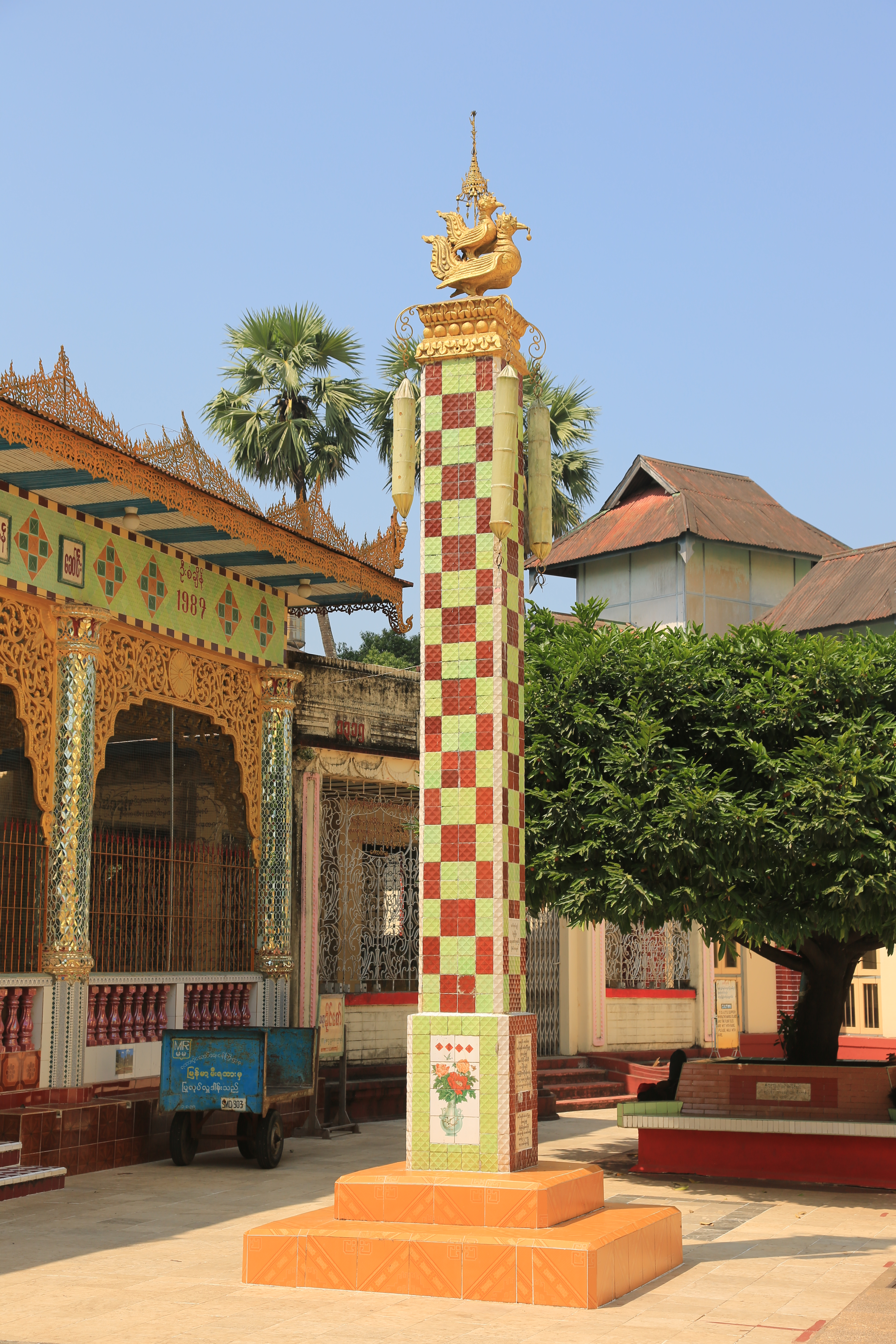

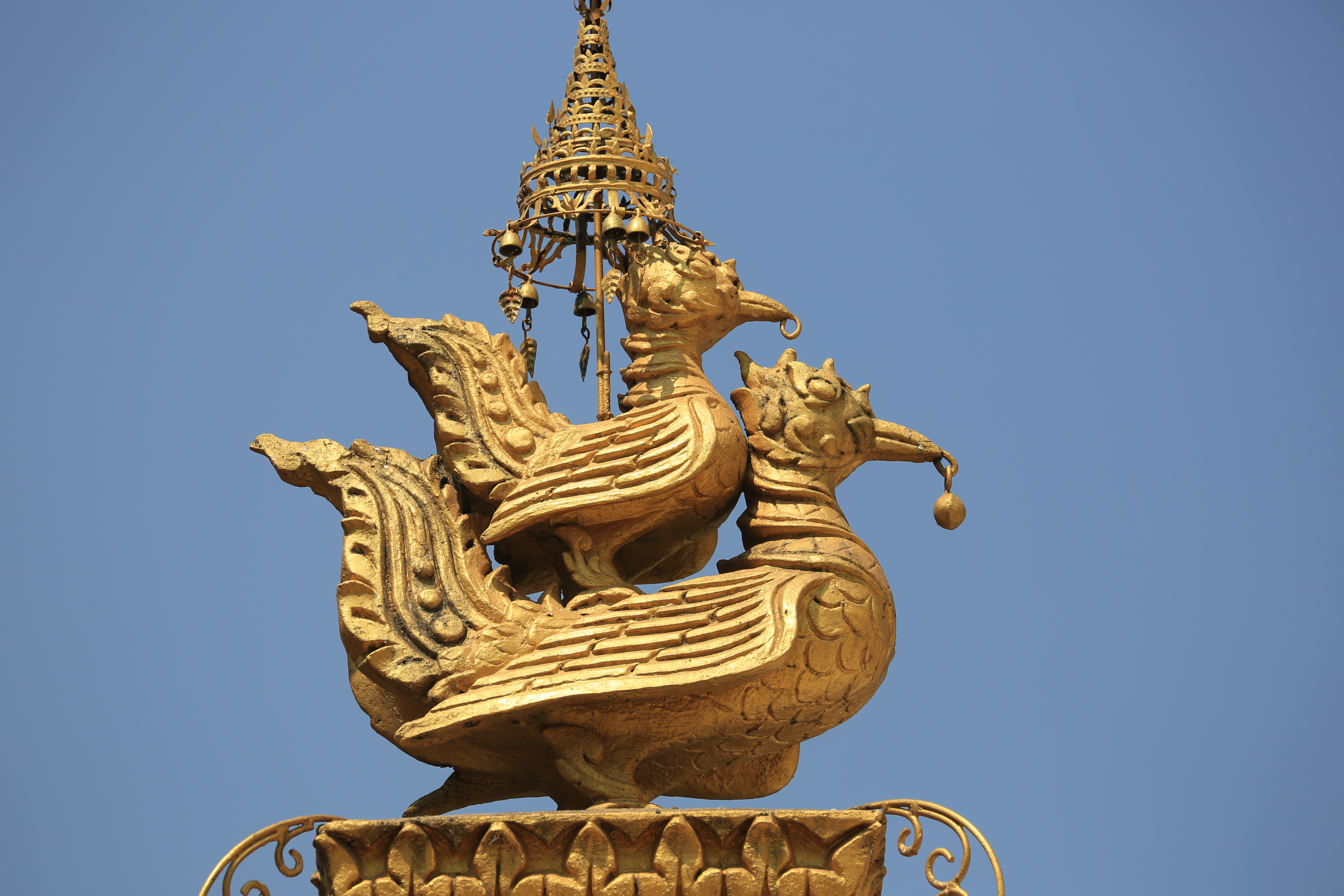

== See also ==
  - Ancient iron production
  - Ashoka's Major Rock Edicts
  - Dhar iron pillar
  - Hindu temple architecture
  - History of metallurgy in South Asia
  - Iron pillar of Delhi
  - List of Edicts of Ashoka
  - Pillars of Ashoka
  - Stambha

== See also ==
- Pillars of Ashoka
- Lak Mueang
