= Aldo Cipullo =

Italian-born American jewelry designer

- Born: November 18, 1935; Naples, Italy
- Died: February 4, 1984 (aged 48); New York City, U.S.
- Occupation: Jewelry designer

Aldo Cipullo (1935 – 1984) was an Italian-born American jewelry designer.

== Early life and education ==
Cipullo was born on November 18, 1935, in Naples, Italy and later grew up largely in Rome. His father owned a costume jewelry manufacturing business and so he was born into a design family. After finishing graduating school, he began an apprenticeship in the jewelry industry. He immigrated to America in 1959 where he started his studies at Manhattan's School of Visual Arts.

== Career ==
After his studies he worked as designer for the American jeweler David Webb before joining Tiffany & Co.

In 1969 Cipullo began to work with Cartier.

When there he offered his design the Love bracelet to Cartier and created the "Juste Un Clou” (The Nails Collection) in 1971.

He also designed collections of costume and men's jewelry. The American Gem Society commissioned him in 1978 to create a collection of pieces using gems mined in North America, which is now seen at the Smithsonian Museum.

On February 4, 1984, he died after suffering two heart attacks at the age of 48.

== Awards ==
He won the Coty Award for jewelry in 1974.
