= Kay Htoe Boe =

Annual festival celebrated by Karenni people

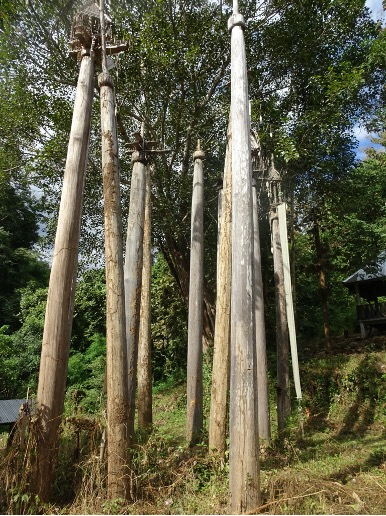
- Totem poles erected during Kay Htoe Boe celebrations
- Observed by: Karenni people
- Significance: marks the New Year
- Frequency: Annual

Kay Htoe Boe (Burmese: ကေ့ထျိုးဘိုး), is an annual festival celebrated by the Karenni people in April or May, marking the new year of the traditional Karenni calendar. The festival is held to encourage a bountiful harvest, favorable weather, good health, and peace.

== Names ==
The festival is known by various names, including Kay Htoe Boe (ကေ့ထျိုးဘိုး) or Trar-Ei-Loo in Karenni, Gam-Khumt in Geko Karen, and Tagundaing Festival (တံခွန်တိုင်ပွဲတော်) in Burmese.

== Origins ==
Close-up of the finials of kay htoe boe poles

According to Karenni legends, the Eugenia tree was the first to be grown after the creation of the world. Due to its significance, a tall and straight Eugenia tree is specially cut to serve as a totem pole called kay htoe boe on an auspicious day. The Karenni recognise three types of totems: male, female, and rice paddy. Male and female totem poles are alternated each year, while the shortest paddy totem pole is erected during harvest time, around the Tazaungdaing festival.

The Kayan, a subgroup of the Karenni people, believe that during the creation of the world, the earth lacked density. After digging a pole into the ground, the earth hardened into seven inner and outer layers to support life.

The totem poles are also closely linked to Burmese Buddhism, as poles known as tagundaing are erected on monastic and pagoda grounds.

== Celebrations ==
Villages throughout Kayah State organise the annual festivities.

Chicken bone reading

Before cutting down the tree, Karenni oracles and shamans read chicken bones to prophesize the year ahead, by reading the holes of chicken thigh bones. Pigs are sometimes slaughtered to predict the health of the pole's spirit guardian by interpreting the health of the slaughtered pig's liver.

The primary celebration revolves around a sacred totem pole. A tall and straight Eugenia tree is specially cut to serve as a totem pole called kay htoe boe on an auspicious day. The tree is specially carved and prepared for installation on auspicious grounds, typically near other totem poles. Worshippers venerate the creator and other deities after the pole is mounted. The pole is believed to have four levels signifying the stars, the sun, the moon, and the ladder. The pole is decorated with beehives woven from bamboo threads to attract the spirits, and a ladder, in the form of white cloth and wooden reeds, is draped over the pole. A shrine called kantan is also built next to the pole, where offerings are placed. After erecting the pole at an auspicious site, revelers pay homage to the pole, offer lighted candles and incense sticks, and use springs of Eugenia leaves to sprinkle the pole with water.

Celebrants also host many competitions, including dances and competitions.

== Gallery ==
The Pwai dance.

Following the pwai dance the women sprinkle the men with water using eugenia leaves.

Cleansing Ceremony Rituals

== See also ==
- Cây nêu - Vietnamese New Year's pole
