= Phyay Rei =

Burmese politician

Member of the Amyotha Hluttaw
- Incumbent
- Assumed office 1 February 2016
- Constituency: Kayah State No.2
- Majority: 15763 votes

Personal details
- Born: 9 January 1976 (age 50) Loikaw, Kayah State, Burma (Myanmar)
- Party: National League for Democracy
- Parent(s): Yei Rei (father); Khyar Myhar (mother)
- Education: Technological University, Loikaw; Loikaw University

Phyay Rei (Burmese: ဖြေရယ်ခ, also known as Myint Than Tun, born 9 January 1976) is a Burmese politician who currently serves as a House of Nationalities member of parliament for Kayah State № 1 constituency.

== Early life and education ==
He was born on 9 January 1976 in Loikaw, Kayah State, Burma (Myanmar). He graduated with G.T.I. (Civil) from Technological University, Loikaw and B.A. (History) from Loikaw University.

== Political career ==
He is a member of the National League for Democracy. In the 2015 Myanmar general election, he was elected as an Amyotha Hluttaw MP, winning a majority of 15763 votes and elected representative from Kayah State № 1 parliamentary constituency. He also serves as a member of Amyotha Hluttaw Government’s Guarantees, Pledges and Undertakings Vetting Committee.
