= Marwi =

Deputy leader of KNDF

- မာဝီ
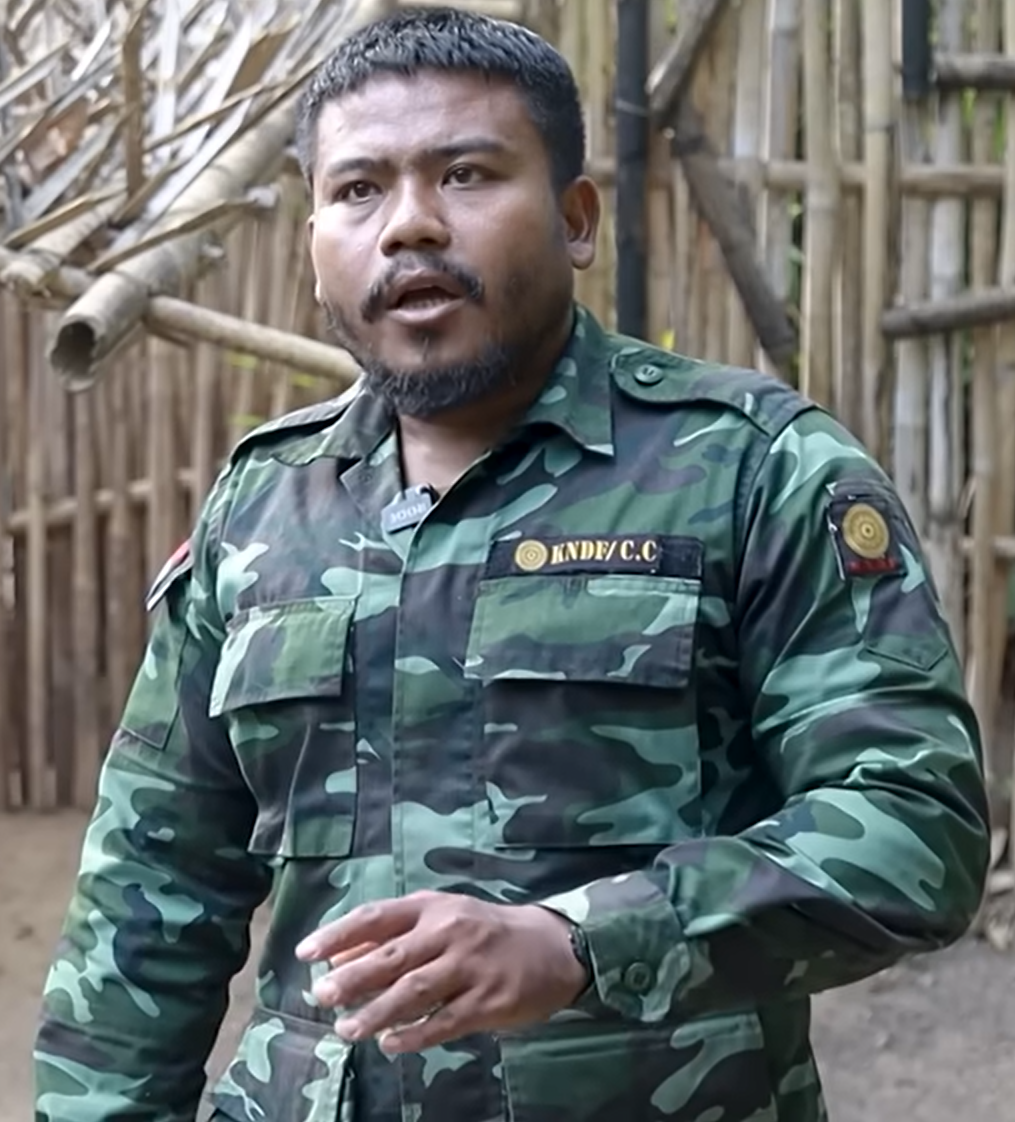
- Marwi in 2024

Deputy Commander-in-Chief of the Karenni Nationalities Defence Force
- Incumbent
- Assumed office 2021

Military service
- Allegiance: Karenni Nationalities Defence Force
- Rank: Deputy Commander-in-Chief
- Battles/wars: Myanmar civil war (2021–present)

Marwi (Burmese: မာဝီ) is a Burmese environmentalist and resistance figure who serves as deputy commander-in-chief of the Karenni Nationalities Defence Force (KNDF).

== Biography ==
Born and raised in Loikaw, Kayah State, he worked on an organic farm prior to joining the KNDF in the aftermath of the 2021 Myanmar coup d'état. He participated in the early anti-military protests in 2021 before assuming a senior leadership role within the KNDF; according to reports, access to certain KNDF-controlled areas in Kayah State requires his authorization. He has stated that although he preferred to remain an organic farmer, he joined the resistance in response to the military takeover. Marwi has become known for regularly joining his troops on the front lines, a commitment that has resulted in him being injured three times in battle. Notably, he led the operation to capture Loikaw University, where he successfully convinced dozens of junta troops to surrender.

== See also ==
- Karenni Nationalities Defence Force
- Myanmar civil war (2021–present)
