= Aung Kyaw Soe =

Burmese politician

Member of the Amyotha Hluttaw
- Incumbent
- Assumed office 1 February 2016
- Constituency: Kayah State No.7
- Majority: 1431 votes

Personal details
- Born: 18 September 1968 (age 57) Loikaw, Kayah State, Burma (Myanmar)
- Party: National League for Democracy
- Parent(s): Shwe Soe (father); Naw A Si (mother)

Aung Kyaw Soe (Burmese: အောင်ကျော်စိုး; born 18 September 1968) is a Burmese politician currently serving as a House of Nationalities MP for Kayah State No. 7 constituency.

== Early life and education ==
He was born on 18 September 1968 in Loikaw, Kayah State, Burma (Myanmar).

== Political career ==
He is a member of the National League for Democracy. In the Myanmar general election, 2015, he was elected as an Amyotha Hluttaw MP, winning a majority of 1431 votes and elected representative from Kayah State No. 7 parliamentary constituency.
