= Mauk Kham Wah =

Filmmaker from Myanmar

- မောက်ခမ်းဝါ
- Born: Min Thu Kyaw; 1995 (age 30–31); Loikaw, Kayah State, Myanmar
- Occupations: Photographer, Filmmaker, Information officer (former)
- Employer: Loikaw PDF (former)
- Known for: "Retrieving the Dead"
- Awards: World Press Photo (singles category regional winner, 2023)

Mauk Kham Wah (Burmese: မောက်ခမ်းဝါ; born Min Thu Kyaw in 1995) is a Burmese photographer, filmmaker, and former information officer for the Loikaw PDF, known for his work documenting the resistance against the military junta that seized power in the coup of February 1, 2021. His work "Retrieving the Dead" won in the singles category of the 2023 World Press Photo Awards.

== Life and career ==
Mauk Kham Wah was born in 1995 in Loikaw, the capital of Karenni State. He studied at Yangon University of Economics.

He has been taking amateur photographs since his university days and is reportedly skilled in narrative and portrait photography. He has worked with famous directors such as Kyi Phyu Shin and Christina Kyi, and was an apprentice assistant director on Christina Kyi's film Now and Ever.

In 2017, he won second prize in the amateur category at the Yangon Photo Festival. During his student years, he served as president of the Yangon University of Economics Students' Union (UCSU) and published a student magazine titled Dana Myosun. He also participated in anti-military dictatorship movements following the 2021 Myanmar coup d'état.

Mauk Kham Wah returned to his homeland in September 2021, taking photographs on the battlefield and dedicating himself to using his camera as a tool of resistance. He has spent considerable time on the frontlines, particularly in Karenni State, witnessing firsthand the impact of the military's actions and the resilience of the People's Defense Forces (PDF). According to an interview with Mauk Kham Wah, he spent approximately eight months of the year on the frontline. He was in charge of information for the Loikaw PDF, and his photographs are being used for the force's information dissemination and fundraising activities.

One of Mauk Kham Wah's most recognized works is "Retrieving the Dead", a photo that earned him a regional award in the 2023 World Press Photo Contest. This poignant image, taken in Moebye, Karenni State, on February 21, 2022, depicts a PDF member carrying the lifeless body of a fallen comrade. The photograph powerfully conveys the immense sorrow and sacrifice endured by those involved in the conflict. Mauk Kham Wah has shared that this particular image was captured during a battle where 17 of their comrades were killed, a moment that deeply affected him and made it difficult to even press the shutter.

His work includes Comradeship (rough cut, 2023), a short film that explores the People's Defense Force's efforts to retrieve a comrade's body from the battlefield. In 2022, he received the Exile Hub's Critical Voices Grant, further supporting his important work.

On 6 September 2024, a fundraising film screening titled Flowers of Courage and Love was held at Payap University in Chiang Mai, northern Thailand. The event featured four short films, including The Unknown Infinity by Mauk Kham Wah. It was organized by Do One Thing, Artist's Shelter, and Payap University.

He is the founder of the brand Thu Pone (Rebels), which sells coffee and dried tea leaves to raise funds for PDF forces based in Karenni State. The brand is popular in northern Shan State and Karenni State, and all profits are directed to support the Loikaw and Ywangan PDF forces. However, following Mauk Kham Wah's sexual harassment scandal, his business partners in Thu Pone revealed that he had also misused profits from the brand. As a result, the brand's image has become controversial.

== Sexual harassment ==
In 2025, Mauk Kham Wah was dismissed from his position due to allegations of sexual harassment and misuse of funds during his tenure overseeing logistics and financial matters within the Loikaw PDF battalion. According to a statement released by the Loikaw PDF on 12 June 2025, he committed sexual harassment against a young woman on 23 May 2025. Following a thorough investigation by the relevant authorities, it was confirmed that an offense had occurred. Consequently, Mauk Kham Wah was officially expelled from the Loikaw People's Defense Force, effective 27 May 2025.

He faced significant criticism for this incident and became the target of social boycotts and public condemnation. Organizations and partners that had previously collaborated with him announced the termination of their partnerships, while others have suspended any potential collaborations until further notice. One of his close comrades and prominent revolutionary figures, Honey Nway Oo, responded to the incident by stating, "Never forgive. As one of the women striving to resist gender-based oppression, I strongly condemn this individual's actions."

Ten gender justice organizations also released a statement on June 14, demanding that the Karenni State Interim Executive Council (IEC) take action against Mauk Kham Wah.
