= Kandarawadi Palace =

Palace in Kayah State, Myanmar

- ကန္ဒရဝတီဟော်နန်း
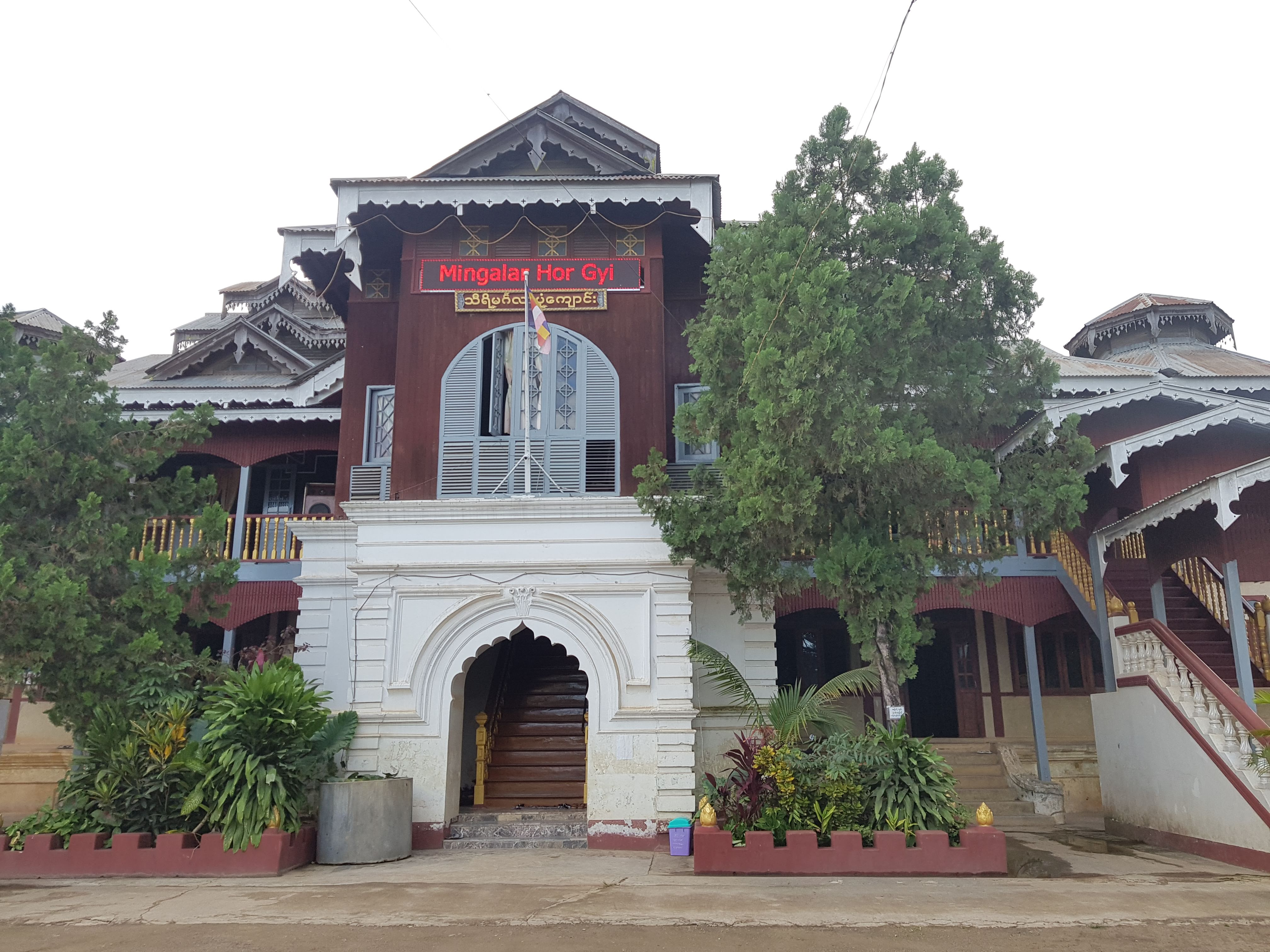
- Interactive map of the Kandarawadi Palace area

General information
- Location: Loikaw, Kayah State, Myanmar
- Coordinates: 19.669°N 97.204°E

Kandarawadi Palace, also known as the Kandarawadi Haw (Burmese: ကန္ဒရဝတီဟော်နန်း), is the former residence of the local ruler of Kandarawadi, a small principality in modern-day Myanmar (Burma). It is the last remaining palace in Kayah State to survive World War II.

== History ==
Kandarawadi Palace was built between 1912 and 1916 by Sao Khun Li. The palace was built in a mixture of British, Indian, and Burmese architectural styles.

During World War II, the palace was relatively unscathed, unlike other palaces in the region.

The last chieftain to occupy the palace was Sao Lawi. After his death in 1987, his children, Sao Lapor and Sao Kemawadi inherited the palace. They donated the palace in 1994 in order to establish a monastic school, which is now called Thiri Mingalabon Monastery (သီရိမင်္ဂလာပုံ ကျောင်း), locally known as the "Hawgyi Monastery."
