= Loikaw =

Capital of Kayah State, Myanmar

Loikaw ꤞꤤꤚꤤꤘꤢꤪ꤭ လွိုင်ကော်မြို့
- Capital Town
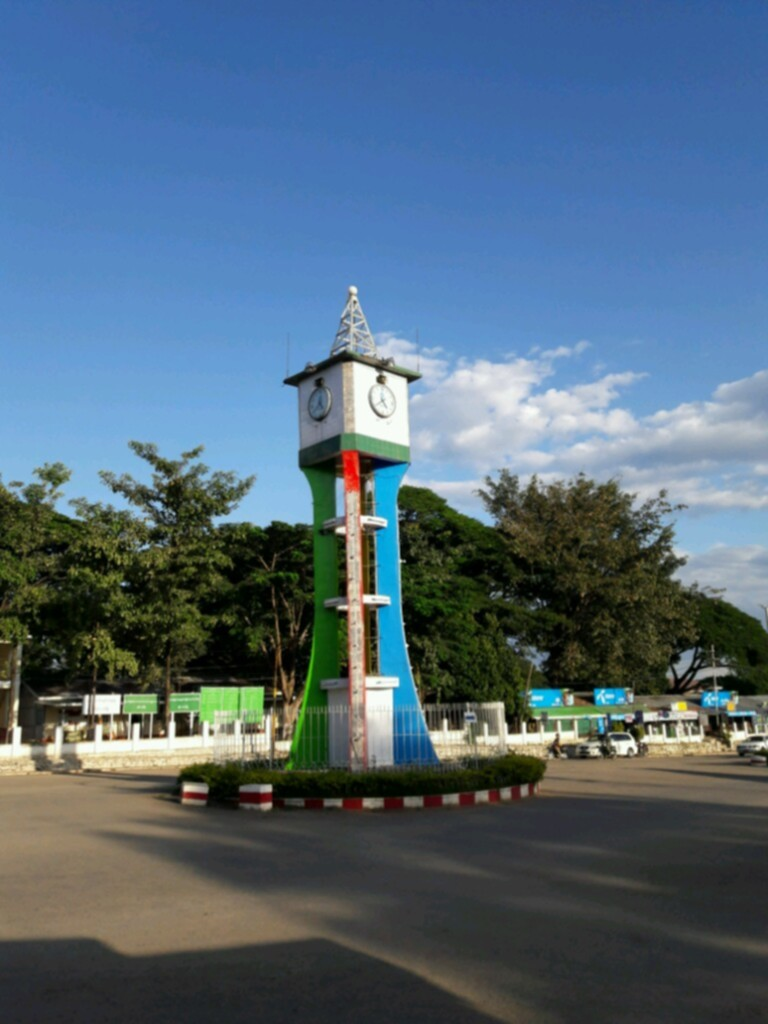
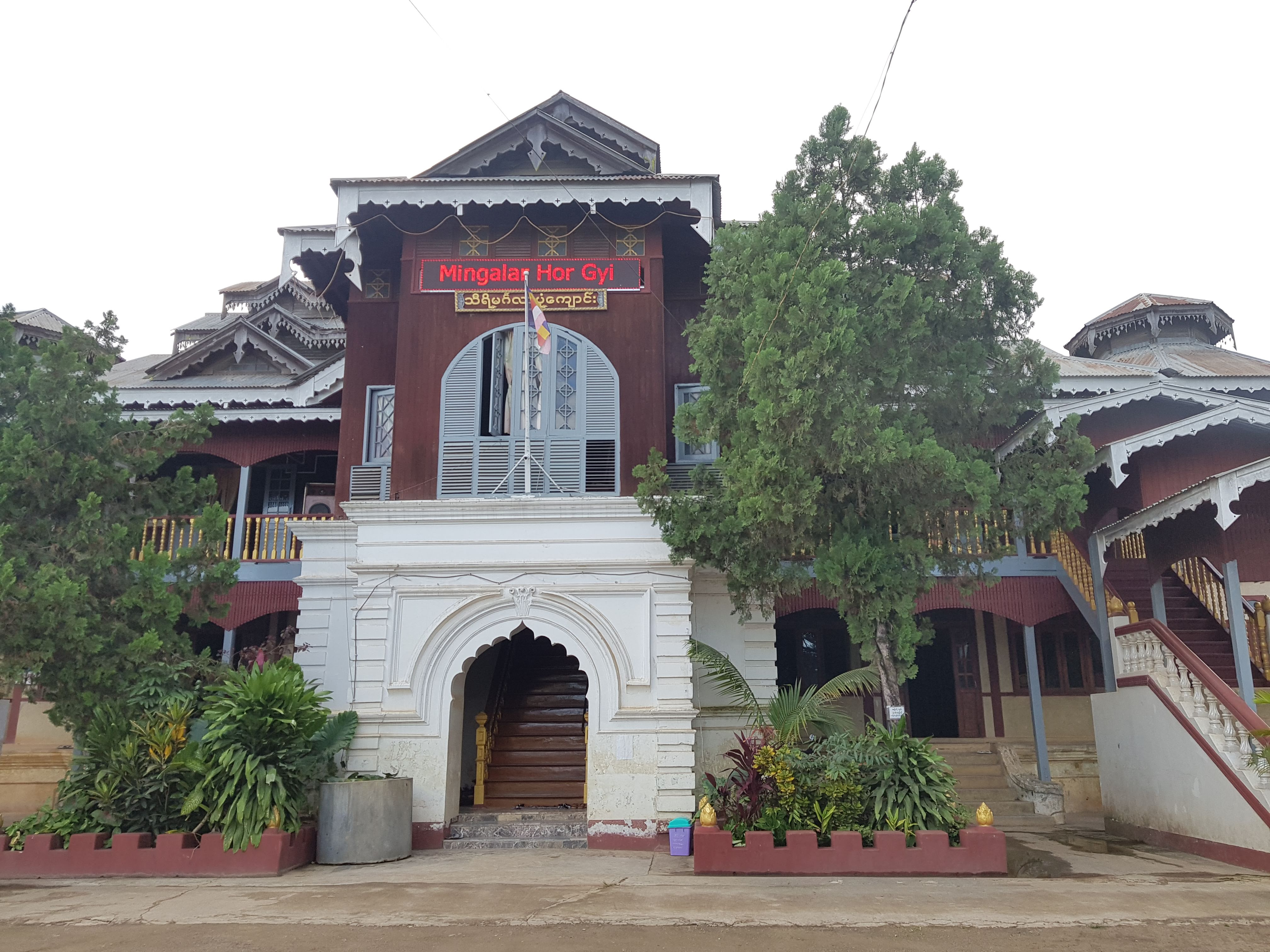
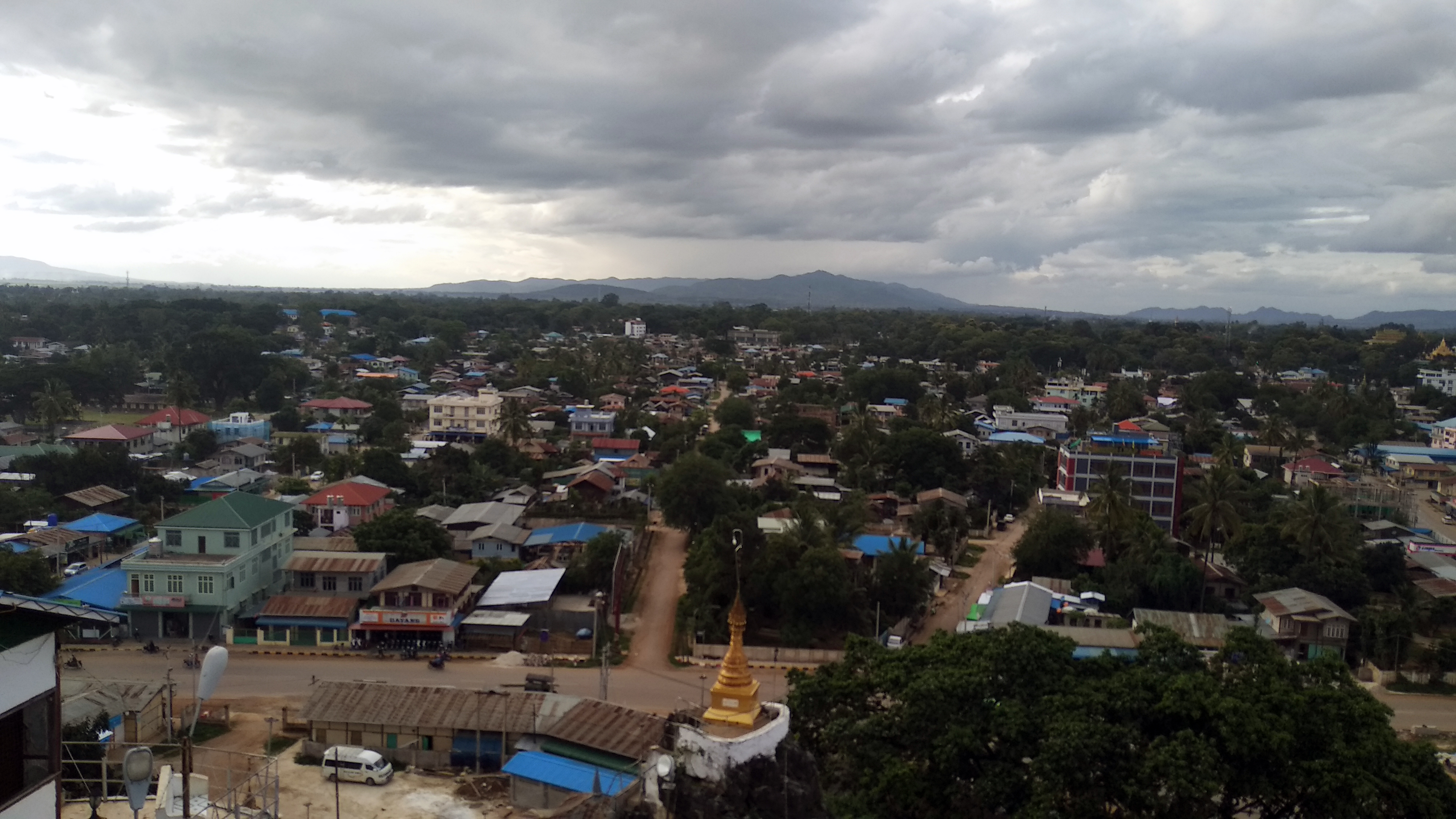
- Loikaw Clock Tower, Former palace of Kantarawadi, View of Loikaw (clockwise)
- Interactive map of Loikaw
- Coordinates: 19°40′27″N 97°12′34″E
- Country: Myanmar
- Region: Kayah State
- District: Loikaw
- Township: Loikaw

Government
  - Mayor: U Saw Hue Hue (USDP)

Area
  - Total: 10.3 sq mi (27 km^{2})
- Elevation: 2,900 ft (884 m)

Population (2026)
  - Total: 63,694
  - Density: 6,180/sq mi (2,390/km^{2})
  - Ethnicities: Karenni; Bamar; Shan
  - Religions: Buddhism; Christianity
- Time zone: UTC+6.30 (MMT)

Loikaw (Burmese: လွိုင်ကော်မြို့, pronounced [lwã̀ɪɰ.kɔ̀ mjo̰]), also Thiridaw (Western Kayah: ꤞꤤꤚꤤꤘꤢꤪ꤭, pronounced [ʂi˦.ri˦.dɔ˧]), is the largest town and the capital of Karenni State, in Myanmar. It is located in the Karen Hills area, near the State's northern tip, just above an embayment on the Pilu River. The inhabitants are mostly Kayah, Bamar and Shan). Myanmar's largest hydropower plant (built by the Japanese as war reparation) is located about 20 km (12 mi) east of Loikaw near the town of Lawpita.

The town of Loikaw comprises 23 urban wards.

== History ==
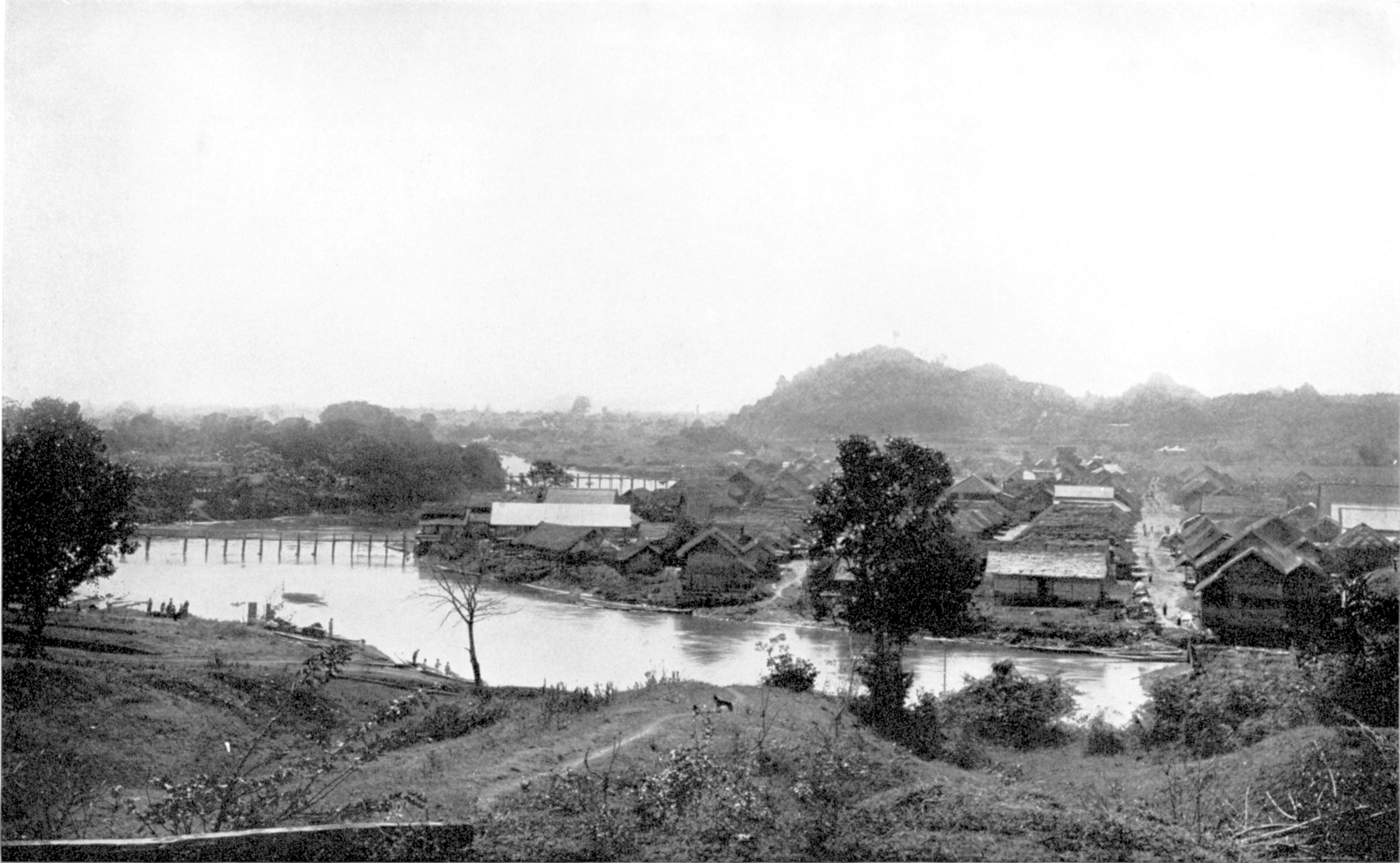
Landscape of Loikaw in 1922. The bridges appear flimsy, but were substantial enough that elephants could walk over them.

According to the Ministry of Home Affairs, a village near the Taungkwe hill was established by someone named U Thiri in 1838 and named Thiridaw. The village became known as Loikhaw in the Shan language. It later became known as Lweikaw and then eventually Loikaw. In 1888, the Sawphya (chieftain) of Kandarawadi established the Kandarawadi Palace in Loikaw, moving the capital of the state to Loikaw.

Loikaw was the Headquarters of the Political Officer in Charge of the Karenni States, part of the Princely States of British Burma, in 1922 during British rule in Burma. The town was located in the only flat part of the Karenni area. In 1892 it numbered four huts. As an Agent of the British government he was exercising control over the local Karenni Rulers, being supervised by the Superintendent at Taunggyi. The headquarters of the American Baptist Mission to Hill Karens was also located in Loikaw.

As with the rest of Karenni State, outsider access to Loikaw has been restricted post-independence, with special permits required to secure entry. Since the 2021 coup, Loikaw has been the scene of intense fighting between the Burmese military and ethnic armed groups opposed to military control, forcing many of the city's residents to flee. On 7 November 2023, the Karenni National People's Liberation Front, Karenni Army, and Karenni Nationalities Defence Force launched a military offensive known as Operation 1107 against the ruling State Administration Council junta. An additional offensive, known as Operation 1111, started on 11 November 2023 with the aim of capturing Loikaw. By 18 December, anti-junta forces were reported to have control of 85% of the city.

== Demographics ==
Historical Population
Year	Pop.	±%
1973		—
1983	33,665	—
2014	51,349	+52.5%
2019	59,450	+15.8%
2026	63,694	+7.1%
Source: Ministry of Labor, Immigration, and Population and General Administration Department data

The 2014 Myanmar Census reported that Loikaw had a population of 51,349, constituting 40.0% of Loikaw Township's total population. As of 2026, the town's population grew to 63,694 people, becoming 51.1% of the township's population.

The town and its surrounding areas (excluding the other towns in Loikaw Township) is ethnically 39.9% Karenni (Kayah), 31.6% Bamar, 19.9% Shan and 4.0% Karen.

== Climate ==
Loikaw has a tropical savanna climate (Köppen Aw) bordering on a humid subtropical climate (Cwa).

Climate data for Loikaw, elevation 895 m (2,936 ft), (1991–2020)
Month	Jan	Feb	Mar	Apr	May	Jun	Jul	Aug	Sep	Oct	Nov	Dec	Year
Mean daily maximum °C (°F)	27.7 (81.9)	30.2 (86.4)	32.8 (91.0)	33.8 (92.8)	31.3 (88.3)	29.1 (84.4)	28.2 (82.8)	28.0 (82.4)	28.8 (83.8)	28.8 (83.8)	28.0 (82.4)	26.7 (80.1)	29.4 (84.9)
Daily mean °C (°F)	18.6 (65.5)	20.7 (69.3)	24.0 (75.2)	26.5 (79.7)	26.1 (79.0)	25.0 (77.0)	24.5 (76.1)	24.3 (75.7)	24.6 (76.3)	23.9 (75.0)	21.5 (70.7)	18.8 (65.8)	23.2 (73.8)
Mean daily minimum °C (°F)	9.5 (49.1)	11.2 (52.2)	15.2 (59.4)	19.3 (66.7)	20.8 (69.4)	21.0 (69.8)	20.8 (69.4)	20.7 (69.3)	20.5 (68.9)	19.1 (66.4)	15.1 (59.2)	10.9 (51.6)	17.0 (62.6)
Average precipitation mm (inches)	9.3 (0.37)	2.7 (0.11)	14.1 (0.56)	41.1 (1.62)	139.9 (5.51)	142.1 (5.59)	155.6 (6.13)	226.5 (8.92)	191.6 (7.54)	131.4 (5.17)	38.4 (1.51)	10.2 (0.40)	1,102.7 (43.41)
Average precipitation days (≥ 1.0 mm)	1.0	0.3	1.3	5.0	14.2	18.3	19.4	21.5	17.1	11.1	4.2	1.4	114.7
Source: World Meteorological Organization

== Transport ==
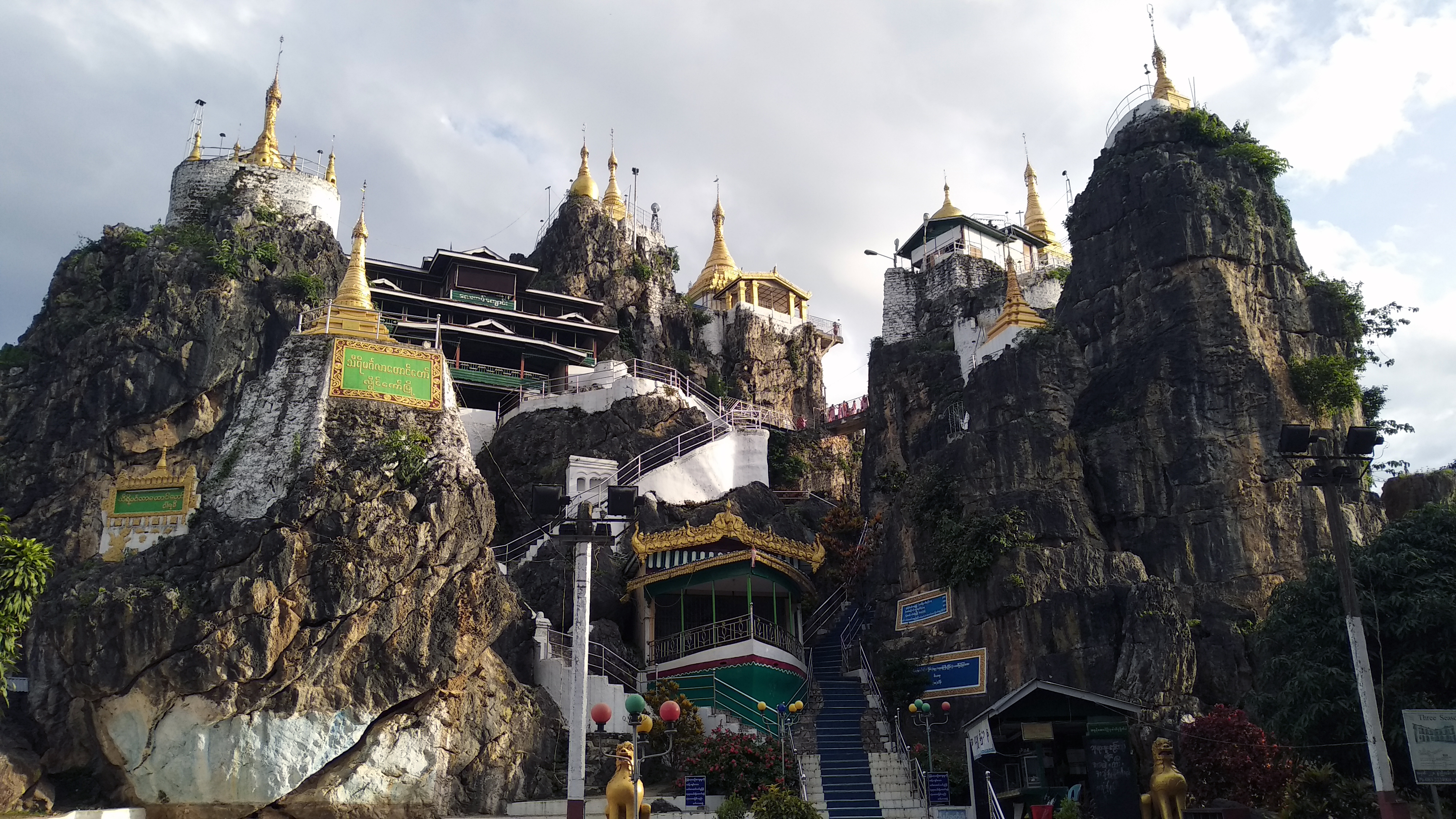
View of Taung Kwe Pagoda.

=== Air ===
The city (and the entire state) is served by Loikaw Airport, with flights to Yangon , Mandalay and Heho. Myanmar National Airlines offer a Yangon-Nay Pyi Taw-Loikaw flight as UB149

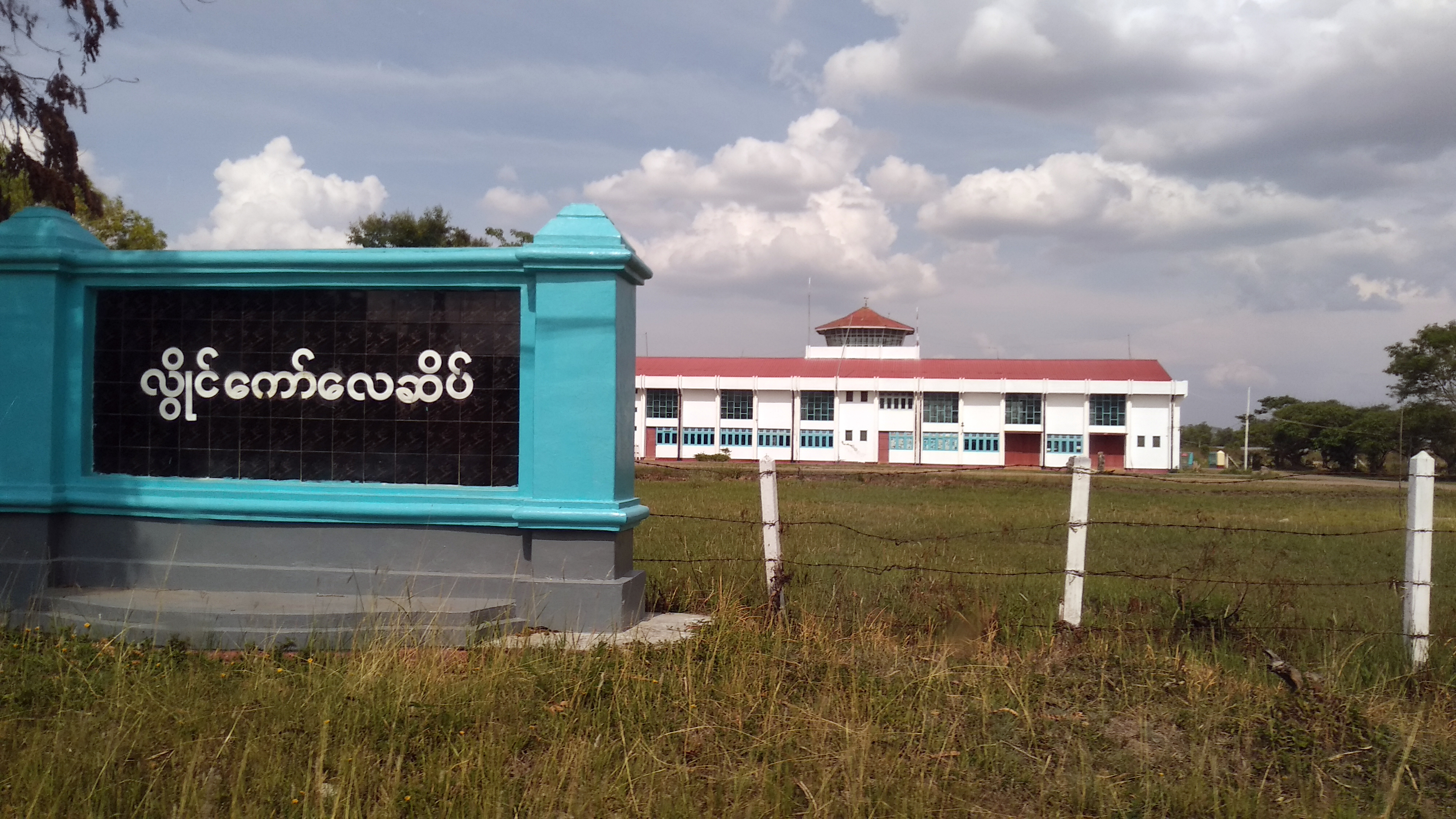
Loikaw Airport

=== Rail ===
Loikaw is linked by the newly constructed Aungpan-Pinlaung-Loikaw rail line.

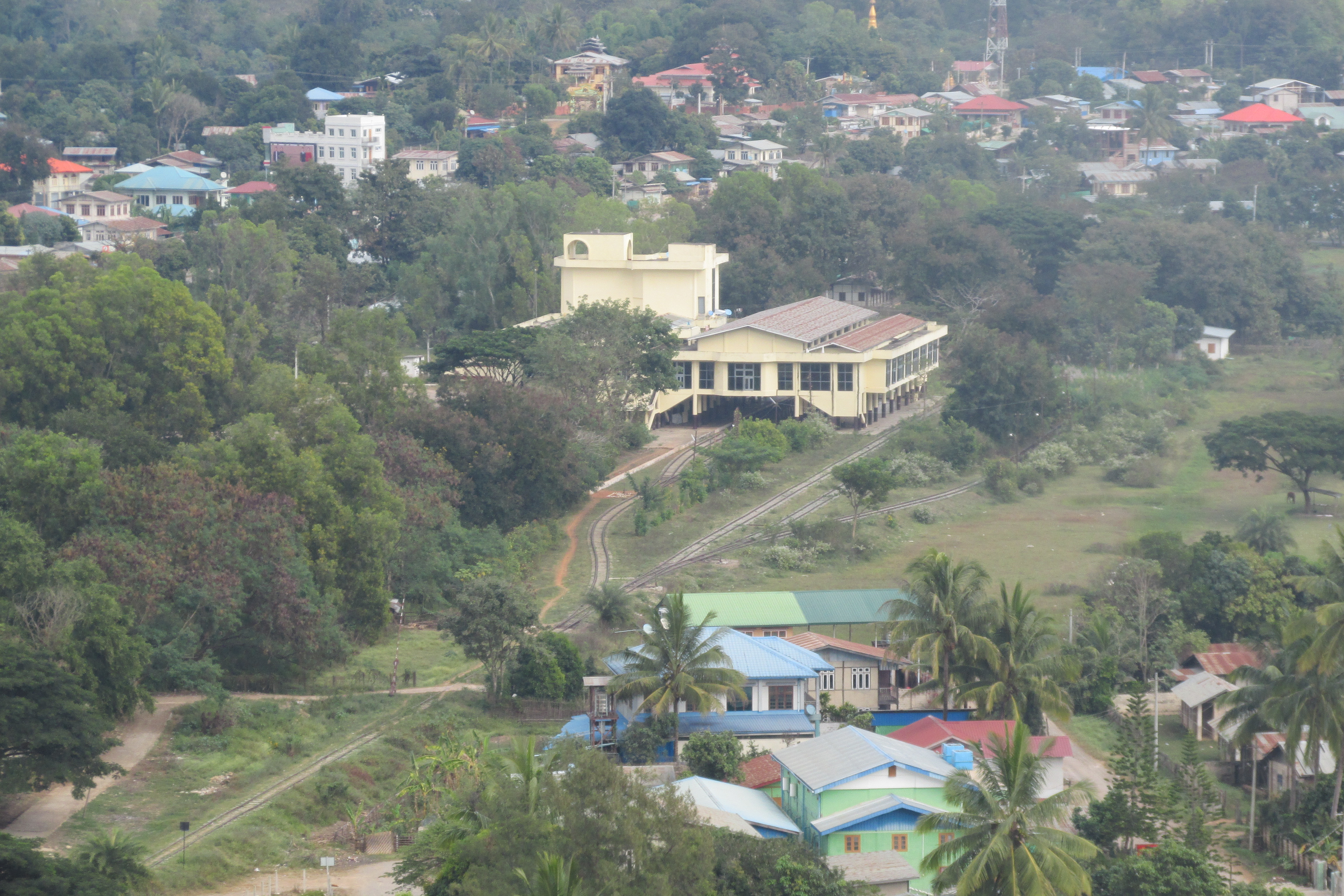
Loikaw Station

=== Buses ===
There are express buses from Loikaw to Yangon, Mandalay and other towns.

== Education ==
The town is home to Loikaw University, Technological University, Loikaw, Computer University, Loikaw, and Loikaw Education College.

== Health care ==
Loikaw General Hospital serves not only locals in the state but also to those in the southern part of neighbouring Shan State. The existing buildings of the hospital were built in 1964. Due to increase demands, new two two-storey buildings were constructed with the 1.945 billion yen funding from Japan International Cooperation Agency (JICA).

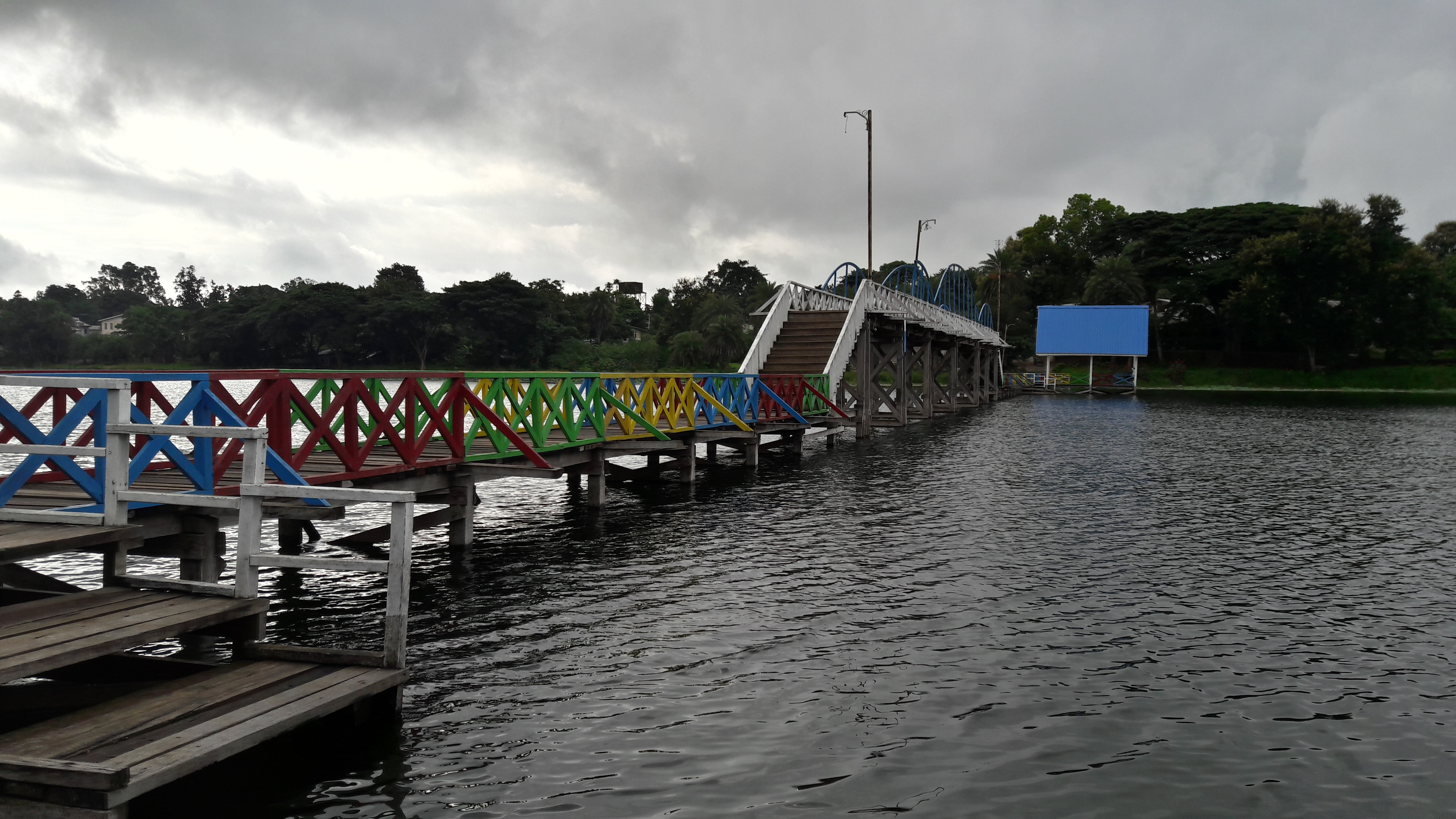
Naung Yah Lake

== Wards ==
In 2015, the town had 13 wards- namely Naungya, Daw-ukhu, Mainglon, Mingala, Dhammayon, Zaypaing, Shwetaung, Landama, Dawtanma, Dawnoeku, Shansu, and Minsu wards.

As of 2026, the General Administration Department reports that the town of Loikaw has 23 urban wards. However, the same report maps out 24 wards, highlighting 5 villages annexed into wards by the city alongside the 19 wards it had before. Listed below are Loikaw's 24 wards, with the newly annexed wards marked with a * symbol.

- Aung Thiha*
- Aye Ka Ngar Yar
- Bar Do*
- Daw-ukhu
- Dawnoeku
- Dawtanma
- Dhammaryon
- Htay Ngha Hlar*
- Htay Tha Ma
- Law Da Ma
- Mainglon
- Mingala
- Minsu
- Myay Ni Gone*
- Nam Bam Wan (Ka)
- Nam Bam Wan (Kha)
- Nant Kut
- Nar Nat Taw
- Naungya (Ka)
- Naungya (kha)
- Shansu
- Shwetaung
- Ywa Tan Shae*
- Zaypaing

== Notable People ==
- Aung Kyaw Soe - Amyotha Hluttaw Member of Parliament (2016-present)
- Marwi - Karenni Nationalities Defence Force Deputy Commander-in-Chief (2021-present)
- Mauk Kham Wah - Filmmaker and military officer
- Poe Rei Aung Thein - Member of the National Defence and Security Council
- Yan Kyaw Htwe - footballer for Dagon Star United F.C.

== See also ==
- Kayah State Cultural Museum
- Kandarawadi Palace
- Karen State
