= Taung Kwe Pagoda =

Pagoda in Kayah State, Myanmar

- တောင်ကွဲစေတီ
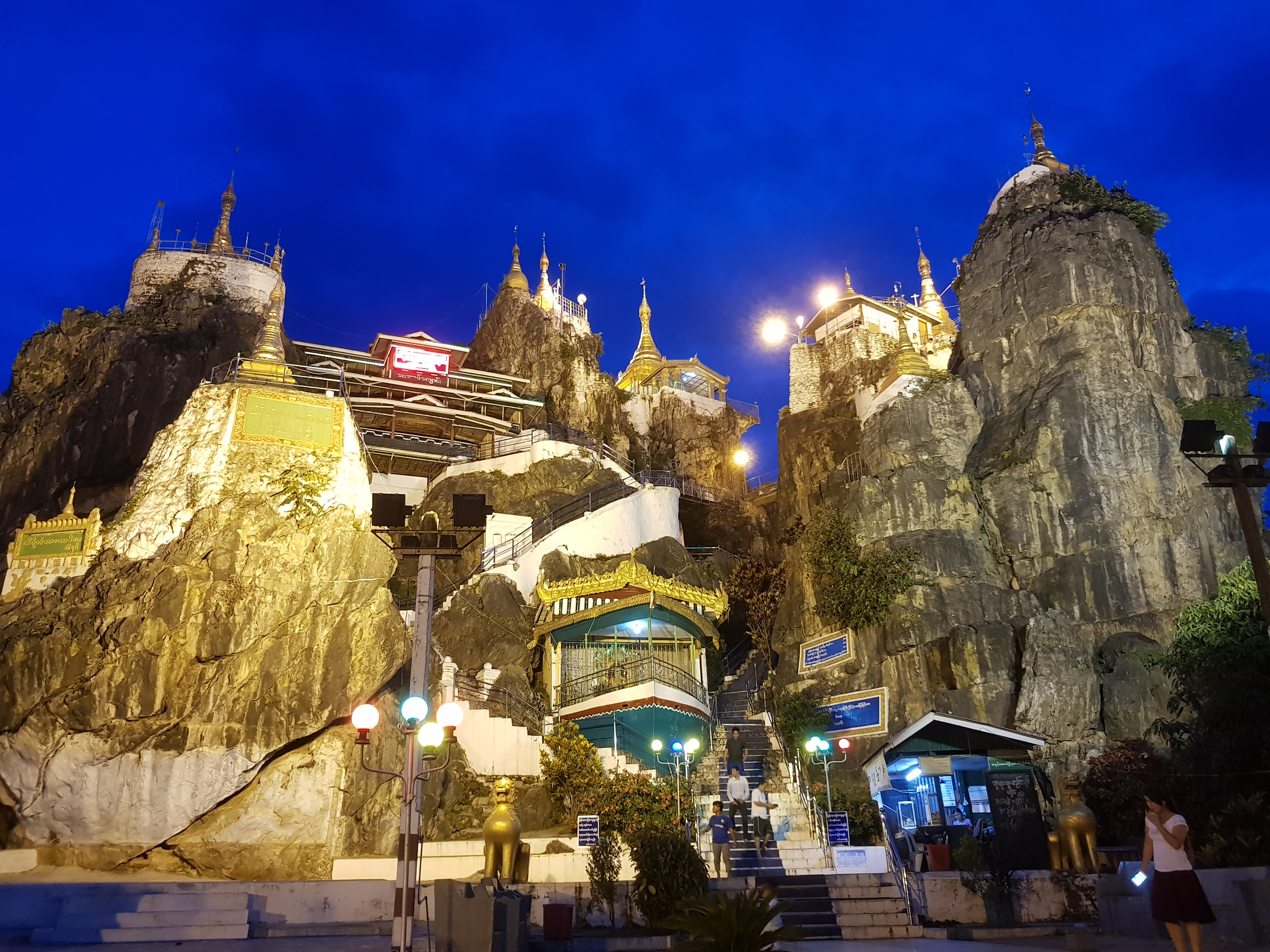
- Taung Kwe Pagodas

- Location within Myanmar

Religion
- Affiliation: Buddhism
- Region: Kayah State
- Status: active

Location
- Country: Myanmar
- Coordinates: 19.667468°N 97.208059°E

Architecture
- Established: 1900s

Sri Mingala Taung Taw ; commonly referred to as Taung Kwe Zedi (Burmese: သီရိမင်္ဂလာတောင်တော် (တောင်ကွဲစေတီ)) is a pagoda located in Loikaw city, Kayah State, Myanmar. It is also regarded as Buddhist Disneyland for similar vibes. The name "Taung Kwe" translates to "broken mountain". It is a natural mountain with 12 pagodas made on 9 different mountain peaks. The first pagoda was established in the 19th century by the ruler of Loikaw.

== Origin ==
The pagoda is built above the mountains in the region. Taung Kwe Mountain stands about 387 feet high and is formed by nine natural rocky peaks. The mountain was originally associated with Thiri Daw, a town founded by U Thiri, and was therefore called Thiri Mountain or Mingala Thiri Mountain. Since 1970, the pagodas built on the mountain have officially been known as the Thiri Mingala Taung Taw Pagoda. However, because of its appearance, people from different regions commonly know it as Taung Kwe Pagoda. In the Shan language it is called "Loi Hpa Tat", while in the Kayah language it is known as "Phaw Phe".

=== Incidents ===
During the COVID-19 pandemic, due to the large number of pilgrims visiting the place, many visitors were not following the health guidelines such as wearing masks and washing hands. Hence the pagoda entrances and exits were closed on August 3, 2020 and warnings were issued.

During the Myanmar civil war, the pagoda was damaged due to being hit by a junta shelling strike.

== Features ==
There are twelve pagodas in the mountain collectively which and their construction years are listed below:

1. Shwe Yat Taung Pagoda — 1895
2. Shwe Yin Aye Pagoda — 1913
3. Kyauk Thamban — 1914
4. Aung Taw Mu Pagoda — 1929
5. Su Taung Pyi Pagoda — 1929
6. Pyi Lone Chan Thar Pagoda — 1933
7. Lower Kyaiktiyo Pagoda — 1933
8. Upper Kyaiktiyo Pagoda — 1934
9. Shwe Pyi Aye Pagoda — 1950
10. Zeyar Thi Dhi Pagoda — 1992
11. Kandarawaddy Pagoda — 1994
12. Shwe Pi Tone Pagoda — 1992

According to a local Buddhist prophecy, Taung Kwe Pagoda and eight nearby pagodas are believed to one day unite into a single sacred pagoda for an enlightenment.

== Gallery ==
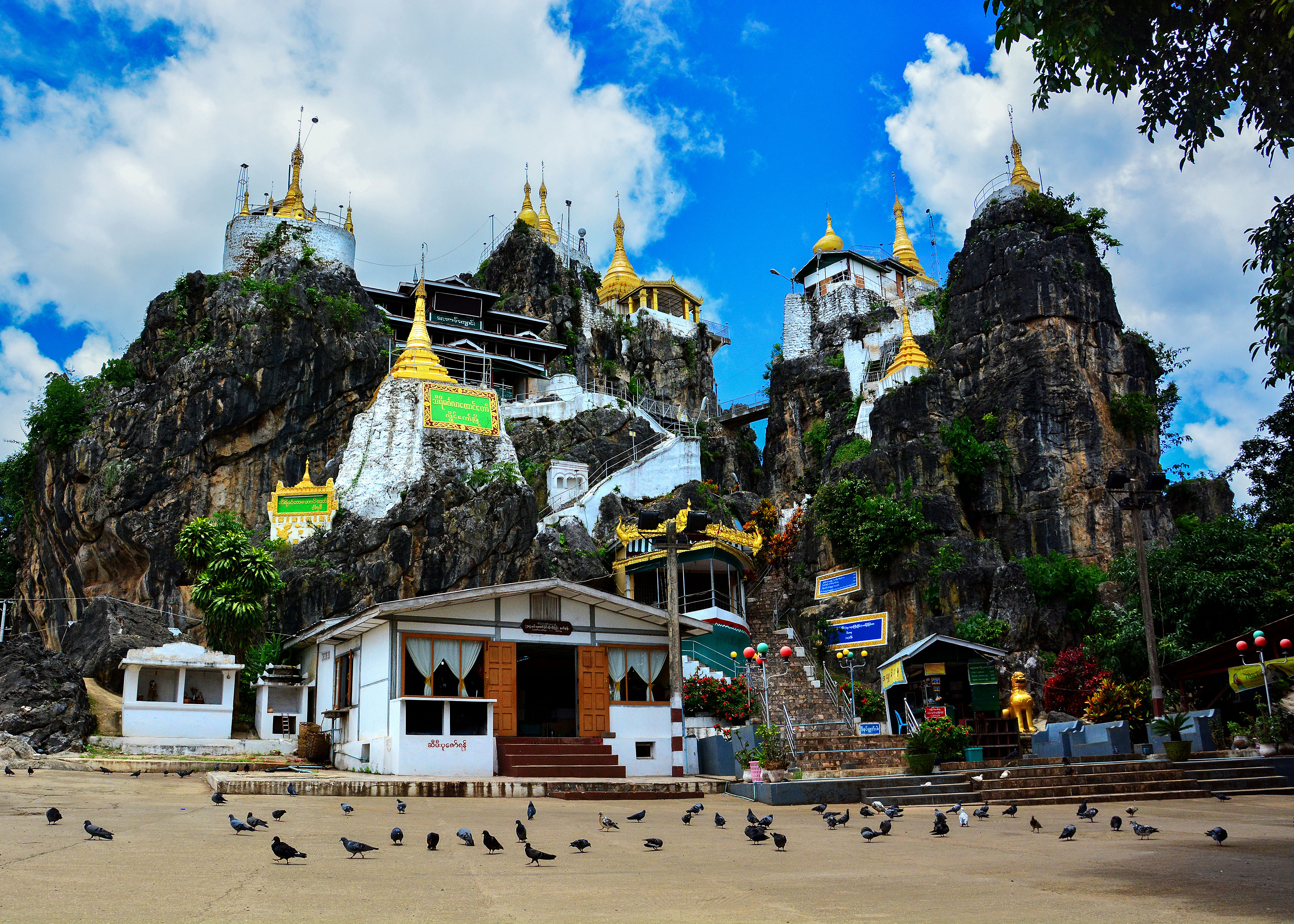

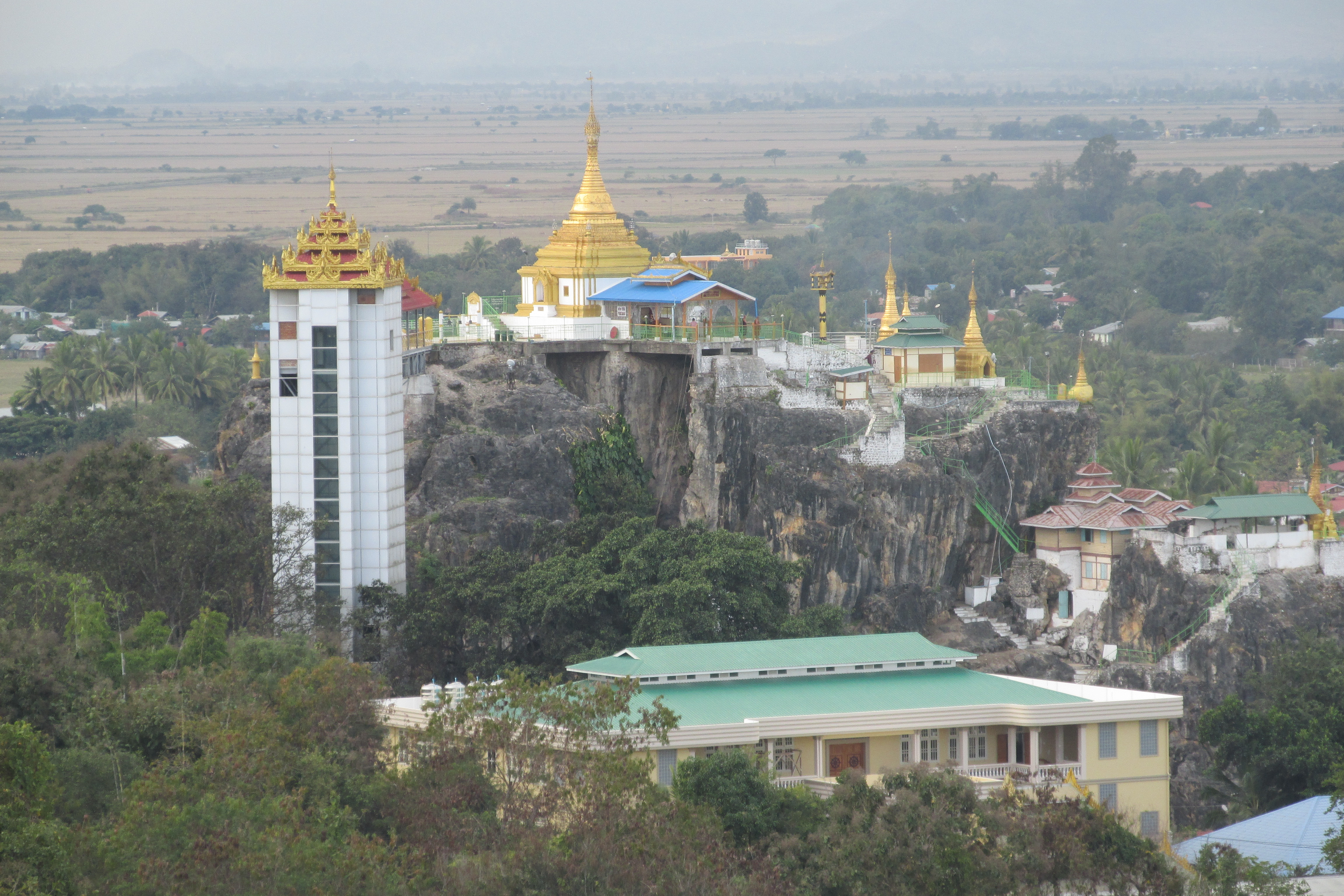

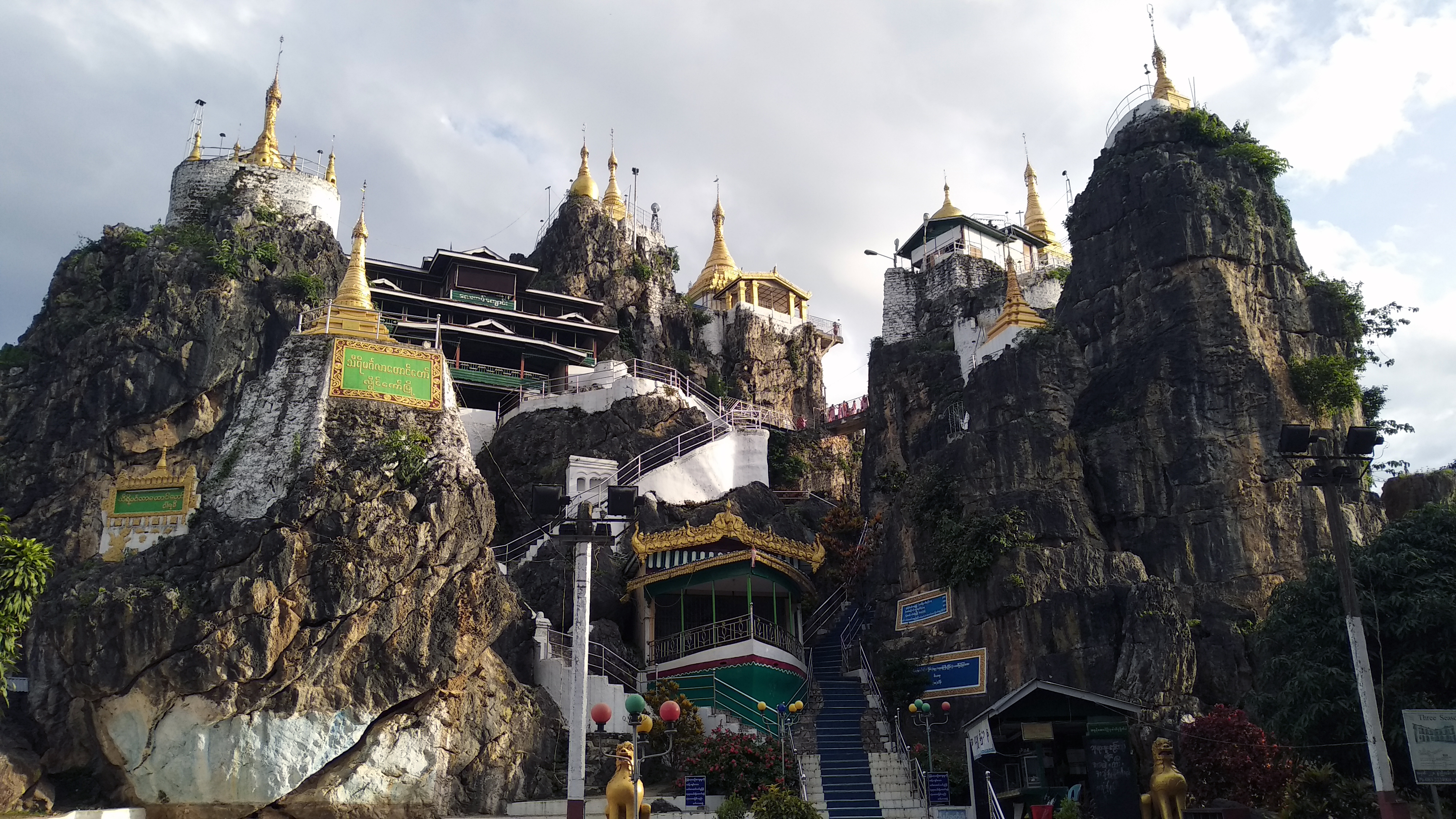

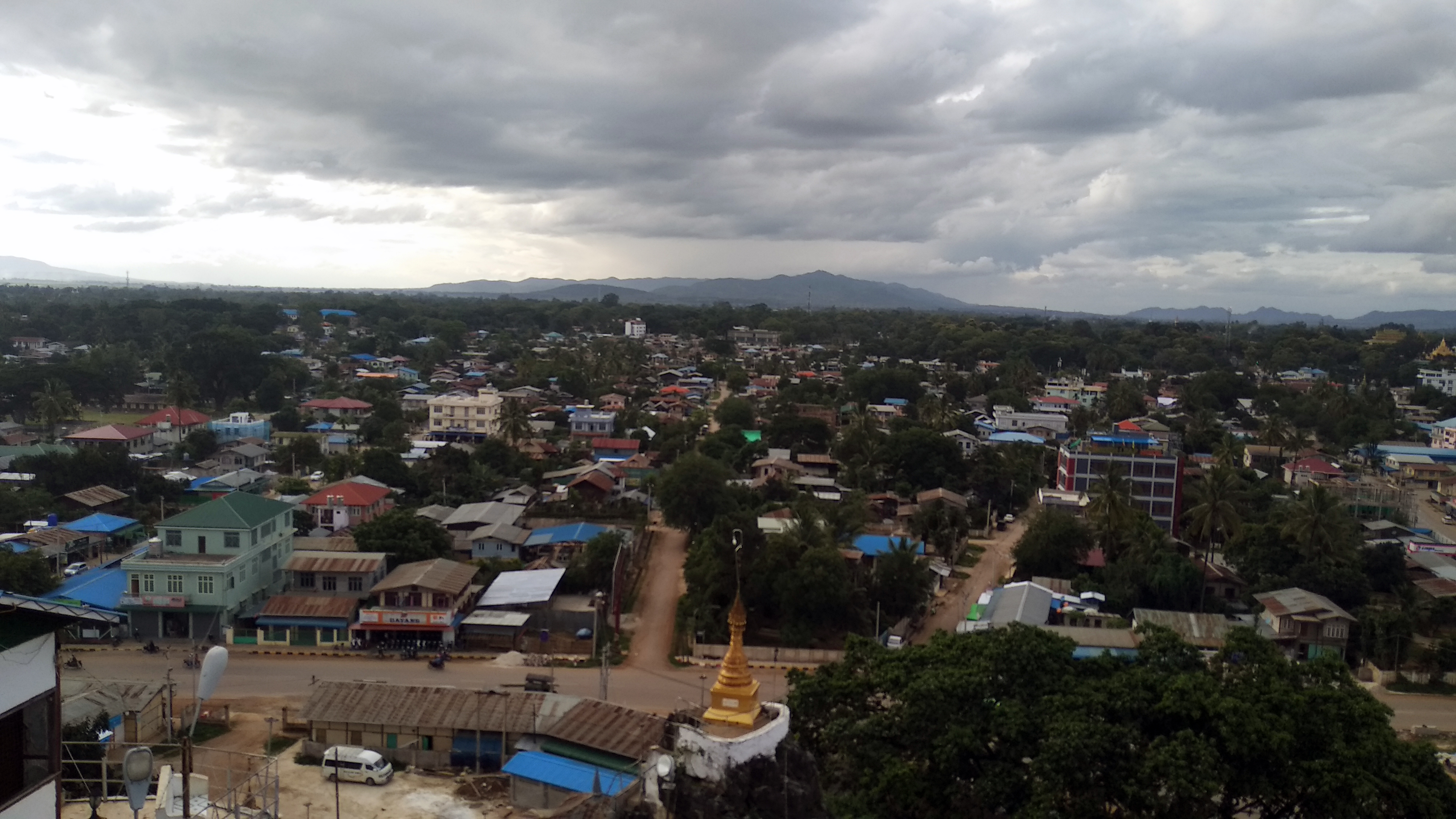
View of Loikaw from the pagoda top
