= Poe Rei Aung Thein =

Kayah politician

Sithu Poe Rei Aung Thein
- ပိုးရယ်အောင်သိန်း

Member of the Central Advisory Body of the National Defence and Security Council
- In office 31 July 2025 – 10 April 2026
- President: Min Aung Hlaing (Acting)
- Leader: Saw Tun Aung Myint (Head of Advisory Body)
- Preceded by: Position established

Member of the State Administration Council
- In office 1 February 2023 – 31 July 2025
- Leader: Min Aung Hlaing
- Preceded by: Council established
- Succeeded by: Council dissolved

Member of the House of Nationalities
- In office 30 March 2011 – 30 March 2016
- Preceded by: Constitution implemented
- Succeeded by: Dr. Khin Ma Gyi (NLD)
- Constituency: Kayah State No. 8

Personal details
- Born: May 3, 1953 (age 73) Loikaw Township, Kayah State, Burma
- Party: Union Solidarity and Development Party
- Parent(s): U Soe Rei (father); Daw Soe Mya (mother)
- Occupation: Politician
- Awards: Sithu(2025)

Poe Rei Aung Thein (Burmese: ပိုးရယ်အောင်သိန်း; born 3 May 1953), also Poe Reh Aung Thein, is a Kayah politician who served as a member of the Central Advisory Body of the National Defence and Security Council (Myanmar) (NDSC) from July 2025 to April 2026. He previously served as a member of the State Administration Council (SAC) from 2023 to 2025 and was a Member of Parliament in the House of Nationalities from 2011 to 2016.

== Early life ==
Poe Rei Aung Thein was born on 3 May 1953, in Htay Thama Village, Loikaw Township, Kayah State to parents U Soe Rei and Daw Soe Mya. He completed his high school education (Grade 10).

== Political career ==
He entered politics during the 2010 Myanmar general election, representing the Union Solidarity and Development Party (USDP). He was elected as an MP for Kayah State Constituency No. 8 in the House of Nationalities (Amyotha Hluttaw).

After completing his five-year term in 2016, he did not contest the 2015 election but continued to serve the USDP as a member of the Central Executive Committee and as the Chairman of the Kayah State party branch. He contested the 2020 Myanmar general election for Kayah State Constituency No. 11 but was unsuccessful.

== SAC and NDSC membership ==
Following the reorganization of the State Administration Council (SAC) on 1 February 2023, Poe Rei Aung Thein was appointed as a member of the council.

On 31 July 2025, upon the dissolution of the SAC, he was appointed to the newly formed Central Advisory Body of the National Defence and Security Council under Order No. 10/2025.

== International sanctions ==
In 2023, Poe Rei Aung Thein was sanctioned by the United States, the European Union, and Switzerland for his role in the military government following the 2021 Myanmar coup d'état.

== Honors ==
On 17 April 2025, he was awarded the Sithu (Order of the Union of Myanmar) by Senior General Min Aung Hlaing for his service to the state.
