= Kayah State Cultural Museum =

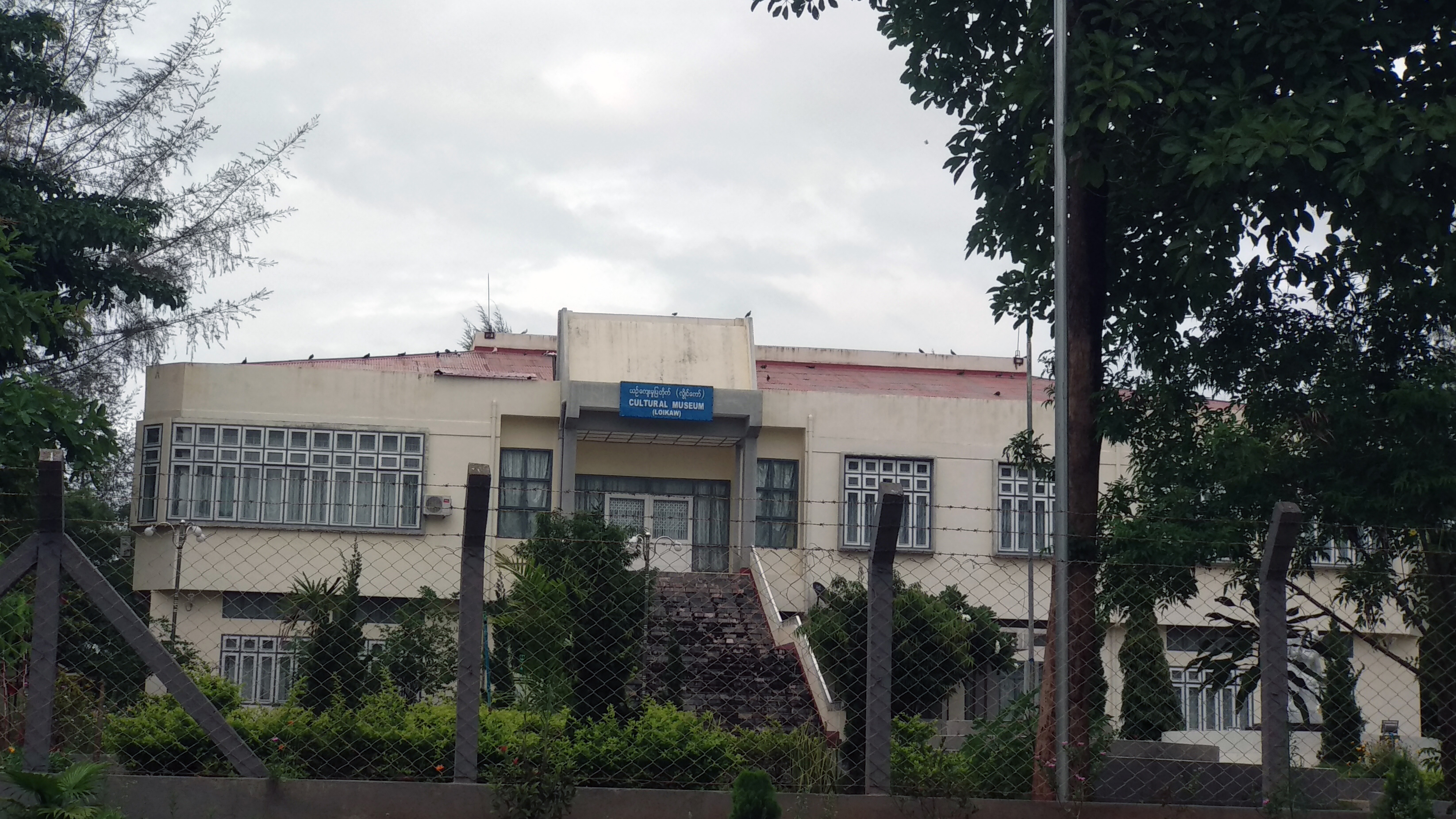
- Established: 11 September 1996; 29 years ago
- Location: Loikaw, Kayah State, Myanmar
- Coordinates: 19.6926°N 97.2089°E
- Type: Cultural Museum
- Owner: Ministry of Religious Affairs and Culture (Myanmar)

The Kayah State Cultural Museum is a museum in Loikaw, Kayah State in Myanmar that display bronze drums used at weddings and funerals, stone beads, household utensils, traditional looms, traditional dresses, silverware, weapons, paintings and musical instruments of the Kayah people. The museum holds nearly 13,000 books and 405 individual objects.

It was established on September 18, 1996.
