= List of administrative divisions of Myanmar by Human Development Index =

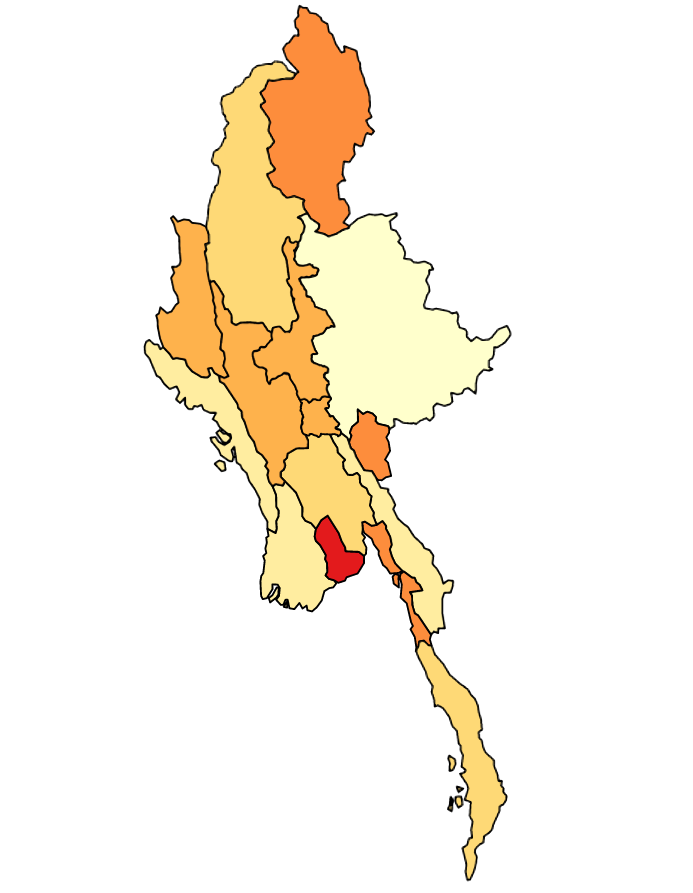
Administrative divisions of Myanmar by HDI in 2018.665-.645.644-.625.624-.605.604-.585.584-.565.564-.545.524-.505

This is a list of administrative divisions of Myanmar by Human Development Index as of 2023 with data for the year 2022.

Rank	Region	HDI (2022)
Medium human development
1	Yangon	0.697
2	Kachin	0.651
3	Mon	0.634
4	Kayah	0.631
5	Mandalay with Naypyidaw	0.626
6	Chin	0.614
7	Magway	0.610
–	Myanmar (average)	0.608
8	Tanintharyi	0.606
9	Bago	0.600
10	Sagaing	0.597
11	Ayeyarwady	0.581
12	Kayin	0.579
13	Rakhine	0.566
Low human development
14	Shan	0.529

== See also ==
- List of countries by Human Development Index
