= Computer University, Loikaw =

University in Kayah State, Myanmar

Coordinates: 19.6965°N 97.2210°E

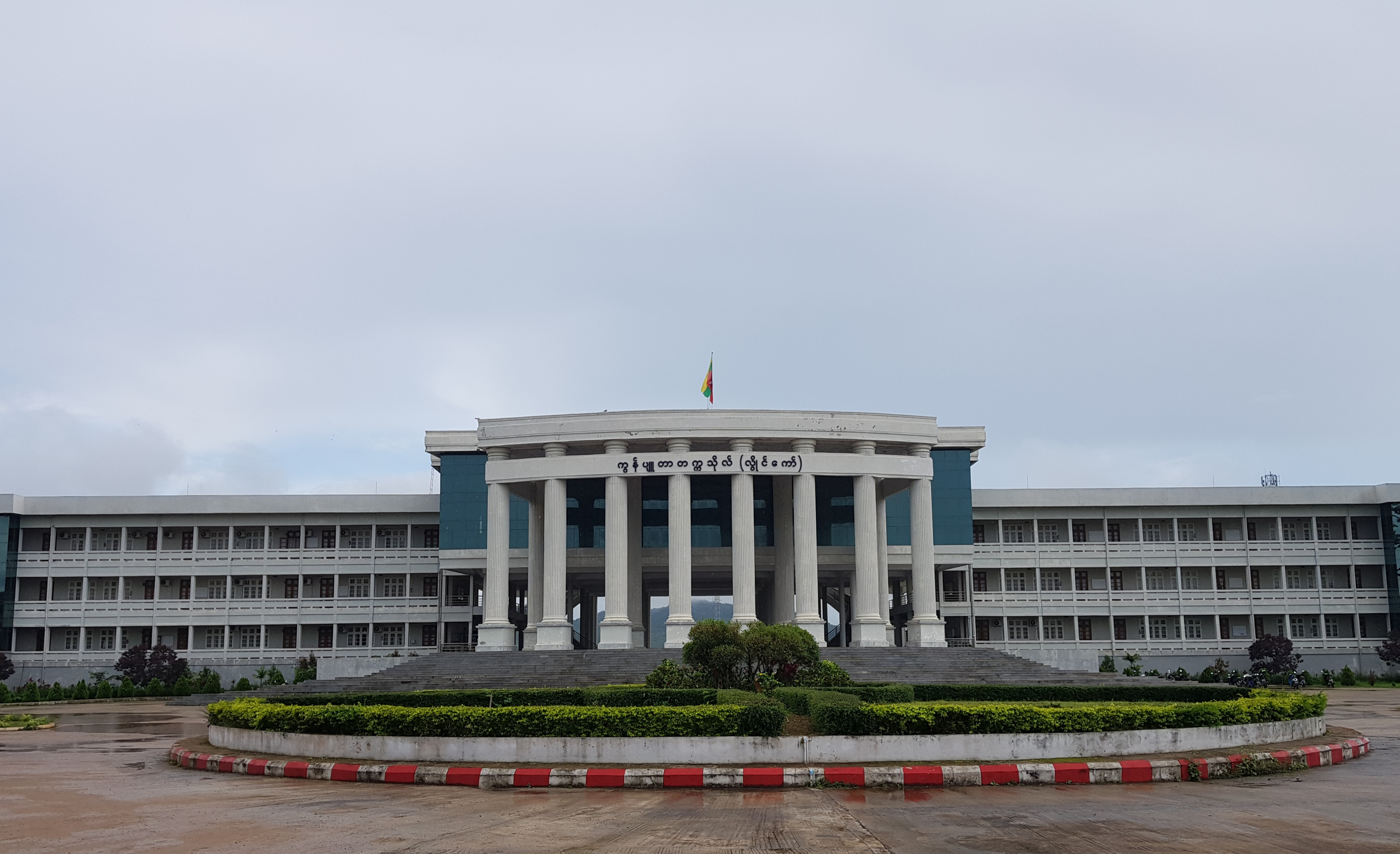
- Established: 20 January 2007; 19 years ago
- Principal: Aung Myint Aye
- Location: Loikaw, Kayah State, Burma

Computer University, Loikaw is a public university in Loikaw, Kayah State, Myanmar. It is located near the Loikaw Airport. It was founded as the Government Computer College on February 21, 2001, and became a university on January 20, 2007.

== Academic departments ==
- Faculty of Software Department
- Faculty of Hardware Department
- Faculty of Information Science Department
- Myanmar Department
- English Department

== Programs ==
=== Postgraduate ===
Level	Degree	Duration
Bachelor of Computer Science (Honors),	(B.C.Sc) (Hons:)	4-yrs
Bachelor of Computer Technology (Honors)	(B.C.Tech) (Hons:)	4-yrs
Master of Information Science	(M.I.Sc)	2 yrs Students must have completed and obtained D.C.Sc.
Diploma of Computer Science	(D.C.Sc)	1-yrs

=== Graduate degrees ===
Level	Degree	Duration
Bachelor of Computer Science	(B.C.Sc)	3-yrs
Bachelor of Computer Technology	(B.C.Tech)	3-yrs

=== Undergraduate program ===
Level	Degree	Duration
Basic Computer Application Course	Certificate	8-months
