= Loikaw University =

Technology university in Loikaw, Myanmar

- လွိုင်ကော်တက္ကသိုလ်
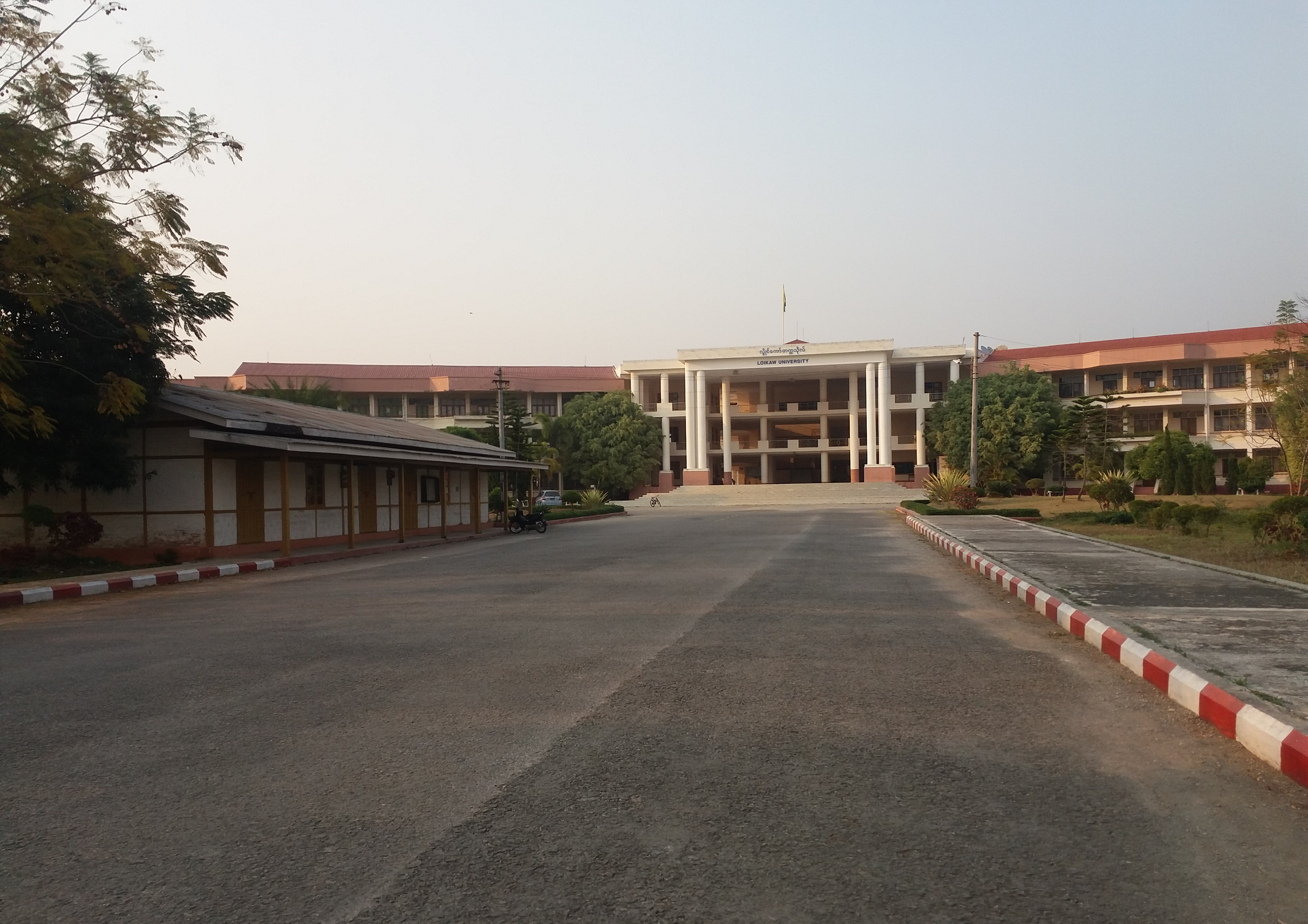
- Type: Public
- Established: 30 July 1982; 44 years ago
- Location: Loikaw, Kayah State, Myanmar; 19.694°N 97.198°E

Loikaw University (Burmese: လွိုင်ကော်တက္ကသိုလ်) is a public university in Loikaw Township, Kayah State, Myanmar.

== History ==
In 2014, along with other Burmese universities, Loikaw University engaged in research to preserve the Thanlwin river. The department of geology also uncovered two trilobite species from the Taungnyo area dating back to the carboniferous. In 2023 during the civil war, the university was converted into a military base by the Tatmadaw to defend against rebel incursions into the city. In Operation 1107 it was captured by the KNDF after two days of fighting.

== See also ==
- List of universities in Myanmar
