= Kayah State =

State of Myanmar

Kayah State ကယားပြည်နယ်
- State

Myanma transcription(s)
  - Burmese: ka. ya: prany nai
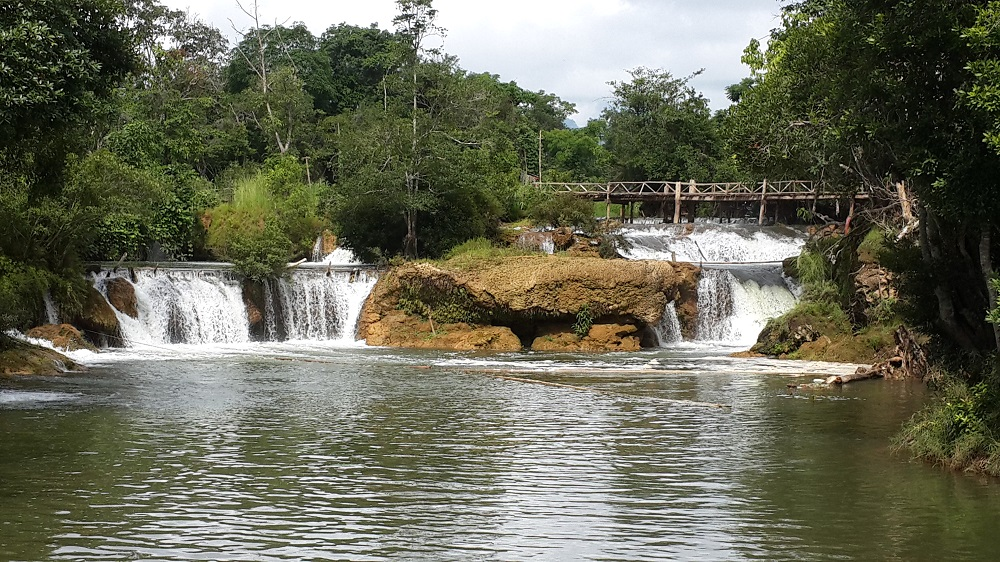
- Htee Zai Kha waterfall, border of Shan and Kayah State

- Flag Emblem

- Location of Kayah State in Myanmar
- Coordinates: 19°15′N 97°20′E
- Country: Myanmar
- Region: Upper
- Before becoming State: Part of Federated Shan States
- Establishment: 4 January 1948
- Direct rule by the Government: 1 October 1959
- Capital: Loikaw

Government
  - Chief Minister: Arnt Maw
  - Cabinet: Kayah State Government
  - Legislature: Kayah State Hluttaw
  - Judiciary: Kayah State High Court

Area
  - Total: 11,731.5 km^{2} (4,529.6 sq mi)
  - Rank: 13th
- Highest elevation (Nattaung): 2,623 m (8,606 ft)

Population (2018)
  - Total: 400,000
  - Rank: 15th
  - Density: 34/km^{2} (88/sq mi)
- Demonym(s): Kayah, Karenni

Demographics
  - Ethnicities: Kayah, Kayan, Kayaw, Bamar, Karen, Shan, Pa-O
  - Religions: Buddhism 49.9% Christianity 45.8% Animism 1.9% Islam 1.1% Hinduism 0.1% Other Religion 1.2%
- Time zone: UTC+06:30 (MST)
- HDI (2017): 0.585 medium · 3rd
- Website: www.kayahstate.gov.mm

Kayah State (Burmese: ကယားပြည်နယ်, pronounced [kəjá pjìnɛ̀]), or Karenni State, is a state of Myanmar. Situated in eastern Myanmar, it is bounded on the north by Shan State, on the east by Thailand's Mae Hong Son Province, and on the south and west by Kayin State. It lies approximately between 18° 30′ and 19° 55′ north latitude and between 96° 50′ and 97° 50′ east longitude. The area is 11,670 km^{2} (4,510 sq mi). Its capital is Loikaw (also spelt Loi-kaw). The estimated population in the 2014 Myanmar Census was 286,738, the smallest among Myanmar's seven states. It is inhabited primarily by the Karenni ethnic group, also known as Red Karen or Kayah, a Sino-Tibetan people. Even though Kayah State is the smallest state in Myanmar, it is still larger than Yangon Region.

== Geography ==
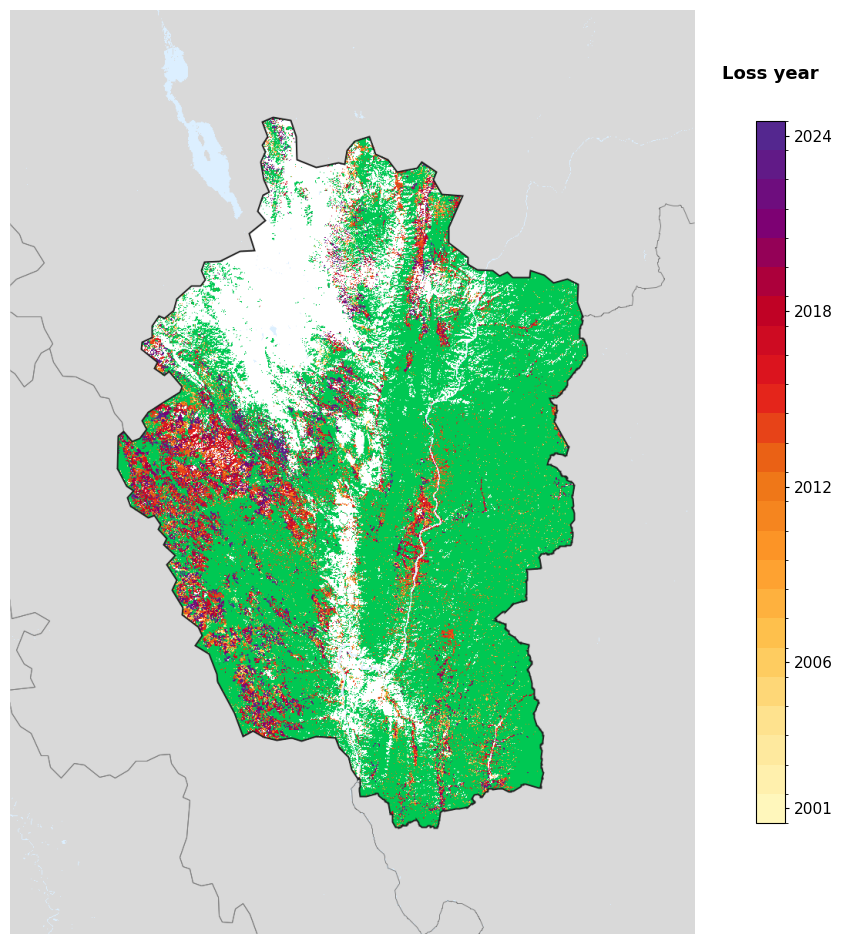
Tree-cover loss year in Kayah, 2001-2024, from the Global Forest Change dataset.

Karenni (Kayah) State is located in the eastern part of Myanmar. The relief of Karenni (Kayah) State is mountainous with the Dawna Range and the Karen Hills also known as "Karenni-Karen" mountains separated by the Salween River as it flows through Karenni (Kayah) State. Balu Chaung flows from Inle Lake to Than Lwin River and converges with the Salween in southern Karenni (Kayah) State.

Lawpita Dam, built in 1950 as a bilateral reparation agreement with Japan, is a major hydroelectric production dam that produces a quarter of the total hydroelectric power generation in Myanmar.

== History ==
=== 19th century and British rule ===
Karenni States is the name formerly given to a group of states that included Kantarawadi, Kyebogyi and Bawlake. These states were located south of the Federated Shan States and east of British Burma. According to the 1930 census, the states had a total population of 58,761 with Kantarawadi (3,161 square miles or 8,190 square kilometres), 30,677, Kyebogyi (790 square miles or 2,000 square kilometres), 14,282 and Bawlake (568 square miles or 1,470 square kilometres), 13,802.

The British government recognised and guaranteed the independence of the Karenni States in an 1875 treaty June 21st with a Burmese King Mindon Min, by which both parties recognised the area as belonging neither to Konbaung Burma nor to Great Britain. Consequently, the Karenni States were never fully incorporated into British Burma. The Karenni States were recognised as tributary to British Burma in 1892, when their rulers agreed to accept a stipend from the British government. In the 1930s, the Mawchi Mine in Bawlake was the most important source of tungsten in the world.

=== Independence to 1988 ===
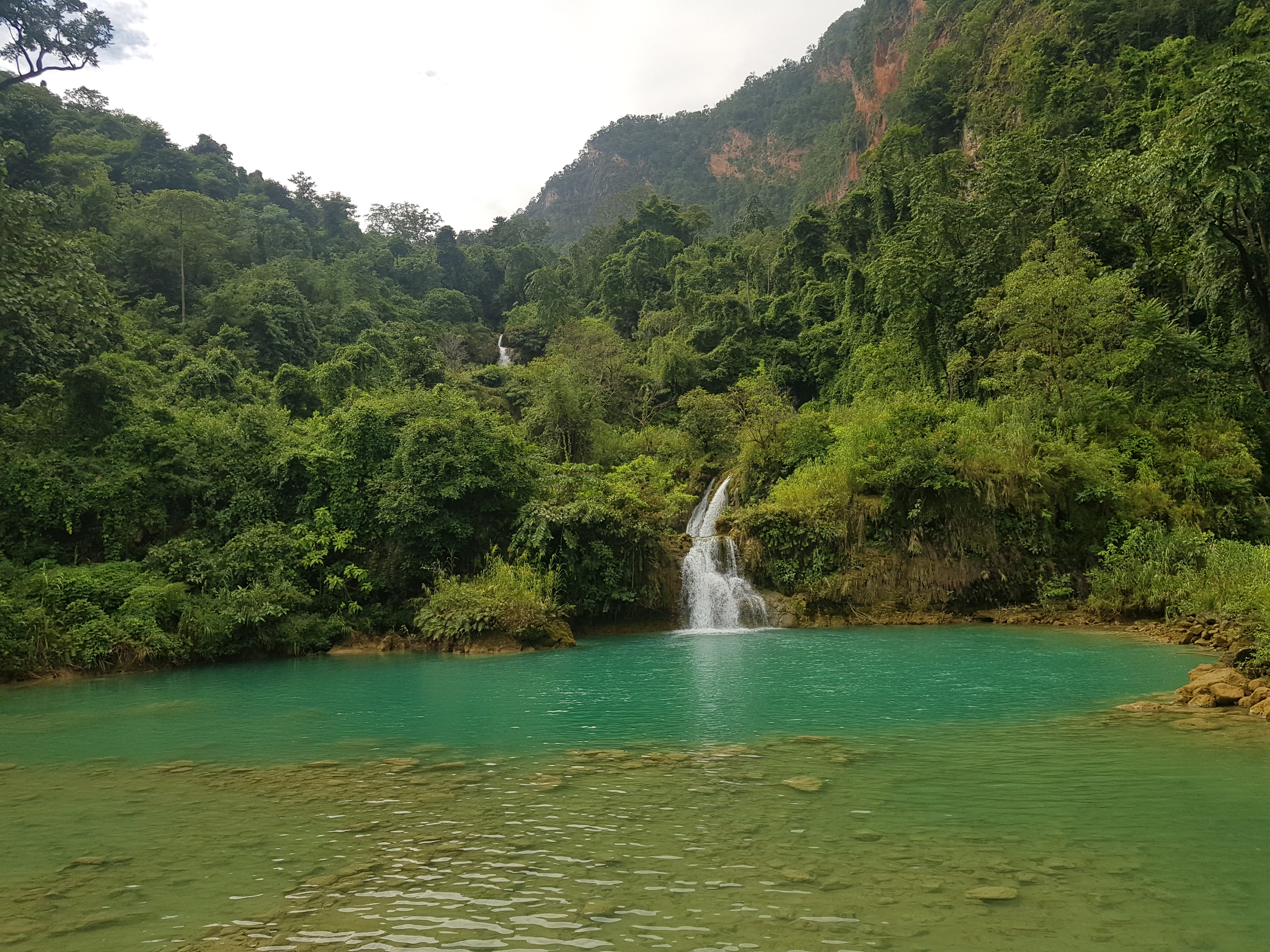
Lawpita Waterfall

The Constitution of the Union of Burma in 1947 proclaimed that the three Karenni States be amalgamated into a single constituent state of the union, called Karenni State. It also provided for the possibility of secession from the Union after 10 years.

After this the Bamar government invaded Karenni State and in 1948 August 9th, the Karenni leader U Bee Htu Re started the resistance against the Invading Bamar government and military dictatorship which continues till the present day to regain freedom, self-determination, and to allow Karenni people to live in peaceful harmony with the environment on their own land. Therefore, the 9th August is called "Karenni Resistance Day".

In September 8th 1948, the Karenni leader U Bee Htu Re was assassinated by central government militia for his opposition to the inclusion of the Karenni States in the Union of Burma. Therefore, the date of 8th September is called "Karenni Martyr's Day".

In 1952, the former Shan state of Mong Pai (1901. pop - 19,351) was added to Karenni State, and the whole renamed Kayah State, possibly with the intent of driving a wedge between the Karenni (in Kayah State) and the rest of the Karen people (in Karen State), both fighting for independence.

In 1957, pro-independence groups already active in the area formed the Karenni National Progressive Party (KNPP), backed by its own army, the Karenni Army (KA). Apart from a brief ceasefire in 1995, the KA has been fighting ever since. Rivals to the KNPP include the leftist Kayan New Land Party (KNLP), and the Karenni National People's Liberation Front (KNPLF), both of which are now allied with the Myanmar military.

=== 1988–2021 ===
In 1996, Myanmar's State Law and Order Restoration Council (SLORC) stepped up its campaign to crush Karenni independence with a population transfer program, forcibly moving villagers to designated relocation sites to deprive the pro-independence forces of bases of support. The Myanmar government has been accused of massive human rights violations in the region.

In June 2019, six young Karenni protesters were arrested after being sued by the Kayah State government for calling Chief Minister L Phaung Sho a "traitor" to Karennis due to a statue of Gen. Aung San being erected in Loikaw, the state capital.

In September 2020, Sho was impeached by the state's parliament and subsequently removed as chief minister by President Win Myint due to his misuse of state funds, with Boss Ko appointed as acting chief minister in his stead.

=== Post-2021 ===
In the context of the ongoing post-coup civil war, on 7 November 2023, the Karenni National People's Liberation Front, Karenni Army, and Karenni Nationalities Defence Force launched a military offensive known as Operation 1107 against the ruling State Administration Council junta. An additional offensive, known as Operation 1111, started on 11 November 2023 with the aim of capturing Loikaw. In an interview with The Irrawaddy on 28 November, the KNDF's deputy commander-in-chief Marwi (Burmese: မာဝီက) claimed that the anti-junta forces controlled 80% of Kayah state and had control over half of Loikaw, where an interim Karenni state government was being established to replace the junta installed state government which had collapsed.

== Demographics ==
Historical population
Year	Pop.	±%
1973	126,574	—
1983	168,429	+33.1%
2014	286,627	+70.2%
Source: 2014 Myanmar Census

In 2014, Kayah State had a population of 286,627.

=== Ethnic makeup ===
Ethnic composition of Kayah State
Ethnic group	Percentage
Karenni	61.3%
Bamar	14.8%
Shan	14.3%
Karen	7.8%
Other	1.7%
Mon	0.1%
Source: 2019 GAD township reports

The Karenni make up the majority of Kayah State's population, but significant minorities of Bamar, Shan and Karen also inhabit the state. The Shan, Intha, and Bamar live in the north and Pa-O in surrounding hills. Each group is also known by more than one name. Clearly, ethnicity in Kayah State is a complex issue, made more complex by decolonisation and post-independence politics. According to the 1983 census conducted by United Nations and the Burmese government, the Kayah State composed 56.12%, while Bamar (17.58%), Shan (16.66%), Karen (6.45%), mixed races (2.08%), and other groups formed minorities. Ethnolinguists distinguish the following linguistic groups in Kayah State:

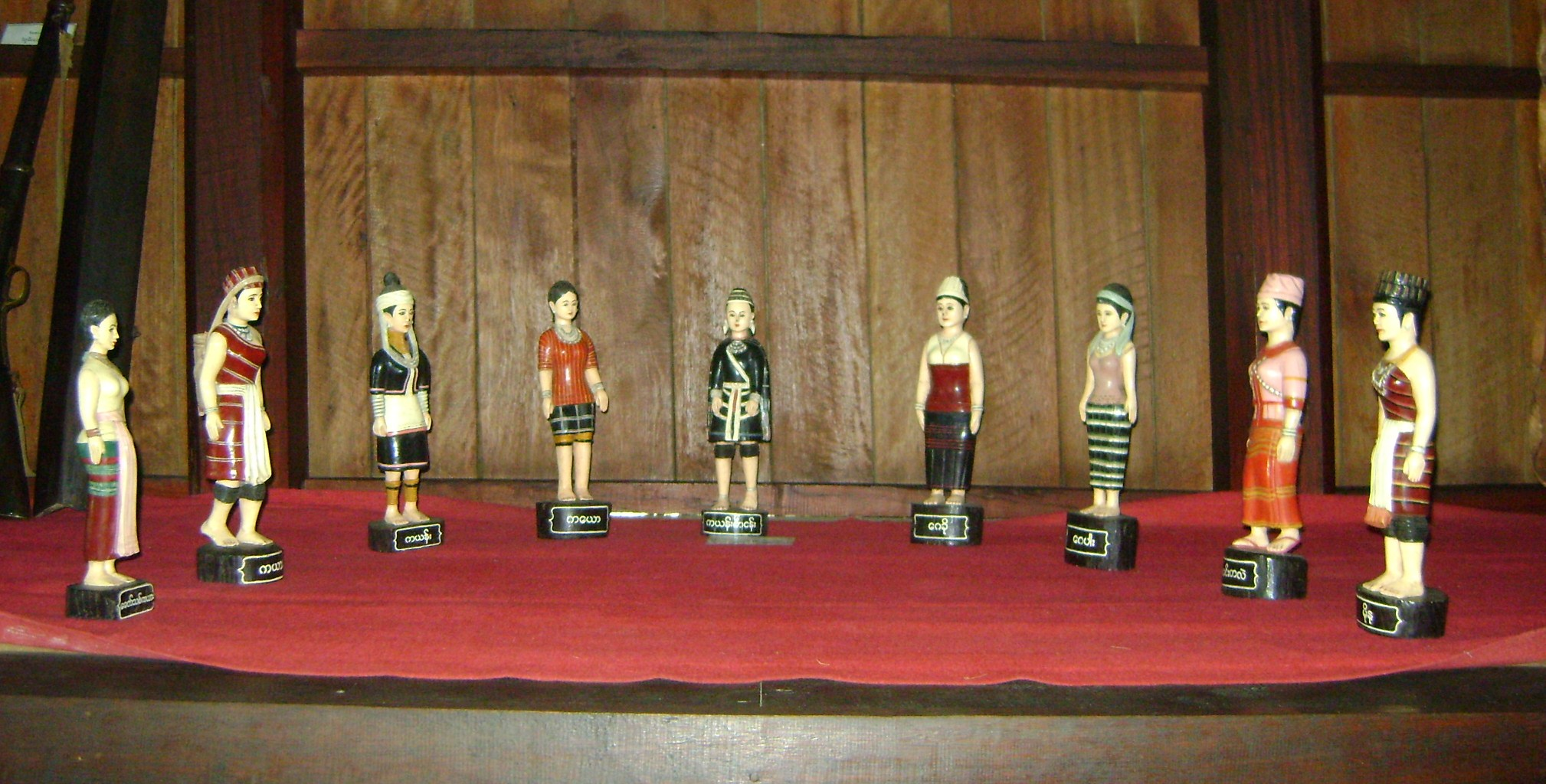
Figurines of nine of the subgroups of the Kayah.

1. Karenni/Kayah (Red Karen)
2. Padaung (Kayan)
3. Bwe
4. Geba
5. Manumanaw (Kayaw)
6. Yantale
7. Zayein (Kayăn Lahta)
8. Geko (Kayăn Kakhong)
9. Yinbaw (Kayăn Kangan)
10. Paku (Karen)

After the 2014 Census in Myanmar, the Burmese government indefinitely withheld release of detailed ethnicity data, citing concerns around political and social concerns surrounding the issue of ethnicity in Myanmar. In 2022, researchers published an analysis of the General Administration Department's nationwide 2018-2019 township reports to tabulate the ethnic makeup of the Kayah State.

=== Religion ===
Religion in Kayah (2015)
1. Buddhism (49.9%)
2. Christianity (45.8%)
3. Tribal religion (1.90%)
4. Other religion (1.20%)
5. Islam (1.10%)
6. Hinduism (0.10%)

According to the 2014 Myanmar Census, Buddhists, who make up 49.9% of Kayah State's population, form the largest religious community there. Minority religious communities include Christians (45.8%), Muslims (1.1%), Hindus (0.1%), and animists (1.9%) who collectively comprise the remainder of Kayah State's population. 1.2% of the population listed no religion, other religions, or were otherwise not enumerated.

According to the State Sangha Maha Nayaka Committee's 2016 statistics, 2060 Buddhist monks were registered in Kayah State, comprising 0.4% of Myanmar's total Sangha membership, which includes both novice samanera and fully-ordained bhikkhu. The majority of monks belong to the Thudhamma Nikaya (82.4%), followed by Shwegyin Nikaya (17.6%), with the remainder of monks belonging to other small monastic orders. 303 thilashin were registered in Kayah State, comprising 0.5% of Myanmar's total thilashin community.

The Kayans' traditional religion is called Kan Khwan, and has been practised since the people migrated from Mongolia during the Bronze Age. It includes the belief that the Kayan people are the result of a union between a female dragon and a male human/angel hybrid.

The major religious festival is the three-day Kay Htein Bo festival, which commemorates the belief that the creator god gave form to the world by planting a small post in the ground. During this festival, held in late March or early April, a Kay Htoe Boe pole is erected and participants dance around the pole. This festival is held to venerate the eternal god and creator messengers, to give thanks for blessings during the year, to appeal for forgiveness, and pray for rain. It is also an opportunity for Kayan from different villages to come together to maintain the solidarity of the tribe.

The Kayan have a strong belief in augury and nothing is done without reference to some form of divination, including breaking thatch grass, but most importantly consulting the chicken bones. Nowadays the annual Kay Htein Bo festival is always accompanied by a reading of the chicken bones to predict the year ahead. Fowl bone prognostication can be witnessed in the Kayan villages in Thailand's Mae Hong Son province during the annual festival and during "Cleansing Ceremonies" which are held when a family has encountered misfortune. Dreams are also used to make predictions.

== Politics ==
As with many other states in Myanmar, which have ethnic minority populations, Kayah State has experienced human rights abuses by the Burmese military junta and the Burmese armed forces.

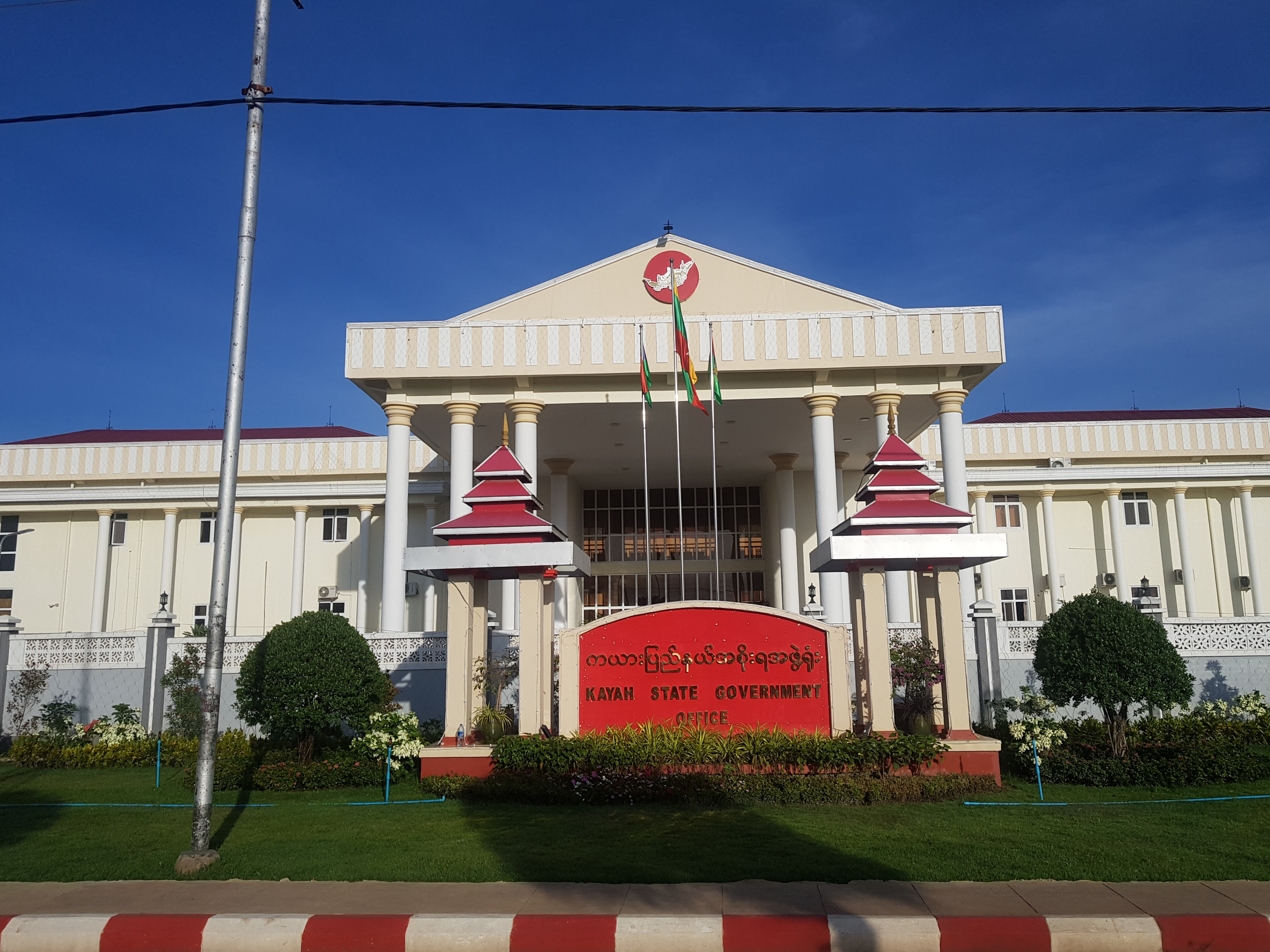
Kayah State Government Otfice

Villagers live under the constant threat of rape, beatings, arbitrary arrest or execution, conscription as slave labour for the Myanmar army, and having their food and possessions taken without compensation.

"The SPDC also arbitrarily closes roads for non-military travel in Karenni State, further restricting villagers movements. Landmines are often planted along roads to prohibit the villagers' movements. Villagers, fearful of landmines and potential injuries, further restrict their own movements.

Even with a valid travel pass villagers are still vulnerable to abuses and exploitation. There have been reports of arrests, torture, extrajudicial killings and rapes of villagers who have had permission to travel. Villagers have also been shot at when they have been outside of their communities."

It has also been alleged that the relocation centers have inadequate access to water, food, medical services, and educational facilities. As of April 2024, more than 80% of the state's population is classified as internally displaced. Thousands of Karenni people are in refugee camps in Thailand.

"Currently there are 4,800 IDPs in eight forced relocation sites throughout Karenni State. These relocation sites are a result of the Burmese military regimes mass relocation program in Karenni State in 1996. Following the collapse of the ceasefire between SLORC and the KNPP, tens of thousands of people were forcibly evicted from their homes during this program.

"Most relocation sites are located close to military camps, army bases and along main roads. This increases the vulnerability of exploitation and abuse. IDPs are subjected to force labour demands from the soldiers and arbitrary taxation (essentially theft). IDPs are also vulnerable to torture; murder and rape by soldiers and their movements are heavily restricted.

"The relocation sites are also inadequate to sustain a healthy and economically viable livelihood. The majority of relocation sites do not have sanitation facilities, electricity or access to safe drinking water. The land surrounding the sites is often barren and over populated. As productive land has usually been claimed by the original inhabitants or confiscated by the soldiers, opportunities to farm are limited. There are also very few employment opportunities in forced relocation sites."

== Administration ==
The state capital is Loikaw. The state is divided into 4 districts which are divided into 7 townships with 106 wards and villages.

=== Districts and townships ===
Loikaw District(လွိုင်ကော်ခရိုင်)	Loikaw Township(လွိုင်ကော်မြို့နယ်) • Shadaw Township(ရှားတောမြို့နယ်)
Demoso District(ဒီမိုဆိုခရိုင်)	Demoso Township(ဒီမိုဆိုမြို့နယ်) • Hpruso Township (ဖရူဆိုမြို့နယ်)
Bawlakhe District(ဘော်လခဲခရိုင်)	Bawlakhe Township(ဘော်လခဲမြို့နယ်) • Hpasawng Township(ဖားဆောင်းမြို့နယ်)
Mese District(မယ်စဲ့ခရိုင်)	Mese Township(မယ်စဲ့မြို့နယ်)

=== Major towns ===
Towns and Cities of Kayah State

- Bawlakhe
- Demoso
- Hpasawng
- Hpruso
- Lawpita
- Loikaw
- Loilinlay
- Mawchi
- Mese
- Nanmekon
- Shadaw
- Ywathit

== Government ==
=== Judiciary ===
Kayah State High Court

=== List of chief ministers ===
- Khin Maung Oo (2011–2016; 2021–2022)
- L Phaung Sho (2016–2020)
- Boss Ko (acting; 2020–2021)
- Zaw Myo Tin (2022–2023)

== Transportation ==
Kayah State has various ways transportations, such as:

=== Air ===
Loikaw Airport is the only airport in Kayah State, with flights to Yangon, Mandalay and Heho.

=== Land ===
Kayah State is served by Loikaw Bus Station and Loikaw Railway Station as land transportation.

== Economy ==
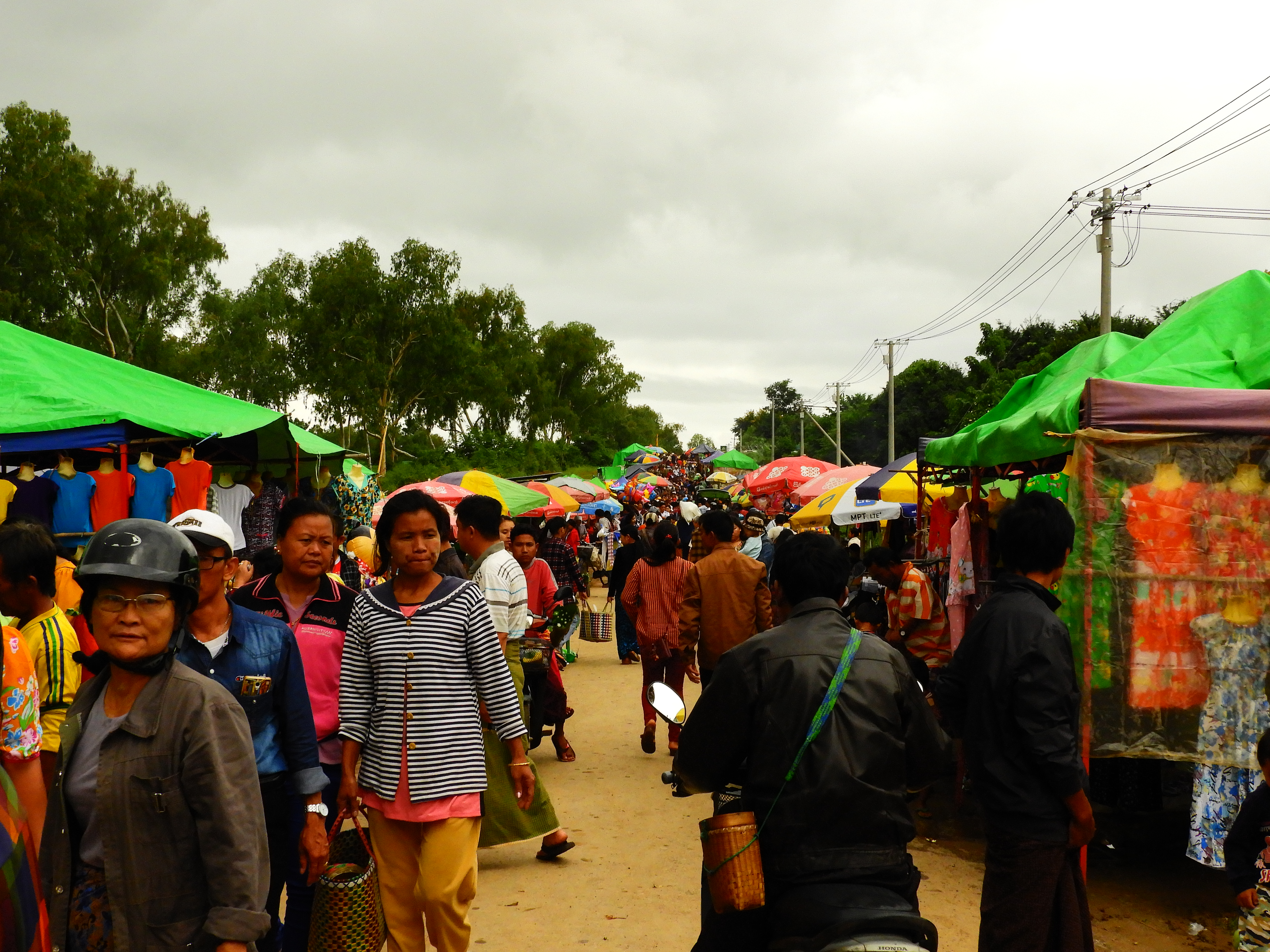
Market near Loikaw, Kayah State

Kayah State has a primarily extraction-based economy. The main crop is rice, mostly irrigated, with other important crops including millet, maize, sesame, groundnut, garlic, and vegetables. Mineral products include alabaster, tin, and tungsten. Valuable woods such as teak and pine were once produced, but the forests have largely been stripped bare by illegal logging authorised by the Tatmadaw (Burmese military). The hydroelectric power plant at Lawpita Falls outside of Loikaw is of strategic importance, as it supplies over 20% of Myanmar's total electrical power.

Kayah State has theoretical tourist potential, if the political situation is resolved. The state has rugged mountains, river streams, lakes and waterfalls; however, transport and communication are difficult. At present, Kayah State is open to outsiders by permit only, which can be difficult to obtain depending on the current military situation. Even with a permit, usually only a 25 km (16 mi) radius around Loikaw is allowed. The central government effectively controls only Loikaw and parts of the western half of the state.

As of 2018, the state is the most electrified in Myanmar, at 87%.

== Education ==
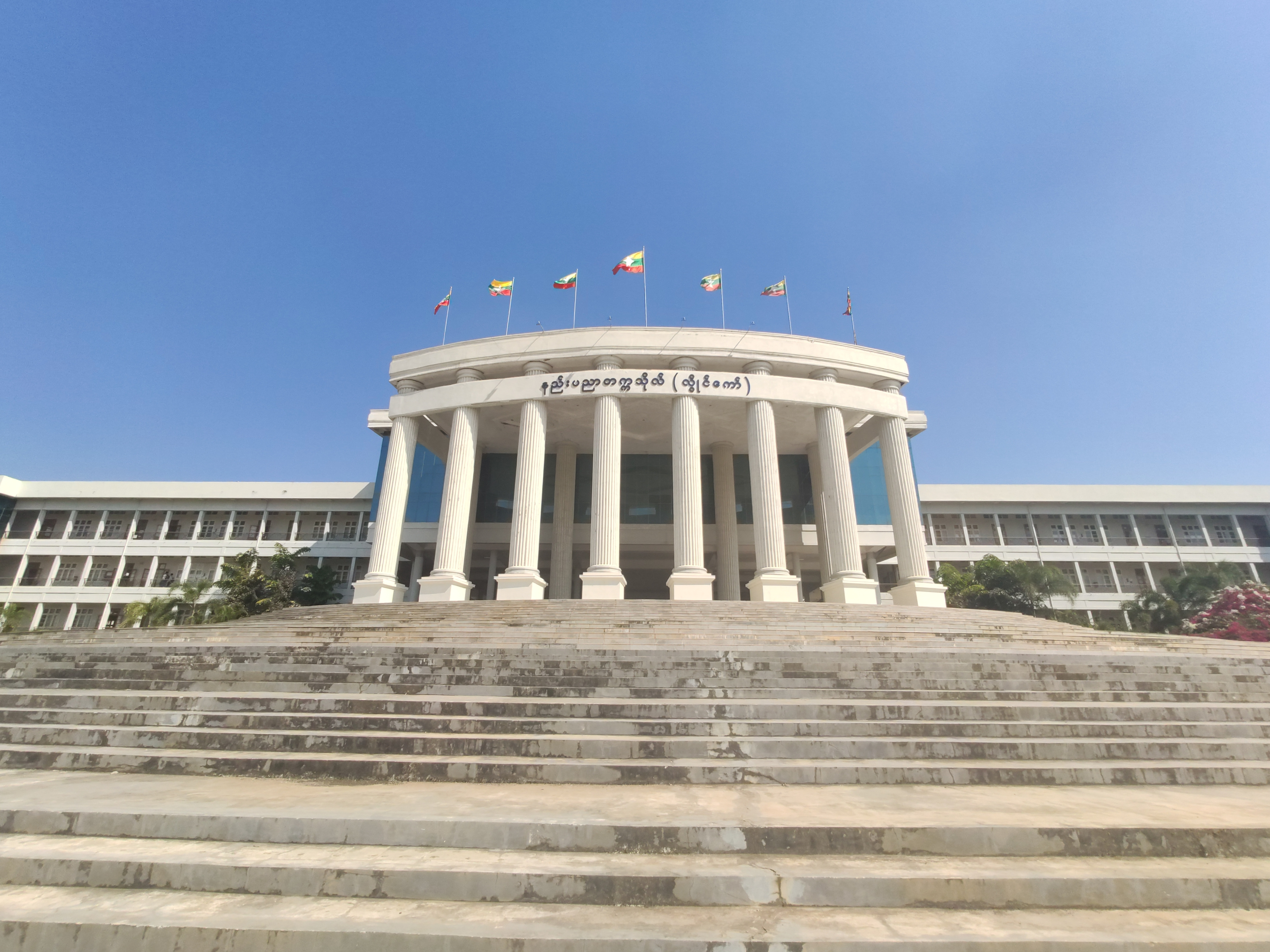
Technological University, Loikaw

Educational opportunities in Myanmar are extremely limited outside the main cities of Yangon and Mandalay. According to official statistics, Kayah State has the lowest number of public schools in the country. Loikaw University is the state's main university.

- Loikaw University
- Technological University, Loikaw
- Computer University, Loikaw

AY 2002-2003	Primary	Middle	High
Schools	338	33	12
Teachers	1565	352	160
Students	29,200	13,200	4900

== Health care ==
Kayah State, most of Myanmar, has poor health care facilities due to the alleged mismanagement by the Burmese military junta and economic sanctions by the US government. Although health care is nominally free, in reality patients have to pay for medicine and treatment even in public clinics and hospitals. Public hospitals lack many of the basic facilities and equipment. As Kayah State is perhaps the most isolated state in Myanmar, it has great difficulties in addressing health concerns.

In 2016, Loikaw General Hospital was upgraded with the 1.945 billion yen funding from Japan International Cooperation Agency (JICA). The following is a summary of the public health care system in the state.

2002–2003	# Hospitals	# Beds
Specialist hospitals	0	0
General hospitals with specialist services	1	200
General hospitals	6	141
Health clinics	9	144
Total	16	485

== Gallery ==
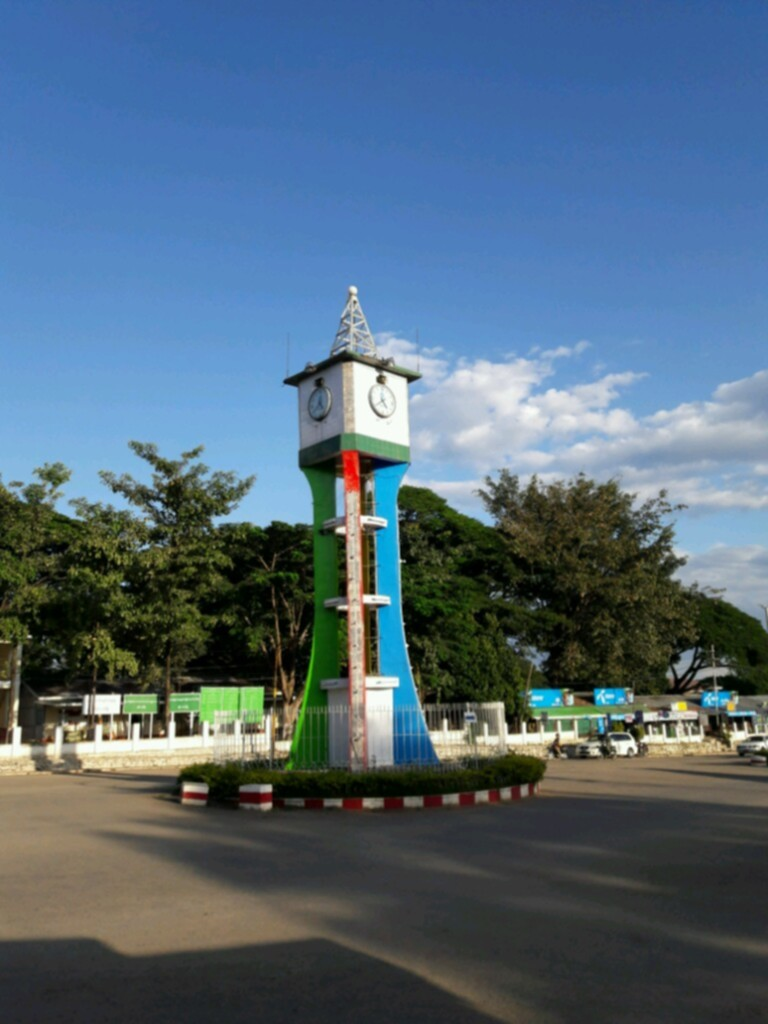
Loikaw Clock Tower

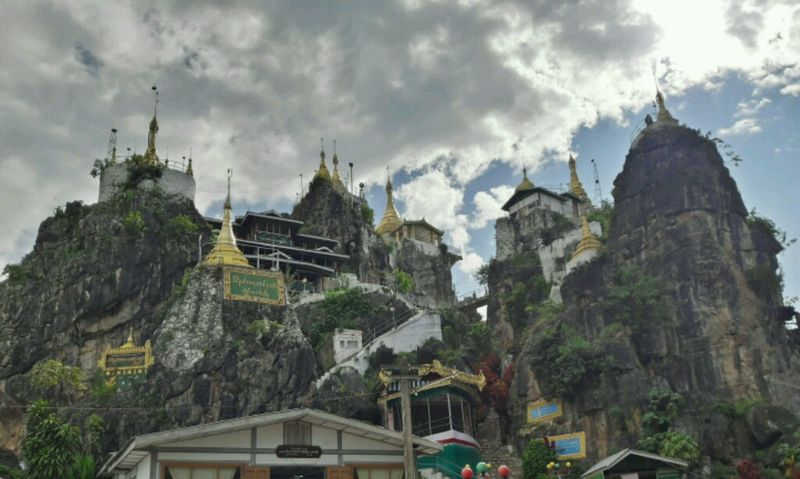
Taung Kwe Pagoda

== See also ==
- Kayah State Cultural Museum
