= Burmese people =

Myanmar people (Burmese people)
မြန်မာလူမျိုး

Total population
- c. 53,450,740

Regions with significant populations
- Myanmar c. 51 million (2014)
- Thailand: 1,418,472 (2014)
- China: 351,248 (2020)
- Malaysia: 303,996 (2014)
- Saudi Arabia: 268,000 (2020)
- United States: 244,046 (2022)
- Singapore: 200,000 (2017)
- Japan: 160,362 (2025)
- Australia: 59,774 (2021)
- Taiwan: 40,000 (2017)
- France: 10,000-15,000 (2010)
- South Korea: 14,592 (2014)
- Canada: 13,850 (2016)
- United Kingdom: 8,543 (2011)
- Norway: 4,307 (2022)
- Denmark: 2,666 (2022)
- New Zealand: 2,187 (2013)
- Finland: 2,154 (2021)
- Sweden: 2,069 (2021)
- Netherlands: 1,683 (2022)
- Germany: 1,402 (2013)
- France: 1,000
- Brazil: 411 (2025)

Languages
- Languages of Myanmar, including Burmese, Shan, Karenic languages, Rakhine, Kachin, Mon, Kuki-Chin languages, and Burmese English

Religion
- Predominantly Theravada Buddhism and Burmese folk religion, Nat (spirit)/Animism; Minority: Christianity; Islam; Hinduism

Burmese people or the Myanmar people (Burmese: မြန်မာလူမျိုး) are citizens of Myanmar (Burma), irrespective of their ethnic or religious background. Myanmar is a multiethnic, multicultural, and multilingual country. The Burmese government officially recognises 135 ethnic groups, who are grouped into eight 'national races,' the Bamar (Burmans), Shan, Karen, Rakhine (Arakanese), Mon, Kachin, Chin, and Kayah (Karenni). Many ethnic and ethnoreligious communities exist outside these groupings, such as the Burmese Chinese and Panthay, Burmese Indians, Anglo-Burmese, and Gurkhas.

The 2014 Myanmar Census enumerated 51,486,253 persons. There is also a substantial Burmese diaspora, the majority of it in neighbouring Asian countries. Refugees and asylum seekers from Myanmar make up one of the world's five largest refugee populations.

== Terminology ==
The term "Burmese people" is often used to refer to all citizens of Myanmar, regardless of their ethnic background. Myanmar is a multiethnic country, with over 100 recognized ethnic groups. The term "Burmese" is sometimes associated specifically with the Bamar (Burman) ethnic group, which is the largest group, comprising around 68% of the population. According to the government of Myanmar, ‘Burmese people’ refers to all recognised peoples of the country, encompassing citizens of various ethnicities such as the Shan, Karen, Rakhine, and others.

The distinction between "Burmese" and "Bamar" is crucial, as the term "Bamar" is often used to describe the majority ethnic group, while "Burmese" is a broader term that refers to the citizens of the country. The term "Myanmarese" is also used to avoid confusion or exclusion of non-Bamar ethnic groups, although use of this is uncommon and may itself cause confusion.

== Concept of taing-yin-tha ==
An ethnolinguistic map of Myanmar from 1972

Similar to the concepts of pribumi in Indonesia and bumiputera in Malaysia, Burmese society categorises indigenous peoples who historically lived in modern-day Myanmar as taing-yin-tha (တိုင်းရင်းသား), which is typically translated as 'national race' or 'indigenous race.' Taing-yin-tha literally means 'those who form the basis of the state' or 'offspring of a region.'

The Burmese government officially recognizes 135 taing-yin-tha ethnic groups (တိုင်းရင်းသားလူမျိုး) as "original inhabitants" who lived in Myanmar before the British annexation of Lower Burma in 1824. These 'ethnic' designations have been challenged and disputed as exclusionary and arbitrary legacies of colonialism that "reified and rigidified ethnic identities", inevitably sowing political and economic divisions along ethnic lines. In the pre-colonial era, cultural identities were fluid and dynamic, defined on the basis of patron–client relationships, religions, and regions.

Ethnic identity in Myanmar has been significantly shaped by colonialism and decolonisation. During the early colonial era, the term taing-yin-tha was not politically salient. In the 1950s, the term was used to promote solidarity among indigenous peoples. By the 1960s, the term evolved, acquiring a more prescriptive definition, specifically referencing the country's eight 'national races', the Bamar (Burmans), Shan, Karen, Rakhine (Arakanese), Mon, Kachin, Chin, and Kayah (Karenni). After the 1962 Burmese coup d'état, this term began to acquire political saliency, central to the Burmese military's nation-building programme, which closely linked indigenous heritage with rights to Burmese citizenship.

In the 1980s, the government formally categorised ethnolinguistic groups into 135 subcategories within the construct of the eight national races, an idea further propagated by the military junta after the 1988 coup. This has remained the official framework for categorising the country's diverse communities. Myanmar's seven states are named after each of the national races, with the exception of the Bamar, who have traditionally lived in all seven regions (formerly called divisions).

== Burmese diaspora ==
The Burmese diaspora refers to families and individuals who have migrated to other parts of the world from Myanmar. Myanmar has experienced significant waves of population displacement, due to decades of internal conflict, poverty, and political persecution, often triggered by political events like the 1962 Burmese coup d'état, the 8888 Uprising and ensuing 1988 coup d'état, and the 2021 Myanmar coup d'état. The diaspora is broadly categorised into three groups: religious minorities and ethnic groups who have fled conflict areas, elites seeking more politically stable environments, and others seeking improved educational and economic opportunities. In 2021, 1.2 million refugees and asylum seekers were from Myanmar, making them the world's fifth-largest refugee population, behind Syria, Venezuela, Afghanistan, and South Sudan.

The diaspora in neighbouring Asian countries generally works in unskilled labour sectors (e.g., agriculture, fishing, manufacturing) while increasing numbers of white-collar workers have resettled in the Western world. The significant brain drain of entrepreneurs, professionals, and intellectuals resulting from continued decline in Myanmar's sociopolitical environment has had significant ramifications on the country's economic development, particularly in terms of human capital. The military coup in 2021 resulted in the exodus of repatriates of Burmese nationality (e.g., professionals, executives, and investors) and expatriates alike, impacting the country's emerging startup scene.

Thailand is the most popular destination for Burmese migrants; two million Burmese people live in Thailand. According to the 2014 census, 70% of overseas Burmese reside in Thailand, followed by Malaysia, China, and Singapore. Overseas Burmese also live in India, Bangladesh, Pakistan, Japan, and South Korea. Following the 1962 Burmese coup d'état, between 1963 and 1970, 155,000 Burmese Indians were repatriated to India and resettled by the Indian government in 'Burma Colonies' in cities like Chennai, Tiruchirappalli and Madurai. Outside of Asia, there is also a significant diaspora in the United States, Australia, United Kingdom, New Zealand, and Sweden.

Since the outbreak of civil war in 2021, Japan has taken a large role in taking Burmese refugees. Japan's Burmese population went from 37,000 in 2021 to 56,000 in 2022 and about 69,000 by June 2023. Myanmar was the first country from which Japan took large numbers of refugees due to their longstanding relationship. Japan also has a "Little Yangon" in Tokyo's Takadanobaba area.

== Genetics ==
Myanmar is at the confluence of East Asia, South Asia, and Southeast Asia. Its indigenous inhabitants show a haplogroup distribution that's typically Southeast Asian but with additional Northeast Asian and Indian influences. One study found genetic disparities between Bamar and Karen despite the fact that both speak Tibeto-Burman languages. The Bamar show extraordinary degrees of genetic diversity whilst the Karen show greater genetic isolation. The Bamar, Rakhine, and Karen also show closer affinity with Tai-Kadai and Hmong-Mien populations in Southeast Asia whilst the Naga and Chin show closer genetic affinities with Austro-Asiatic and Tibeto-Burman populations from northeast India. Another study of basal lineages suggests that Myanmar was likely one of the differentiation centers of early modern humans. A 2024 study shows that Burmese populations share common ancestry with other Tibeto-Burman populations, who are characterized by a mixture of Late Neolithic Upper Yellow River and Paleolithic Eurasian ancestries, but show less Northeast Asian influence due to additional admixture with local Tai-Kadai and Austroasiatic-speaking populations.

== See also ==
- List of ethnic groups in Myanmar
- Migration period of ancient Burma
- Myanmar nationality law
- Burmese diaspora
- Demographics of Myanmar
- Languages of Myanmar
- Culture of Myanmar
