= Burmese people in Sweden =

ဆွီဒင်က မြန်မာလူမျိုးတွေ
- (Myanmar) (Sweden)

Total population
- 1,646 (2024) (c. 0.016% of the Swedish population)

Regions with significant populations
- Central Sweden; Örebro

Languages
- Various languages of Myanmar, Swedish

Religion
- Majority: Christianity; Theravada Buddhism; Minority: Islam; Hinduism; Irreligion

Related ethnic groups
- Burmese Americans, Burmese Australians, and other Burmese diaspora

Burmese people in Sweden (Swedish: burmeser i Sverige) are citizens and residents of Sweden with full or partial ancestry from Myanmar (formally Burma), a country with over 130 ethnic groups. This includes people born in Myanmar who have migrated to Sweden, as well as their descendants.

== Demographics ==
The Karen, Rohingya, Bamar, and Chin ethnic groups make up the majority of the Burmese population in Sweden. In 2024, 1,646 Burmese people were living in Sweden.

== History ==
Some 125 Burmese people lived in Sweden in 2000.

In 2005, 20-30 refugees from the Karen ethnic group established the Karen Swedish Community to help preserve their culture and deal with difficulties or discrimination they may face in Sweden.

Between 2000 and 2012, a major influx of refugees originating from Myanmar arrived to Sweden, many of whom were fleeing ethnic and religious persecution under Burmese military rule.

== Notable people ==
- Markus Aujalay

== See also ==
- Burmese diaspora
- Asian immigrants to Sweden
- Demographics of Sweden
