= Burmese Americans =

Americans of Burmese birth or descent

မြန်မာဇာတိနွယ် အမေရိကန်
- The spread of Burmese ancestry (alone or in any combination) by U.S. state according to the 2020 census.

Total population
- 249,950 (2024) (Ancestry or ethnic origin); 157,626 (2024) (Born in Myanmar)

Regions with significant populations
- Indiana (Indianapolis/Fort Wayne); Minneapolis-St. Paul; Dallas–Fort Worth; New York, especially Albany, New York City, Utica, and Buffalo; San Francisco Bay Area; Metro Atlanta; Milwaukee; Tulsa; Battle Creek; Des Moines; Omaha; Greater Los Angeles; Kansas City Metropolitan Area

Languages
- English, Burmese, Karen, Chin, Indo-Iranian languages

Religion
- Christianity, Theravada Buddhism, Islam, Hinduism

Related ethnic groups
- Burmese people, Bamar people, Karen people, Karenni people, Rohingya people, Burmese Britons, Burmese Australians

Burmese Americans (Burmese: မြန်မာဇာတိနွယ် အမေရိကန် [mjəmà zàtḭnwɛ̀ ʔəmèjḭkàɰ̃]) are Americans of full or partial Burmese ancestry, encompassing individuals of all ethnic backgrounds with ancestry in present-day Myanmar (or Burma), regardless of specific ethnicity. As a subgroup of Asian Americans, Burmese Americans have largely integrated into the broader Southeast Asian and South Asian American communities.

The Minneapolis-Saint Paul, Indianapolis, and Fort Wayne metropolitan areas are home to the largest Burmese American communities. As of August 2023, the Burmese population stands at 320,000, according to the Burmese American Community Institute. From 2011 to 2023, refugees from Myanmar represented the largest group among U.S. refugee arrivals, accounting for 18 percent.

== History ==
The first Burmese to study in the United States was Maung Shaw Loo, of Mon descent, who came in 1858 to study at the University at Lewisburg (now Bucknell University) in Pennsylvania. He graduated with a medical degree in 1867 and returned to Burma the following year.

In 1894, the case of In re Po ruled that Burmese are not white according to common knowledge and legal precedent.

The first major wave of immigrants from Burma (now Myanmar) occurred from the 1960s to the late 1970s, after Ne Win established military rule in 1962, following the 1962 Burmese coup d'état. Most immigrants were primarily of Sino-Burmese descent, who arrived in increasing numbers following the 1967 anti-Chinese riots. The Burmese Chinese were the first major group of Theravada Buddhists to immigrate to the United States and were largely educated professionals, business entrepreneurs and technically skilled workers. A minority were of Anglo-Burmese and Indian descent. Some Burmese immigrated to the United States after the Immigration and Nationality Act of 1965 abolished the previously existing quota on Asian immigrants.

A second wave occurred from the late 1980s to the early 1990s after the national uprising in 1988. This wave was more diverse, including Bamars, Karens, and other ethnic minorities, including political refugees involved in the 8888 Uprising. They are concentrated in Fort Wayne, Indiana. Between 1977 and 2000, 25,229 Burmese immigrated to the United States, although the figure is inaccurate because it does not include Burmese who immigrated via other countries to the U.S.

A third wave of immigration, from 2006 to date, has been primarily of ethnic minorities in Myanmar, in particular Karen refugees from the Thai-Burmese border. From October 2006 to August 2007, 12,800 Karen refugees resettled in the United States. During the same period, tens of thousands of Chin refugees arrived in the United States from the Indian state of Mizoram and from Malaysia. From 2011 to 2023, refugees from Myanmar represented the largest group among U.S. refugee arrivals, accounting for 18 percent, owing to ethnic conflict and political instability, particularly the targeted persecution of Christian minority groups.

Burmese in far smaller numbers continue to immigrate to the United States today, mainly through family sponsorships and the "green card lottery". Thousands of Burmese each year apply for a Diversity Immigrant Visa (previously known as "OP" and now called "DV"), a lottery-based program that grants visas to those who wish to reside in the United States.

== Demographics ==
Historical population
Year	Pop.	±%
2000	16,720	—
2011	106,725	+538.3%
2020	233,347	+118.6%
2024	249,950	+7.1%
Source: American Community Survey, United States census

The Burmese American population has significantly increased since the beginning of the 21st century, due to an ongoing wave of immigration, and changes in self-identification. From 2000 to 2010, the population increased by a factor of 5.

In the lead-up to the 2010 census, an awareness campaign was conducted by the Burmese Complete Count Committee, which consisted of Burmese American organizations, to convince Burmese Americans to self-identify as "Burmese" on census forms.

Following the 2010 census, "Burmese" became a distinct ethnic category (previously they were categorized as "other Asians.") From 2010 to 2021, the population more than doubled. Following the 2021 Myanmar coup d'état, waves of Burmese have fled the junta, contributing to a surge in growth. According to the Burmese American Community Institute, as of August 2023, the Burmese American population stands at 322,000.

== Communities ==
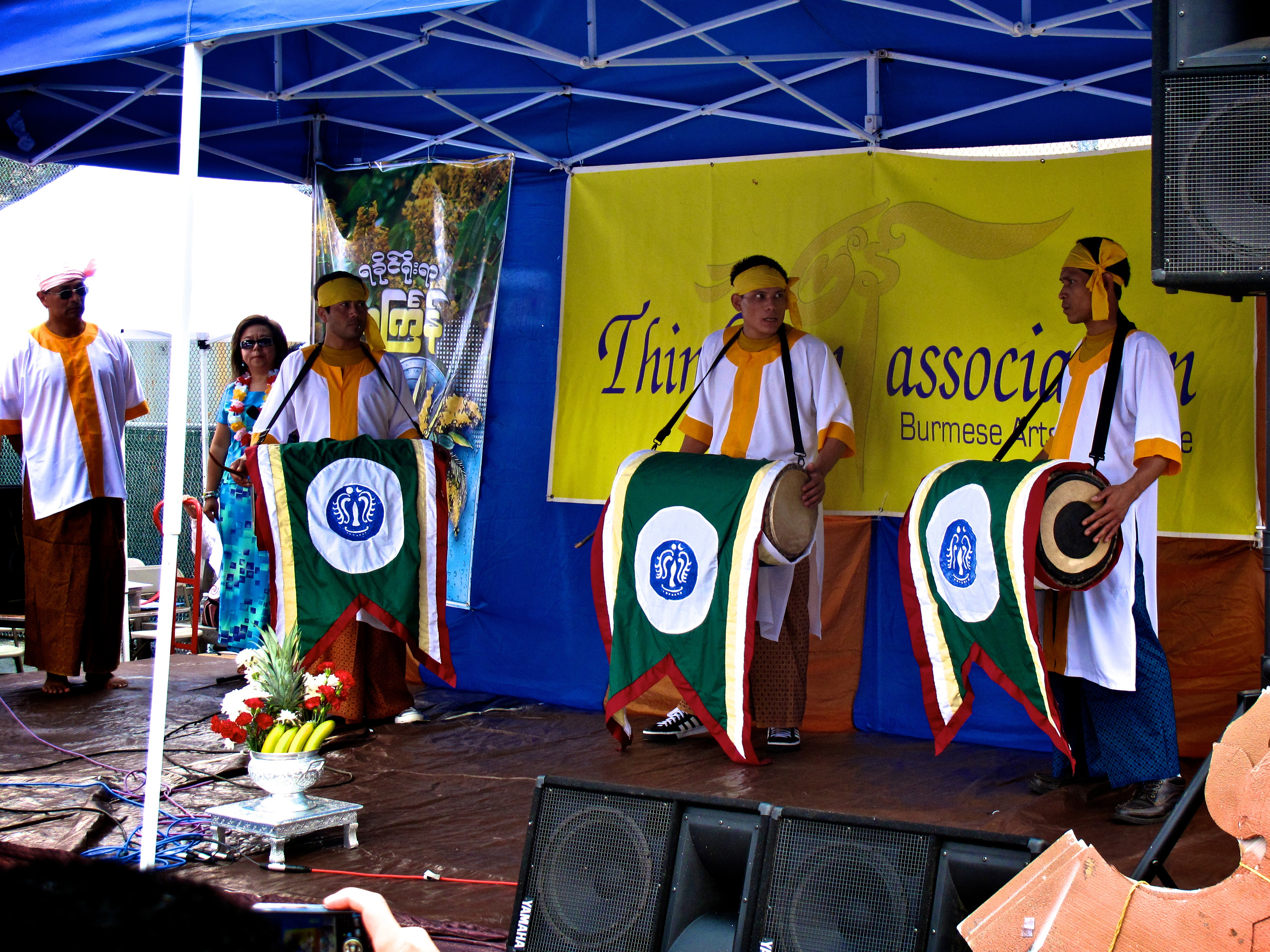
Drummers of the Rakhine minority performing on the Burmese New Year, Thingyan, in New York City

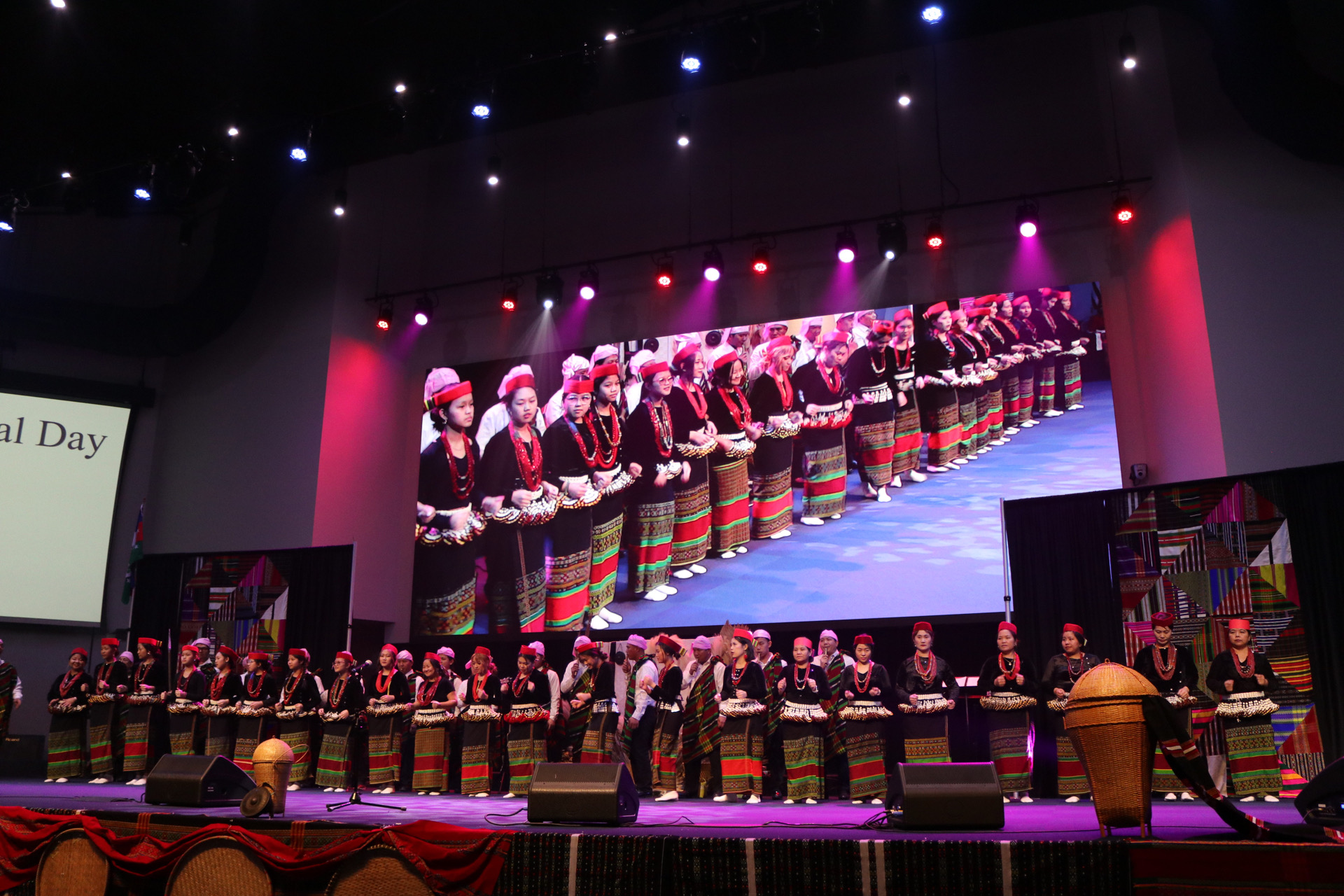
Chin people celebrating the 75th Chin National Day in Indianapolis, Indiana

Many Burmese join already large immigration populations in mid-sized cities, especially those in the Rust Belt and Great Plains. In 2024, the top ten metropolitan areas with the most residents reporting Burmese ancestry were as follows:

City	Burmese Population	Burmese Percentage
Indianapolis–Carmel–Greenwood, IN	18,183	0.870%
Minneapolis-St. Paul-Bloomington, MN-WI	12,182	0.330%
Los Angeles-Long Beach-Anaheim, CA	9,726	0.074%
Fort Wayne, IN	9,404	2.100%
San Francisco–Oakland–Fremont, CA	9,276	0.195%
Dallas–Fort Worth–Arlington, TX	8,693	0.114%
New York–Newark–Jersey City, NY-NJ	8,483	0.042%
Milwaukee–Waukesha, WI	6,311	0.401%
Atlanta–Sandy Springs–Roswell, GA	6,298	0.103%
Chicago–Naperville–Elgin, IL-IN	6,246	0.066%

Nuances regarding the diverse Burmese populations through metropolitan areas in the U.S. are as follows:

- Indianapolis, Indiana – The Burmese share of Southport's population stands at 24%, one of the highest anywhere in the U.S. 18,183 Burmese live in the Indianapolis area.
- Minneapolis-Saint Paul, Minnesota – Most of Minnesota's 2,500+ Karen live in the Twin Cities.
- Los Angeles, California – 9,726 Burmese live in Los Angeles.
- Fort Wayne, Indiana – 9,404 Burmese live in Fort Wayne, making up 2.1% of the metropolitan area population.
- Iowa – At least 9,000 Burmese live in Iowa, many of whom live in Des Moines, Waterloo, Cedar Rapids, and Dubuque.
- Tulsa, Oklahoma – Home to around 7,000–9,000 Zomi (Chin), considered the largest concentration of Zomi people in the U.S.
- Dallas-Fort Worth – An estimated 5,000 Chin refugees are concentrated in Lewisville in Denton County, Texas. 8,693 Burmese live in the entire metroplex.
- New York City – 8,483, mainly in Queens, Brooklyn, and Northern New Jersey
- Milwaukee, Wisconsin – 6,311 Burmese live in Milwaukee. It has the largest Rohingya community in the U.S.
- Atlanta, Georgia – Metro Atlanta is home to 6,298 Burmese, with 1,283 in Clarkston.
- Chicago, Illinois – The West Ridge area alone is home to over 2,000 Rohingya refugees and may have the highest concentration of that ethnic group in the U.S. 6,246 Burmese live in Chicagoland.
- Omaha, Nebraska – Around 5,000 Burmese live in Omaha, primarily Karen.
- Buffalo, New York – 4,719 Burmese live in Buffalo, many of whom live on the Upper West Side.
- Utica, New York – 4.8% of Utica's residents identify as Burmese.
- Baltimore County, Maryland – Large numbers of Burmese refugees, especially Chin, in Baltimore and Howard Counties.
- Nashville, Tennessee – The city has a significant Zomi refugee population largely living in South Nashville.
- Bowling Green, Kentucky – 3,578 Burmese live in Bowling Green.
- Charlotte, North Carolina – 3,289 Burmese live in Charlotte.
- Seattle-Tacoma-Bellevue, Washington – 891 live in Kent, while 3,063 live in the entire metropolitan area.
- Portland, Oregon – 2,560 Burmese live in Portland.
- Syracuse, New York – 2,423 Burmese live in Syracuse, many of whom live on the Northside.
- Houston, Texas – 2,307 Burmese live in Greater Houston.
- Akron, Ohio – 2,124 Burmese live in Akron.
- Battle Creek, Michigan – About 1,749 Burmese live in Battle Creek, primarily Chin.
- Salt Lake City, Utah – 1,718 Burmese live in Salt Lake City.
- Albany, New York – Roughly 1,500 Burmese live in Albany.
- Bay Area – 1,373 Burmese live in or around the Bay Area.
- Philadelphia, Pennsylvania – 1,373 Burmese live in Philadelphia.
- Rock Island, Illinois – 1,262 Burmese live in the Quad Cities.
- Spokane, Washington – 932 Burmese live in the Spokane metropolitan area.
- Frederick, Maryland – 650 Burmese live in Frederick, an outer suburb of Washington, DC.
- Lowell, Massachusetts – 579 Burmese live in Lowell.
- Tri-Cities, Washington – 349 Burmese live in the Metro area.

== Culture ==
=== Religion ===
As most Burmese are Buddhists, many Burmese Buddhist monasteries (kyaung), most of which also serve as community centers, have sprouted across most major cities in the United States. A few ethnic Mon and Rakhine monasteries serve their respective ethnic populations.

Burmese Christian churches consisting mainly of ethnic Karen, Chin, Kachin, and Anglo-Burmese congregations can be found in many large and mid-sized metropolitan areas. Many Burmese Christians were granted asylum in the U.S. as refugees.

=== Languages ===
Professional immigrants from the first and second waves of Burmese migration are generally bilingual in Burmese and English. Others from more recent waves of Burmese migration tend to struggle in English due to lack of exposure, especially refugees from more remote communities. More recent immigrants tend to speak ethnic minority languages, not Burmese, as their primary mother tongue. Some Burmese Americans of Chinese descent speak some Chinese (typically Mandarin, Minnan, or Cantonese). Likewise, Burmese Americans of Indian descent may speak some Indic languages, usually Tamil or Hindi/Urdu.

== Notable people ==
This is a list of notable Burmese Americans including both Burmese immigrants who obtained American citizenship, as well as their American descendants.

- Abraham Sofaer: actor
- Adrian Zaw: actor
- Aung La Nsang: mixed martial arts fighter
- Aung San Oo: brother of Aung San Suu Kyi
- Alex Wagner: journalist and television anchor
- Edward Michael Law-Yone: journalist
- Ezra Solomon: economist
- Joshua Van: UFC Flyweight champion
- Julie Chen Moonves, journalist
- Kyaw Kyaw Naing: hsaing waing musician
- Kyi Aye: poet and novelist
- Louisa Benson Craig: activist
- Maung Gyi: Martial arts teacher who introduced bando in America
- Michael Aung-Thwin: historian and academic
- Miemie Winn Byrd: Practitioner-scholar and security analyst
- Moethee Zun: prominent leader in 1988 pro-democracy movement
- Moe Z. Win: professor at Massachusetts Institute of Technology
- MiMi Aung: NASA engineer and project manager at Jet Propulsion Laboratory
- Rich Cho: sports executive
- Thant Myint-U: academic, grandson of U Thant
- Tin Moe: poet
- Wendy Law-Yone: writer

== Community and economic issues ==
=== Poverty and education ===
In 2023, approximately 21% of Burmese Americans lived under the poverty line, compared to the average of 10% for Asian Americans. Burmese Americans had a homeownership rate of 45% in 2020 (compared to a national average of 64%), while 23% were college graduates (compared to a national average of 34%). Despite this, Burmese American high school graduates had a college going rate of 94.2% and college persistence rate of 95.7% in 2025, according to the Burmese American Community Institute.

=== Household income ===
In 2023, Burmese Americans had an average median household income of US$67,600 (equivalent to $71,432 in 2025) which is lower than the Asian American average of US$105,600 (equivalent to $111,586 in 2025). In 2020, 5% of Burmese American households had an income above $200,000, lower than the national average of 8%, while 45% of households had an income below $40,000, higher than the national average of 33%.

In 2014, when Americans' per capita income was divided by ethnic groups, Burmese Americans were found to be the second lowest-earning ethnic group per capita in the country, with a per capita income of $12,764, less than half of the American average of $25,825.

== See also ==
- Zomi Town, Tulsa
- Mrauk Oo Dhamma Center
- Vipassana movement
- Vipassana Research Institute
- Demographics of Myanmar
- Asian Americans
- Myanmar–United States relations
- Burmese diaspora
