= Burmese New Zealanders =

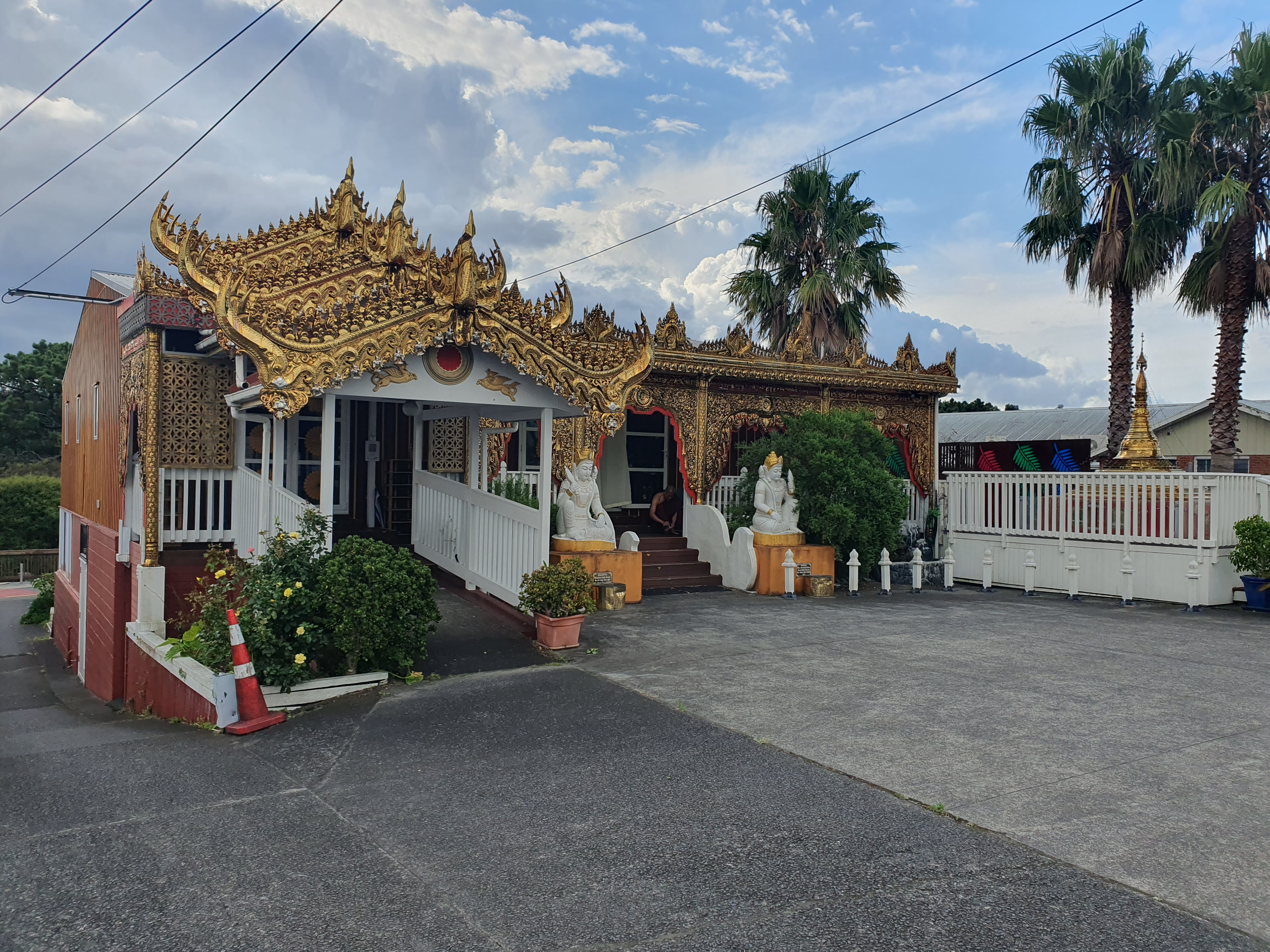
- Ratanadipa Buddhist Temple, New Lynn, Auckland

Total population
- 3,453

Languages
- New Zealand English · Burmese

Religion
- Buddhism · Christianity

Related ethnic groups
- Thai New Zealanders, Asian New Zealanders, other Burmese diaspora

Burmese New Zealanders refers to New Zealand citizens of full or partial Burmese ancestry and those born in Myanmar (Burma) who now reside in New Zealand. Most Burmese New Zealanders arrived in New Zealand from Malaysia and Thailand as refugees.

There are around 3,453 Burmese people in New Zealand, according to the 2023 census.

== See also ==
- Asian New Zealanders
- Burmese diaspora
- Burmese Australians
