= Miemie Winn Byrd =

American security scholar

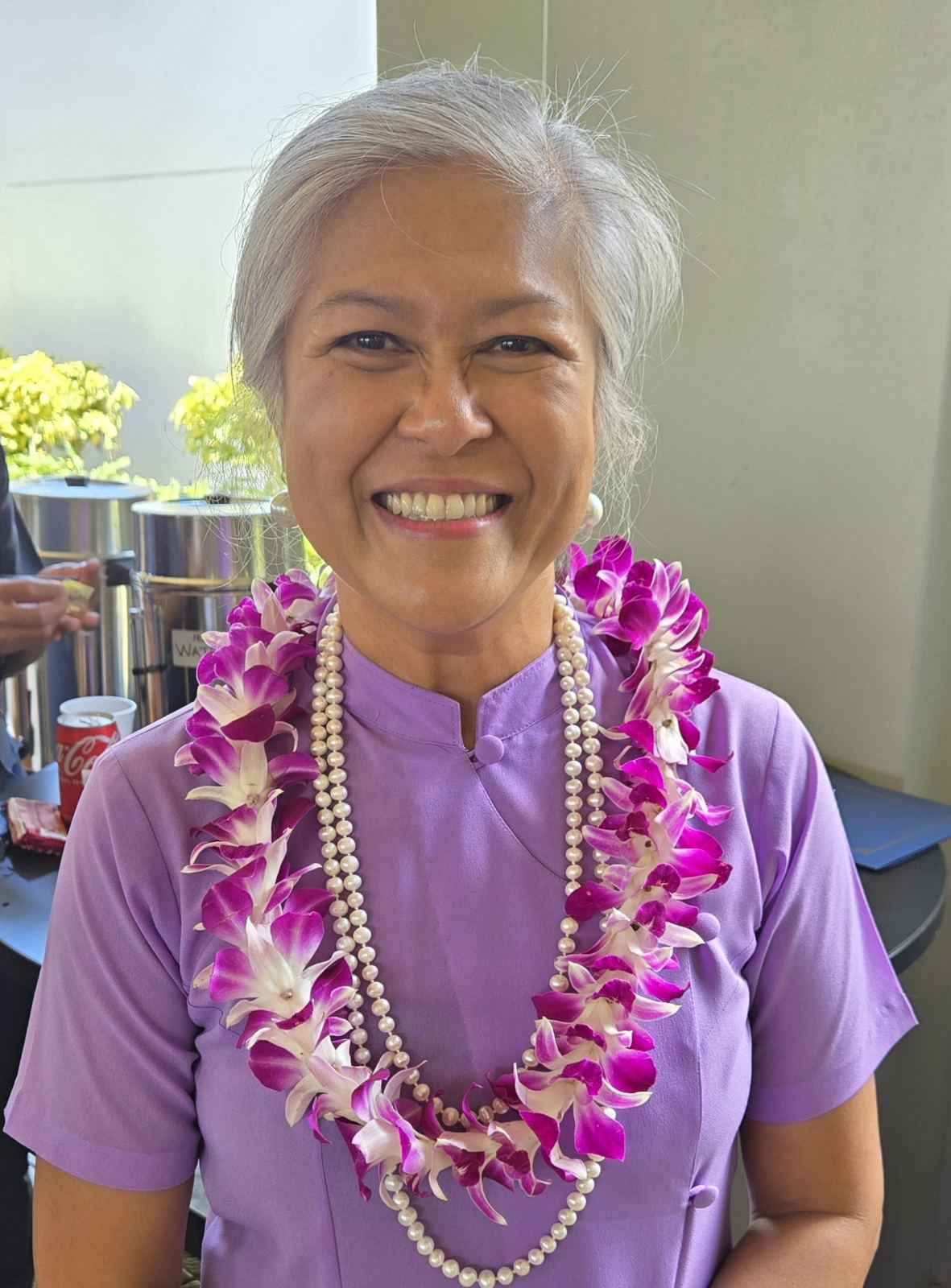
- Born: 1966 (age 59–60); Thonze, Burma
- Citizenship: U.S. Citizen
- Education: Bachelor of Arts (B.A.) in Economics and Accounting, Master of Business Administration (MBA), Doctorate in Education (Ed.D.)
- Occupation: Professor

Miemie Winn Byrd (Burmese: မီမီဝင်းဘတ်; born 1966), is a Burmese-American practitioner-scholar, security analyst, and retired U.S. Army officer. She currently serves as a Professor of Security Studies at the Daniel K. Inouye Asia-Pacific Center for Security Studies (DKI APCSS), a U.S. Department of Defense Executive Education Center located in Honolulu, Hawaii. She also specializes in civil-military operations, leadership, organizational development and innovation, women, peace and security, and transformational learning and adult education.

As a professor, she mentored senior Burmese government officials, including high-ranking military generals, by conducting security training sessions.

== Early life and education ==
Miemie Winn Byrd was born in Thonze, Burma (Myanmar), and emigrated to the United States with her parents as a teenager. She attended Nicholas Junior High School and Sunny Hills High School in Fullerton, California. Dr. Byrd earned a Bachelor of Arts (B.A.) in Economics and Accounting from Claremont McKenna College and a Master of Business Administration (MBA) with an emphasis on Asia-Pacific Economics and Business from the University of Hawaii. She later obtained a Doctorate in Education (Ed.D.) in Leadership from the University of Southern California.

== Military career ==
Byrd retired from the U.S. Army after 28 years of service. Her career was primarily focused on her role as a Civil Affairs Officer, where she engaged in activities at the intersection of military operations and civilian populations in host nations. She was involved in facilitating security cooperation between the U.S. military and civilian organizations, especially in regions affected by conflict and disaster.

During her service, she held various positions, including Deputy Economic Advisor, Civil-Military Operations Plans Officer, and Interagency Operations Officer at U.S. Pacific Command. She supported Operations Enduring Freedom and the War on Terrorism. Additionally, she served as a linguist and cultural advisor to U.S. delegations at the Association of Southeast Asian Nations (ASEAN) Regional Forum, participated in POW/MIA recovery negotiations in Myanmar, contributed to Operation Caring Response to Cyclone Nargis, and was involved in U.S.-Myanmar Human Rights Dialogues.

Her expertise in the socio-political landscape of Myanmar and neighboring countries contributed to U.S. military and diplomatic efforts in the region. Her service also included work on policy and strategy, particularly in Southeast Asia.

== Advocacy and academic career ==
After retiring from military service, Byrd continued her work in advocacy and academia, with a focus on regional security in Southeast Asia and Myanmar. She has authored several articles, including “Women on the Front Lines in Myanmar’s Fight for Democracy,” published in the Journal of Indo-Pacific Affairs. Her writings often examine the challenges faced by women in conflict zones and their roles in democratic movements and economic growth.

She has also published on topics such as strategic competition in the Indo-Pacific, socio-economic strategies for combating terrorism, and the role of women in security. Some of her selected publications include:

- “Myanmar’s Unrest: Implications of the Military Coup on Strategic Competition in the Indo-Pacific” in Indo-Pacific Defense Forum.
- “Has Myanmar Become China’s Back Door to the Indian Ocean?” in Hindsight, Insight, Foresight.
- “Worlds Apart: Why North Korea Won’t Follow Myanmar’s Path to Reform” in Global Asia.
- “Combating Terrorism: A Socio-Economic Strategy” and “Combating Terrorism with Socioeconomics: Leveraging the Private Sector” in Joint Force Quarterly.

She also served as the editor for USPACOM's Asia-Pacific Economic Update publications from 2003 to 2007. She spearheaded the establishment and launch of the Suu Foundation, a 501(c)(3) U.S. non-profit entity, at the request of Nobel Peace Laureate Daw Aung San Suu Kyi in 2013. She also serves on the Board of Governors of the Keck Center for International and Strategic Studies at Claremont McKenna College in Claremont, California, and as an Adjunct Fellow at the East-West Center in Honolulu, Hawaii. Additionally, she is on the Selection Committee for the USABCI Myanmar Scholarship Fund under the U.S.-ASEAN Business Council Institute based in Washington, D.C., and serves on several regional advisory committees, including the Knowledge for Democracy Myanmar Initiative of the Asia Regional Office, International Development Research Centre (IDRC), Thanakha International Gender Network, and Myanmar Policy Institute (MPI).

She has been a frequent commentator on Myanmar affairs, participating in interviews and panel discussions with international media outlets. She advocated for the full integration of Burmese women into the military. In the aftermath of the Pazigyi massacre, she expressed deep sadness and condemned the tragic incident in which hundreds of civilians were killed in a military council airstrike during a public gathering, declaring it a war crime. She emphasized that it is crucial for all people to unite and participate in the revolution to completely eradicate the military dictatorship. She is actively working to bring Myanmar's issues to the forefront in the U.S. Congress. On March 26, 2024, she met with U.S. Representative Paul Tonko in Albany, New York, to discuss matters related to increasing U.S. support and focus on the restoration of democracy in Myanmar.

== Personal life ==
She is married to Dr. John Edward Byrd, who is currently serving as a civilian employee in the U.S. military. He is a scientist specializing in the study of living organisms and their remains. They have four children: three daughters and one son.
