= Asian immigrants to Sweden =

Total population
- 310,293 (citizenship to Asian countries); 845,230 (born in Asia, 2022)

Regions with significant populations
- Stockholm, Gothenburg, Malmö, Uppsala, Västerås, Örebro, Linköping

Languages
- Swedish · languages of Asia

Religion
- Christianity · East Asian religions (Buddhism) · Hinduism · Islam

Related ethnic groups
- Ethnic groups in Asia

Asian immigrants to Sweden are citizens and residents of Sweden who were born in or have ancestry from nations in Asia. Due to immigration, from 2000 to 2020, Sweden's Asian-born population grew by 577,651.

Many immigrants to Sweden are from Asia, with Syria and Iraq being the largest countries of Asian origin.

Residents born in Asia living in Sweden enumerated 845,230 people in 2022, approximately 9% of Sweden's population.

== History ==
Major waves of Asian immigration began due to political turmoil in various Asian countries. This notably began in the 1970s, when about 40,000 immigrants from Turkey came to the country. From 1985 to 1995, almost 40,000 Iranians immigrated to Sweden after the Iranian Revolution, and during this same time, about 15,000 Lebanese immigrants came to Sweden due to conflict in their homeland.

By 2003, Sweden had about 16,000 people from Syria. Since the 1990s, Iraqis have been one of the largest Asian immigrant groups, with almost 70,000 people. In 2009, about 388,037 people in Sweden were born in an Asian country.

== Demographics ==
According to Statistics Sweden, as of 2020, there is a total 310,293 residents of Sweden who hold citizenship from countries in Asia and 798,328 who were born in any of the countries of Asia.

According to Statistics Sweden, as of 2016, there is a total of 8,541 foreign-born children and young adults aged 0–21 who are adopted in Sweden. Of these individuals, the most common countries of birth are China (3,977), South Korea (1,735), Colombia (1,438), Vietnam (1,241), and India (1,017).

As of 2020, Sweden's Asian Demographics include:

- Central Asian origins: 68,782 (Afghan, Kazakh, Kyrgyz, Tajik, Uzbek)
- East Asian origins: 51,449 (Chinese, Japanese, Korean, Mongolian)
- Southeast Asian origins: 81,556 (Filipino, Indonesian, Thai, Vietnamese)
- South Asian origins: 43,622 (Bangladeshis, Indian, Pakistani)
- West Asian origins: (Iraqis, Syrians, Iranians, Lebanese, etc.)

Population of the largest Asian communities in Sweden, by country of birth (Note: Although Statistics Sweden has described immigrants from Turkey as being "Asian immigrants", Statistics Sweden's continent and country appendix excludes Turkey, counting them as a non-EU, non-Nordic European country. Due to this, they are excluded from the total estimate.)
Ethnic Origins	Men	Women	Total
Syria	108,269	85,325	193,594
Iraq	78,760	67,680	146,440
Iran	42,864	38,437	81,301
Afghanistan	39,834	21,034	60,858
Thailand	9,598	34,741	44,339
India	22,979	19,811	42,790
China	14,743	21,280	36,023
Lebanon	15,912	12,973	28,885
Pakistan	12,523	8,649	21,172
Vietnam	9,662	11,464	21,126
Total population	355,144	321,394	676,538

== See also ==
- Arabs in Sweden
- Asian people
- Immigration to Sweden
- Buddhism in Sweden
- Burmese people in Sweden
- Chinese people in Sweden
- Swedish Indians
- Swedish Iranians
- Swedish Iraqis
- Kurds in Sweden
- Turks in Sweden

== External sources ==
- "Asian stereotypes offend - Lisa Sjöblom speaks out", Sverigesradio.se, 26 June 2015
- Nilsson, Åke (December 2004). Demografiska Rapporter 2004:5 - Efterkrigstidens invandring och utvandring [Demographic Reports 2004:5 - Immigration and emigration in the postwar period] (PDF) (in Swedish). Stockholm: Statistiska centralbyrån - National government publication. ISBN 91-618-1262-5. ISSN 0283-8788.
