= Burmese community in India =

Ethnic community

Total population
- 17,975 (2014)

Regions with significant populations
- Mizoram, Manipur, Delhi, Chennai, Visakhapatnam, Hyderabad, Bengaluru, Bhubaneswar, Raipur, Kolkata, Lucknow, Patna

Languages
- Burmese · English · Hindi

Religion
- Christianity · Buddhism · Islam · Hinduism

Related ethnic groups
- Burmese diaspora

The Burmese community in India consists of refugees, immigrants, and expatriates from Burma as well as Indian citizens of Burmese ancestry. The 2014 Myanmar Census enumerated 17,975 Burmese individuals living in India.

== Ethnicity ==
The Burmese refugee population in India is overwhelmingly from the Chin ethnic minority group, with smaller Kachin, Rakhine, and Bamar populations as well.

== Migration history ==
Following the 1962 Burmese coup d'état, 155,000 Burmese Indians were repatriated to India and resettled by the Indian government in 'Burma Colonies' in cities like Chennai, Tiruchirappalli and Madurai.

Myanmar, also known as Burma, has been entrenched in political and armed conflict between the repressive ruling military regime, political opponents, and ethnic groups – resulting in the displacement of over 3.5 million people. India, being a neighboring country, hosts a large and growing number of 100,000 Burmese refugees.

Chin refugees have been leaving Burma for over four decades to escape persistent human rights abuses committed by the Burmese army. Many experts believe that abuses became increasingly systematic and serious after the 1988 uprising in Burma, and this date does signal a growth in the numbers of refugees in India. However, there is also a sizable community of Chin refugees in India that have resided in the country since the 1970s, who played an important role in helping refugee communities adjust to their new surroundings.

Following the 2021 Myanmar coup d'état, more than 60,000 Chin people fled to Mizoram and Manipur, according to United Nations estimates.

== Distribution ==
Burmese refugees in India live primarily in two places: the Northeast states of Mizoram and, to a lesser extent, Manipur, and the capital city of New Delhi. Since India does not officially recognize Burmese as refugees, it is difficult to get a firm grasp on how many Burmese live in the country.

Estimates for the Northeast, where the refugee population is predominantly Chin, range from 50,000 to 100,000. UNHCR India has registered between 3,000 and 4,000 Burmese living in Delhi, also primarily Chin, and estimates that over 600 Burmese are finding their way to Delhi each month.

== Discrimination ==
While India generally tolerates the presence of Burmese refugees, they do not afford them any legal protection, leaving them vulnerable to harassment, discrimination, and deportation as the country is not a signatory to the 1951 Refugee Convention, nor does it have a domestic legal code to identify and protect refugees.

Without any formal recognition as refugees, the Chin community in Delhi suffer numerous challenges. The inability of many Chin refugees to communicate in either English or Hindi also subjects them to daily hardship.

== Notable people ==
- Sitt Nyein Aye – Burmese artist
- Helen Jairag Richardson – Indian film actress
- Lekha Washington -Indian film actress and model
- Pu Zoramthanga – Boxer
- U. A. Khader
- Usha Narayanan (born Tint Tint) – former First Lady of India
- Pessie Madan
- Samir Chaudhuri
- Ahalya Chari
- Essof Ashroff
- K. Deep
- Ahmed Mamsa
- Peston Padamji Ginwala
- S. N. Goenka
- Bhanumati Devi

== See also ==
- India–Myanmar relations
- Illegal immigration to India (Rohingya)
- Kha Maung Seik massacre of Hindus
