= Fresno Buddhist Temple =

Buddhist temple in California, U.S.

- Fresno Betsuin Buddhist Temple
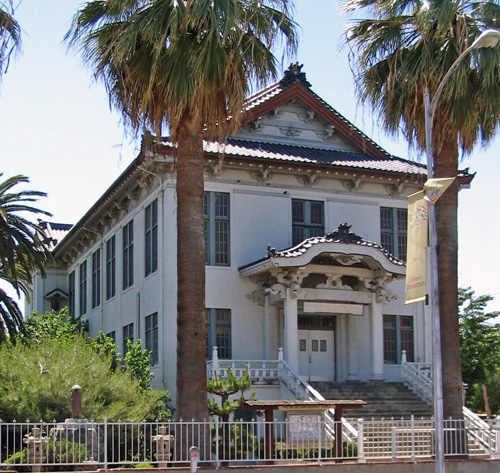

- Location within California

Religion
- Affiliation: Mahayana
- Status: Landmark

Location
- Location: 1340 Kern St, Fresno, California, 93706
- Country: United States
- Coordinates: 36.728280°N 119.794967°W

Architecture
- Founder: Rev. Fukyo Asaeda
- Completed: 1902

Website
- www.fresnobuddhisttemple.org

The Fresno Betsuin Buddhist Temple, founded in 1899, originally held services at this historic Kern Street building. In 2010, the congregation relocated to a new site in North Fresno, where it continues to operate to this day. This historic Kern Street building remains a designated landmark, and is now known as Mrauk Oo Dhamma Center (Burmese: မြောက်ဦးဓမ္မစင်တာ).

== History ==
During World War II the building was closed due to the internment of people of Japanese ancestry. This included United States citizens. After re-opening, the building served as a hostel and an education center, before eventually reopening as a temple, again.

Sometime during the temple's history, a bodhi tree was planted behind the annex building from a seedling descended from the Jaya Sri Maha Bodhi tree in Sri Lanka, which is said to descended from the original Mahabodhi Tree in Bodh Gaya, under which Gautama Buddha found enlightenment.

As the Japanese American congregation grew and evolved in the years following, the congregation purchased a new site in North Fresno located at 2690 E Alluvial Ave Fresno, CA 93720, and formally moved in 2010. After much deliberation, the historic downtown property was put up for sale in 2011.

A group of Burmese American physicians raised $750,000 to purchase the property in 2018 to serve the spiritual needs of the growing Burmese community in Fresno, and renamed the temple Mrauk Oo Dhamma in honor of their head monk, Mrauk Oo Sayadaw. As the new Burmese owners were moving into the property, they discovered a Burmese statue of Buddha in a storeroom. Apparently, the mayor of a Burmese town had visited Fresno in 1961 and presented it to the city as a gift. Mayor Selland gave it to the temple as the only Buddhist temple in town. Both the previous Japanese owners and the new Burmese owners agreed it should stay with Burmese congregation and that it was an auspicious sign for sale of the property.
