= Burmese people in Japan =

ဂျပန်နိုင်ငံရှိ မြန်မာလူများ 在日ミャンマー人 (Myanmar) (Japan)

Total population
- 182,567 (in December, 2025)

Regions with significant populations
- Tokyo (Shinjuku), Gunma (Tatebayashi), Nagoya

Languages
- Japanese, Burmese

Religion
- Buddhism · Shinto · Christianity (minority)

Related ethnic groups
- Burmese diaspora, Thais in Japan

Burmese people in Japan (Japanese: 在日ミャンマー人) form one of the significant foreign populations in Japan. In December 2025, there were 182,567 people of Myanmar descent living in Japan.

== Migration history ==
Prior to World War II, some Burmese students studied in Japan; these nationalist-oriented students became the core of the Burmese Independence Army set up by the Japanese prior to their invasion of Burma. During the Japanese occupation of Burma, Japan continued to provide scholarships for Burmese students to study in Japan.

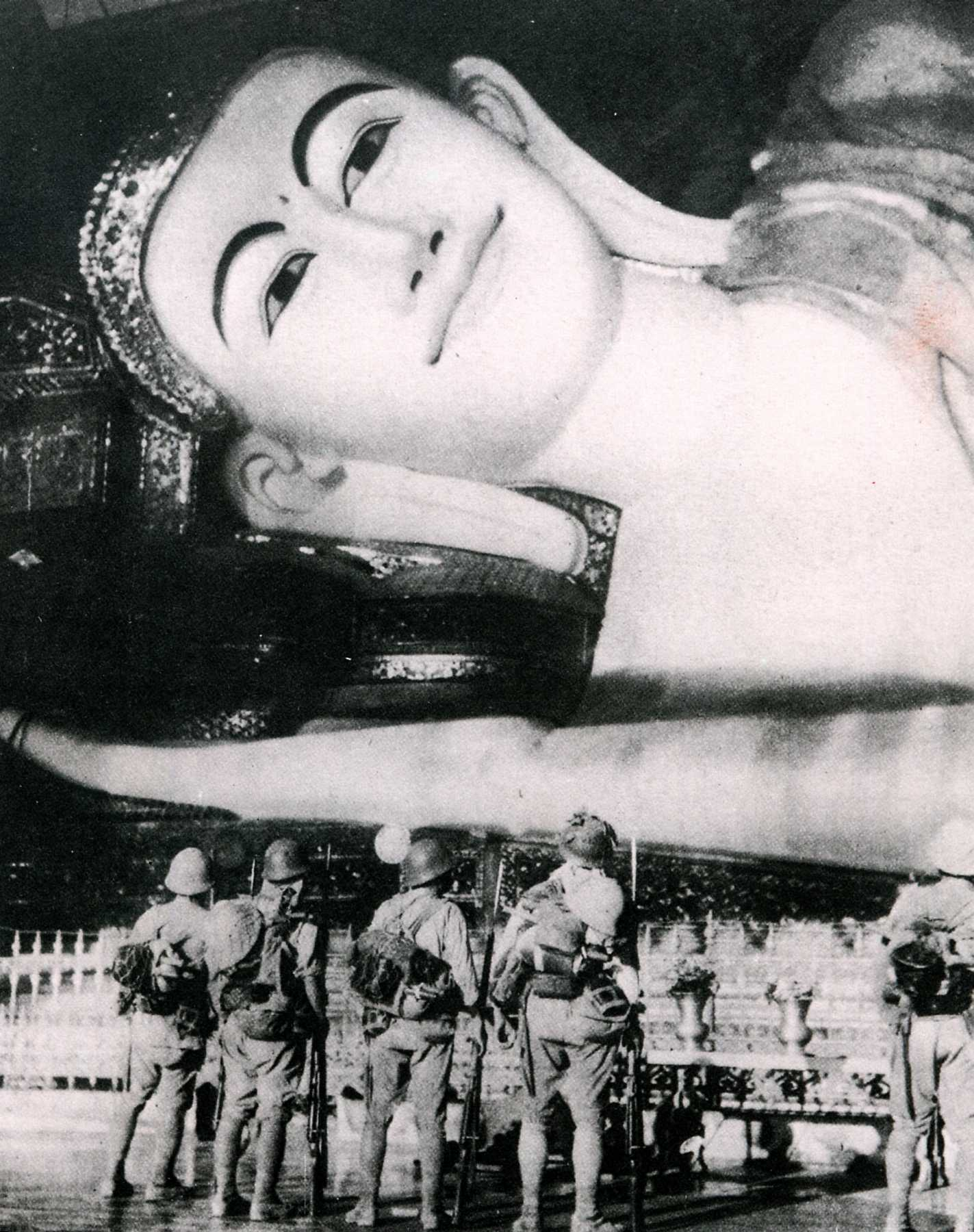
Japanese troops at Shwethalyaung Buddha during World War II

Since the 1990s, a new wave of Burmese migrants have come to Japan. Among their numbers are hundreds of activists who had been active in Burmese democracy movements. Initially, the Japanese government refused to recognize any of them as refugees; however, their policy softened after 1998. By August 2006, the government had recognized 116 Burmese in Japan as refugees, and given special stay permission to another 139. These comprised almost all of the official refugees in Japan, with the exception of a few Afghans and Kurds. In August 2010, the Japanese government agreed to accept for resettlement in Japan five families of Karen refugees from Myanmar, numbering 27 people; an additional family of five people chose to decline resettlement in Japan due to the country's high cost of living. The refugees had formerly been living at the Mera refugee camp in Thailand, and had been taking resettlement classes held by the International Organization for Migration.

Takadanobaba in Tokyo is sometimes nicknamed "Little Yangon" which is home to numerous Burmese restaurants, grocery stores, shops, and community organizations serving both the Burmese diaspora and local Japanese citizens.

Mingalaba, which opened in 1997, is the oldest Burmese restaurant in the area. Local shops such as Mother House cater largely to Burmese residents, offering regional ingredients and clothing. Burmese women often help explain traditional products to visitors.

== Community organisations ==
The first Burmese political organisation founded in Japan was the Burma Association in Japan, established in 1988. In 2000, a number of Burmese dissident groups in Japan, including the Burmese Association in Japan, the Burma Youth Volunteer Association, the Students Organization for Liberation of Burma, merged to form a single organisation, the League for Democracy in Burma.

Due to the Japanese government's limited assistance to refugees, Japanese voluntary civil society organisations have played a large role in providing aid to Burmese migrants, especially in the field of health care. Organisations established by Burmese migrants or providing aid to them include the People's Forum on Burma, the Lawyers Group for Burmese Refugees in Japan, and the Federation of Workers' Unions of Burmese Citizens in Japan. Burmese associations have a strong base of support among mainstream Japanese; the umbrella organisation Burma Office in Japan is especially close to RENGO (the Japanese Confederation of Trade Unions), which provides them with financial support.

Burmese in Japan are also organised in non-political associations and activities. Ahhara, the first Burmese library in Japan, was established in Itabashi, Tokyo in 2000, with the aim of collecting hard-to-obtain books and historical writings. Its name means "Food for Thought" in Burmese. In 2004, the library was moved to Shinjuku to be more conveniently accessible to the Burmese community; its name was also changed to Moe Thauk Kye, which means "Morning Star". The library is staffed by 14 volunteers. Burmese living in Tokyo organise a Thingyan (Burmese New Year Water Festival) celebration, which draws about 5,000 participants annually.

Rakhine people in Japan are organized under groups like Arakan Union-Japan, Arakan Social Association of Japan, and Arakan National Democratic Party – Japan. Events such as the Rakhine Thingyan Festival and the annual Fall of the Arakan Kingdom commemoration are held. The groups actively protest in Tokyo, lobby Japanese NGOs and government officials, and align with the Arakan Army (AA).

There are about 250 Rohingya refugees in Tatebayashi, Gunma.

The Burmese Chin community numbers hundreds across prefectures like Tokyo, Chiba, and Nagoya. Several Chin-led or Chin-affiliated groups, such as the Chin Community of Japan (CCJ) and the Chin Youth Organization of Japan (CYO‑JP) are active in Japan.

The World Peace Pagoda in Moji, Kitakyushu, is a Myanmar-style Buddhist pagoda built in 1958 to honor war victims in the World War and promote peace between Japan and Myanmar. It houses Theravada Buddhist relics and is maintained with the involvement of Burmese monks. The pagoda overlooks the Kanmon Strait and is open to visitors for cultural and religious activities.

Burmese-Japanese co-produced films have appeared occasionally since the 1930s. Early collaborations include the 1935 film Japan Yin Thwe, while more recent examples are the 2003 drama Thway and the 2020 musical drama Gandaba: Strings of a Broken Harp.

== Notable people ==
- Amisa Miyazaki, singer (half-Burmese)
- Asuka Saitō, actress (half-Burmese)
- Ten Miyagi, footballer (half-Burmese)
- Win Morisaki, singer
- U Kyaw Din, football coach and one of Japanese football team Hall of Fame
- Ten Miyagi, footballer (half-Burmese)

== Sources ==
- Banki, Susan (2006), "Burmese Refugees in Tokyo: Livelihoods in the Urban Environment", Journal of Refugee Studies, 19 (3): 328–344, doi:10.1093/jrs/fel015
- Soe Win Shein (June 2006), "'Moe Thauk Kye', the First Burmese Library in Japan" (PDF), Library Services to Multicultural Populations, World Library and Information Congress
- Nemoto, Kei (2007), "Between Democracy and Economic Development: Japan's Policy towards Burma/Myanmar Then and Now", in Narayanan Ganesan; Kyaw Yin Hlaing (eds.), Myanmar: state, society, and ethnicity, Institute of Southeast Asian Studies, Hiroshima City University, ISBN 978-981-230-434-6
- JFA Hall of Fame Inductee|Japan Football Hall of Fame|JFA|Japan Football Association
