= Ezra Solomon =

American economist

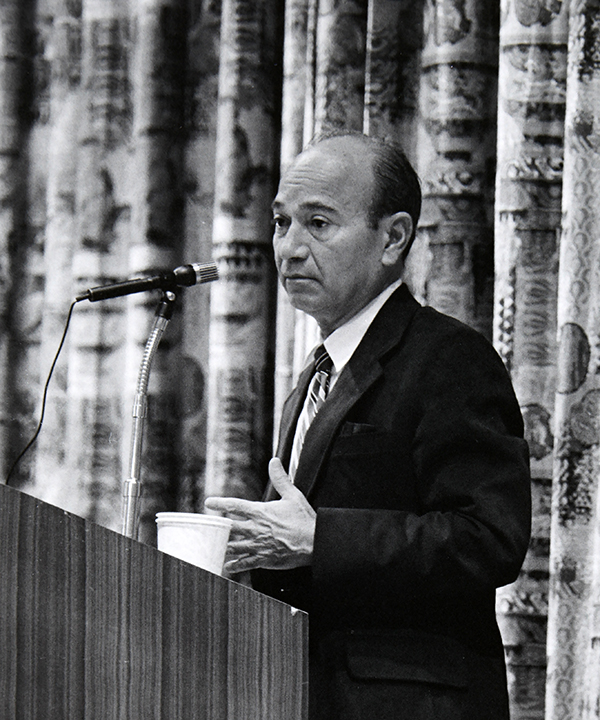
- Ezra Solomon speaking at Georgia Tech 1979
- Born: March 20, 1920; Rangoon, British Burma
- Died: December 9, 2002 (aged 82)

Academic background
- Education: University of Rangoon; University of Chicago

Academic work
- Institutions: Stanford University
- Main interests: Economics

Ezra Solomon (March 20, 1920 – December 9, 2002) was an influential US economist and professor of economics at Stanford University. As a member of the Council of Economic Advisors (1971–1973) during the Nixon administration, he was seen as having contributed significantly to the change in US monetary policy which resulted in the end of the gold standard for US currency and of the Bretton Woods system of exchange rates.

== Early life and education ==
Solomon was born in Rangoon (now Yangon), British Burma to parents of Burmese British Jewish heritage. He graduated with a first class honours degree in economics from the University of Rangoon in 1940, but fled the country when the Japanese invaded Burma in 1941. Solomon served as a lieutenant in the Burma Division of the Royal Navy Volunteer Reserve (RNVR) from 1942 to 1947. After World War II, he was sent to the University of Chicago as a Burma State Scholar, where he earned a PhD in economics in 1950.

== Post-graduate career ==
During his graduate studies, Solomon joined the faculty of the University of Chicago's Graduate School of Business (now Booth School of Business), serving as an assistant professor of finance from 1951 to 1955, and a professor from 1957 to 1961. In 1961, he was recruited by Ernest C. Arbuckle become founding director of the International Center for the Advancement of Management Education (ICAME). Solomon returned to teaching full-time in 1963, and became the Stanford Graduate School of Business's first Dean Witter Distinguished Professor of Finance. Throughout his career, he wrote 13 books and over 100 papers. Solomon retired in 1990 as an emeritus member of the finance faculty.

From 1965 until the early 1970s, Solomon was the managing editor of Prentice-Hall's Foundations of Finance, an influential book series in accounting and finance. He was well known for work that helped shape modern theories of corporate finance. His most well-known book, The Theory of Financial Management (1963) revolutionized the study of finance from a descriptive to a rigorous, theory-based discipline founded on mathematics.

Solomon was recruited by economist Paul McCracken, then chairman, to serve on President Richard Nixon's Council of Economic Advisers Solomon served on the council from September 9, 1971, until his resignation on March 31, 1973.

== Personal life ==
While studying at the University of Chicago, Solomon wed Janet Lorraine Cameron on May 7, 1949. The couple were married for 53 years, before Cameron died on November 14, 2002, less than a month before his death. The couple had 3 daughters, Catherine, Ming, and Lorna. In Fall 1962, Solomon and his wife purchased a historic 1914 Tudor-style country cottage on Santa Ynez Drive in Stanford, California. He lived there until his death in 2002.

== Death ==
Solomon died of a stroke on December 9, 2002, at his home in Stanford, California.

== Bibliography ==
- "Ezra Solomon, Who Shaped Finance Theory, Dies at 82"; Lewis, Paul; The New York Times; December 19, 2002 - obituary
- Johan Van Overtveldt (2007). The Chicago School: How the University of Chicago Assembled the Thinkers Who Revolutionized Economics and Business. Agate Publishing. ISBN 978-1-57284-649-4.
- "Ezra Solomon". JSTOR.
