= Burmese in Thailand =

- (Myanmar) (Thailand)
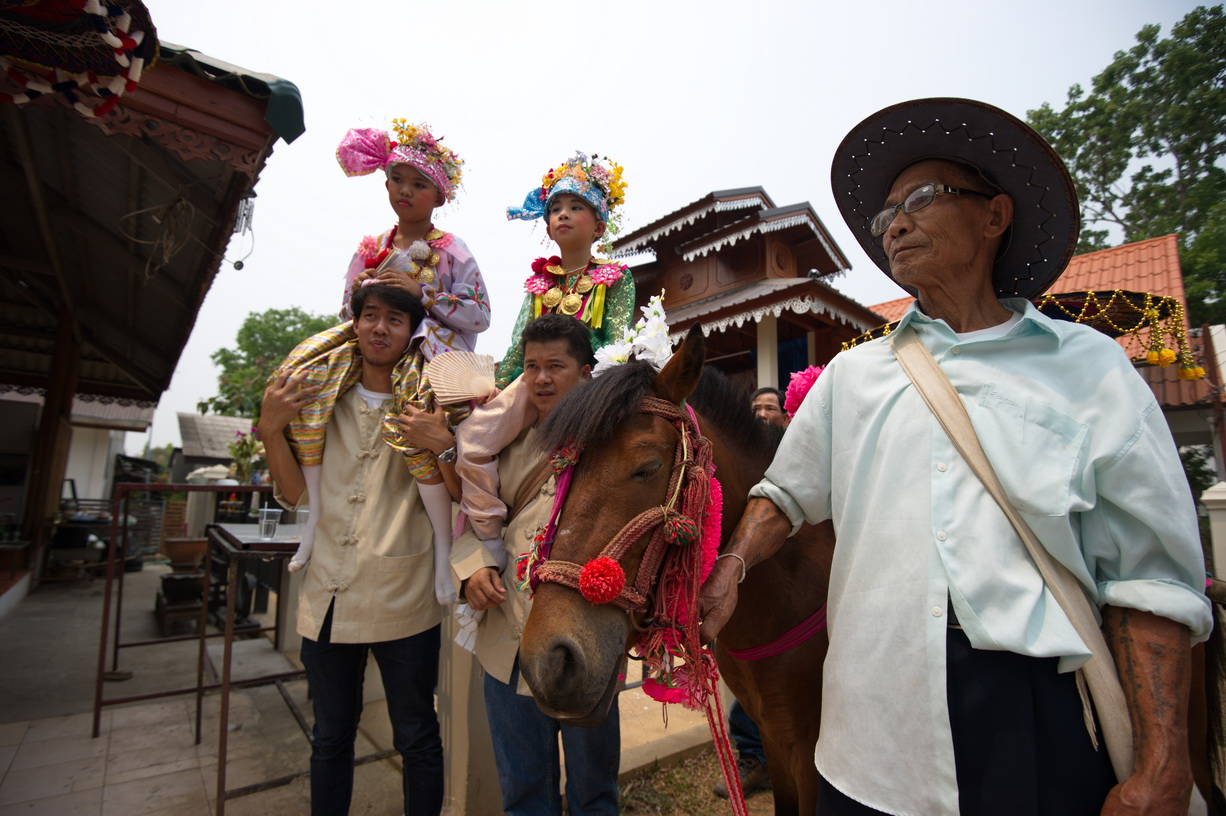
- Ethnic Shans celebrating the Poy Sang Long Festival in Mae Hong Son

Total population
- 1,418,472 (2014)

Regions with significant populations
- Samut Sakhon; Mae Hong Son; Tak; Bangkok; Chiang Mai; Ranong

Languages
- Burmese, Mon, Shan, Northern Thai and various languages of Myanmar (native), Central Thai (lingua franca)

Religion
- Theravada Buddhism; Christianity; Islam

Related ethnic groups
- Burmese diaspora, Bamar, Karen, Mon, Shan

Burmese in Thailand (Thai: ชาวพม่าในไทย, Burmese: ထိုင်းနိုင်ငံရှိမြန်မာများ) constitute Thailand's largest migrant population. According to the 2014 Myanmar census, 1,418,472 former Burmese residents, including 812,798 men and 605,674 women, were living in Thailand, constituting about 70% of Burma's overseas population. Burmese in Thailand tend to fall into three categories: professional migrants working in the business or professional sectors, laborers working in low-skilled professions, and refugees fleeing conflict.

Migrant workers tend to hold low-skilled jobs in the fishing and seafood processing, construction, garment, and domestic service industries. Macquarie University estimates that the average annual remittances from Thailand to Burma exceed US$300 million. The movement of Burmese nationals into Thailand began in the 1970s, following the 1962 Burmese coup d'état and resulting economic decline from implementation of the Burmese Way to Socialism, and ongoing civil conflicts. Burmese migrants contribute tremendously to the Thai economy, contributing between 5 and 6.2% of Thailand's GDP.

Samut Sakhon province is home to Thailand's largest Burmese migrant community, representing about 200,000 Burmese migrants. Other large Burmese communities are present in Mae Sot and Ranong.

In 2003, the Thai and Burmese governments signed a memorandum of understanding to formally recognize this labor migration flow and legalize migration through a government program to recruit workers directly from Burma, and to use a nationality verification process whereby migrant workers receive a temporary passport, an identity certificate, a visa to remain in Thailand for two years, and a change of work status to legal.

There are also roughly 150,000 Burmese refugees living at 9 official camps on the Thailand–Myanmar border. The largest such camp is Mae La refugee camp. In 2014, the Thai government announced plans to repatriate Burmese refugees who have been living in border camps for the past two decades.

== See also ==
- Myanmar–Thailand relations
