= Burmese diaspora =

Total population
- c. 3.2 million

Regions with significant populations
- Thailand: 1,418,472 (2014)
- China: 351,000 (2020)
- United States: 322,000 (2023)
- Malaysia: 303,996 (2014)
- Saudi Arabia: 268,000 (2020)
- Singapore: 200,000 (2021)
- Japan: 134,574 (2024)
- Australia: 62,096 (2021)
- India: 50,000 (2003)
- Taiwan: 40,000 (2017)
- South Korea: 27,000 (2022)
- Canada: 9,150 (2021)
- United Kingdom: 7,514 (2021)
- Norway: 4,307 (2022)
- New Zealand: 3,453 (2023)
- Denmark: 2,666 (2022)
- Finland: 2,154 (2021)
- Netherlands: 1,683 (2022)
- Sweden: 1,646 (2024)
- Germany: 481 (2024)
- Brazil: 377 (2024)

Languages
- Burmese, Kuki-Chin, Karen, Arakanese, Sal, and other languages of Myanmar

Religion
- Majority: Theravada Buddhism; Minority: Christianity; Islam; Hinduism

Burmese diaspora refers to citizens of Burma (Myanmar) who have moved abroad, regardless of ethnicity. Burma contains over 100 different ethnic groups, though the term "Burmese" can be used to refer to the Bamar ethnicity. Myanmar has experienced significant waves of population displacement, due to decades of internal conflict, poverty, and political persecution, often triggered by political events like the 1962 Burmese coup d'état, the 8888 Uprising and ensuing 1988 coup d'état, and most recently, the 2021 Myanmar coup d'état. The diaspora is broadly categorised into 3 groups: religious minorities and ethnic groups who have fled conflict areas, elites seeking more politically stable environments, and others seeking improved educational and economic opportunities. In 2021, 1.2 million refugees and asylum seekers were from Myanmar, making them the world's fifth largest refugee population, behind Syria, Venezuela, Afghanistan, and South Sudan.

The diaspora in neighbouring Asian countries generally work in blue collar sectors (e.g., agriculture, fishing, manufacturing, etc.) while increasing numbers of white collar workers have resettled in the Western world. The significant brain drain of entrepreneurs, professionals and intellectuals resulting from continued decline in Myanmar's sociopolitical environment have had significant ramifications on the country's economic development, particularly in terms of human capital. The recent military coup in 2021 has resulted in the exodus of repatriates of Burmese nationality (e.g., professionals, executives and investors) as well as expatriates alike, impacting the country's emerging start-up scene.

== By country ==
Thailand is the most popular destination for Burmese migrants. Between 1.5 and 2 million Burmese nationals live in neighboring Thailand, the largest destination for Burmese migrants. Some half a million work in Malaysia. Burmese migrants also make up the largest expatriate group in China, numbering over 350,000. Significant numbers also reside in United Kingdom, Japan followed by Singapore, Indonesia, Australia, Bangladesh, India, Ireland and the United States.

Also included are many Anglo-Burmese, primarily in Australia, the UK, New Zealand, Canada and the US.

The Rohingya refugees have also formed a large portion of the Burmese refugee diaspora, experiencing ethnic and religious persecution in Myanmar for decades. After the 2017 Rohingya genocide, hundreds of thousands have fled to Bangladesh, other countries in Southeast Asia, including Malaysia, Indonesia, and the Philippines.

=== Australia ===
As of the 2021 Australian Census, there were approximately 62,096 individuals in Australia who identified as having Burmese ancestry, encompassing both first-generation migrants and Australian-born descendants. The Burmese Australian community is ethnically diverse, including Bamar, Karen, Chin, Rohingya, and other groups. Geographically, the community is concentrated in Victoria (36.3%), Western Australia (23.9%), and New South Wales (19.8%). Religious affiliations vary, with significant proportions identifying as Baptist (33.1%), Buddhist (25.2%), Catholic (12.3%), and Muslim (9.7%).

Many Burmese Australians arrived through humanitarian programs, often after extended periods in refugee camps in countries like Thailand and Malaysia. The community observes various cultural and religious festivals, such as Thingyan, Thadingyut, and Chin National Day.

=== Bangladesh ===
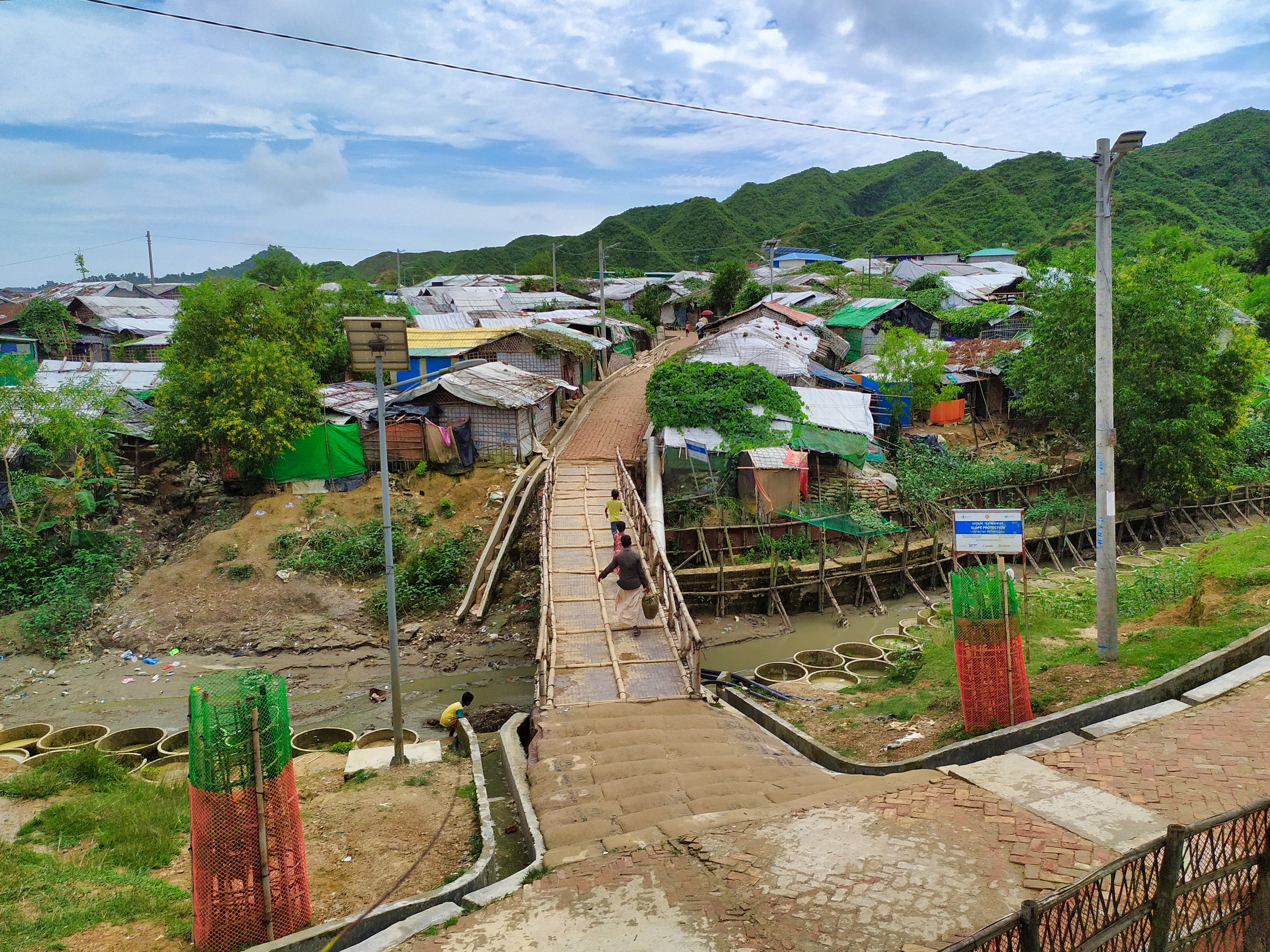
A refugee camp in Bangladesh

Burmese citizens belonging to ethnic groups such as the Bamar, Chin, Kachin, and Shan are generally not part of the diaspora in Bangladesh. The majority of displaced Rohingya people who are not counted as Burmese people or citizens by the Myanmar government have sought refuge in the country. There are two officially registered refugee camps located in Ukhiya (sub-district) and Teknaf (sub-district) in Cox's Bazar District. Violence in Myanmar escalated in 2017, rapidly increasingly the number of Rohingya refugees in Bangladesh. According to the UN Refugee Agency (UNHCR), more than 723,000 Rohingya have fled to Bangladesh since 25 August 2017.

Bangladesh blamed the refugees for crime and 2012 Ramu violence in Cox's Bazar. Bangladesh also follows a policy of making the country unwelcoming for Rohingya refugees. In 2015, the Bangladesh government proposed a relocation plan for the Rohingya refugees in Bangladesh to the remote island of Bhasan Char in the Bay of Bengal. The plan was pushed back following criticism by human rights activists and the UNHCR.

After the escalation of civil war in Myanmar, then Prime Minister of Bangladesh, Sheikh Hasina, declared that 35,000 Rohingya were transferred to Bhasan Char to "keep Rohingya youth away from criminal activities." She also emphasized the difficulty of repatriating Rohingya back to Myanmar due to the civil war, and preventing foreign armed groups from using Bangladesh as a guerrilla sanctuary.

=== China ===
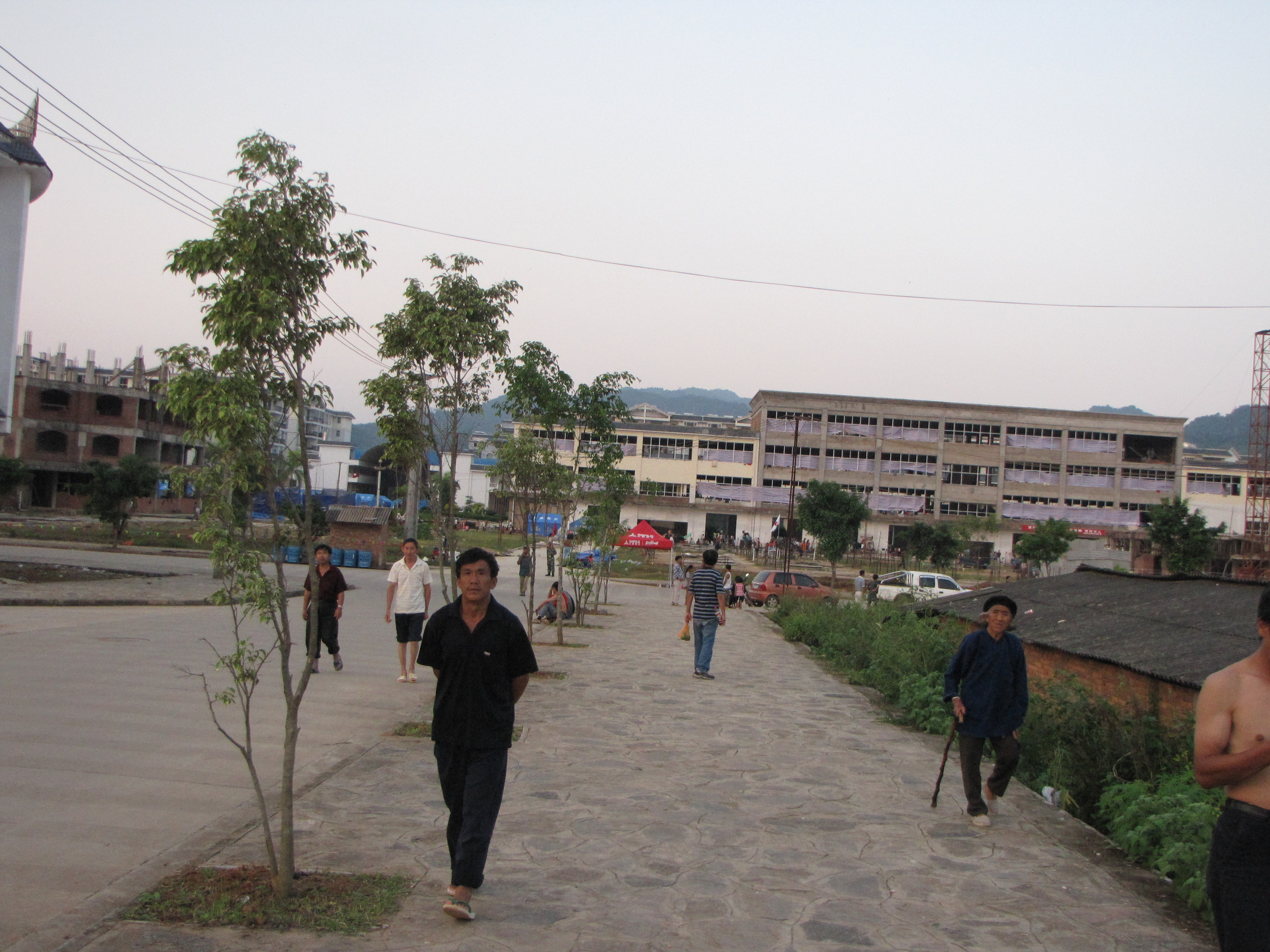
Burmese refugees in Zhenkang County, Yunnan after the 2009 Kokang incident

Burmese people in China mainly live in Yunnan, which borders Myanmar. According to the 2020 Chinese census, a total of 351,000 Burmese nationals lived in China, making them the largest group of expatriates in China. The boundary area is inhabited by non-Han and non-Burmese peoples, and has been traditionally kept as a buffer region between the various Chinese and Burmese empires.

In addition of legal residents, many Burmese people were smuggled to China and found jobs in sweatshops often located in East China. Many Burmese nationals live or work in Yunnan, often in border cities like Ruili. Before the outbreak of COVID-19, 50,000 Burmese nationals crossed the border every day, including those working in Chinese border cities. In 2022, around a thousand Myanmar migrant workers were being held in Chinese detention centers. The vast majority of the detainees were undocumented illegal border crossers held in Yunnan after overstaying their six-day tourist visas. A hundred other Myanmar nationals were held in Guangdong province, some arrested during factory raids by Chinese police.

Yunnan province sheltered tens of thousands of refugees during periods of intensified clashes between Myanmar's military and ethnic armed organisations throughout the 2010s. Following the 2015 Kokang offensive in Myanmar, many Burmese nationals fled across the border to China. According to the United Nations, the conflict drove 70,000 people across the border into China with 27,000 remaining in China until 2016. Renewed clashes in Kokang in 2017 sent at least 20,000 people to enter border camps set up in China. The refugees received humanitarian assistance from the Chinese government. During the current phase of intensifying civil war, China no longer allows Myanmar refugees or asylum seekers, many of Myanmar's internally displaced people (IDPs) conduct cross-border trade as border residents. The Chinese government continues to use a localized model of border control to prevent a large influx of refugees through providing cross-border livelihoods for displaced Burmese nationals on the border.

Yunnan has also become a "hot spot" for human trafficking since 2008 with instances of transnational marriage, mail-order brides and marriage migration between Myanmar and China have become more prevalent in Yunnan.

=== India ===
The 2014 Myanmar Census enumerated 17,975 Burmese individuals living in India. This figure excludes 155,000 Burmese Indians were repatriated to India following the 1962 Burmese coup d'état. These Burmese Indians were resettled by the Indian government in 'Burma Colonies' in cities like Chennai, Tiruchirappalli and Madurai.

Burmese refugees from Internal conflict in Myanmar who have migrated to India live primarily in two places: the Northeast states of Mizoram and, to a lesser extent, Manipur, and the capital city of New Delhi. Since India does not officially recognize Burmese as refugees, it is difficult to get a firm grasp on how many Burmese live in the country. The Burmese refugee population in India is overwhelmingly from the Chin ethnic minority group, with smaller Kachin, Rakhine, and Bamar populations as well.

=== Japan ===
In December 2024, there were 134,574 Burmese people living in Japan. Prior to World War II, some Burmese students studied in Japan; these nationalist-oriented students became the core of the Burmese Independence Army set up by the Japanese prior to their invasion of Burma. During the Japanese occupation of Burma, Japan continued to provide scholarships for Burmese students to study in Japan. Since the 1990s, a new wave of Burmese migrants have come to Japan. Many are residing in the country illegally. Among their numbers are hundreds of activists who had been active in Burmese democracy movements. Initially, the Japanese government refused to recognise any of them as refugees; however, their policy softened after 1998. By 2006, the government had recognised 116 Burmese in Japan as refugees, and given special stay permission to another 139. These comprised almost all of the official refugees in Japan, with the exception of a few Afghans and Kurds. In 2010, the Japanese government agreed to accept for resettlement in Japan five families of Karen refugees from Myanmar. There are a few hundred Rohingyas in Tatebayashi, Gunma.

The first Burmese political organisation founded in Japan was the Burma Association in Japan, established in 1988, followed by many others. Burmese living in Tokyo organise a Thingyan celebration, which draws about 5,000 participants annually. Various civil society organisations established by Burmese migrants additionally provide aid to refugees and workers.

=== Malaysia ===
Burmese in Malaysia mostly comprise manual labourers and refugees. The 2014 Myanmar Census enumerated 303,996 Burmese individuals living in Malaysia. As of November 2014, there are around 139,200 Burmese refugees registered under UNHCR for which 50,620 are Chins, 40,070 are Rohingyas, 12,160 Panthays and 7,440 others are Rakhines/Arakanese. However, the Malaysian government does not officially recognise all newly arrived refugees as it may encourage more to enter Malaysia as Malaysian officials noted they may become a threat to national security.

=== New Zealand ===
As of the 2013 New Zealand Census, there were 2,187 individuals identifying as Burmese. They primarily reside in Auckland, Wellington, and Nelson. Many arrived as refugees from camps along the Thai-Myanmar border, with significant numbers from the Karen, Kayah, Chin, and Rakhine ethnic groups. Between 2004 and 2014, Burmese nationals constituted nearly half of all refugees granted residence under New Zealand's quota program, with 1,901 approvals during that period.

=== Singapore ===
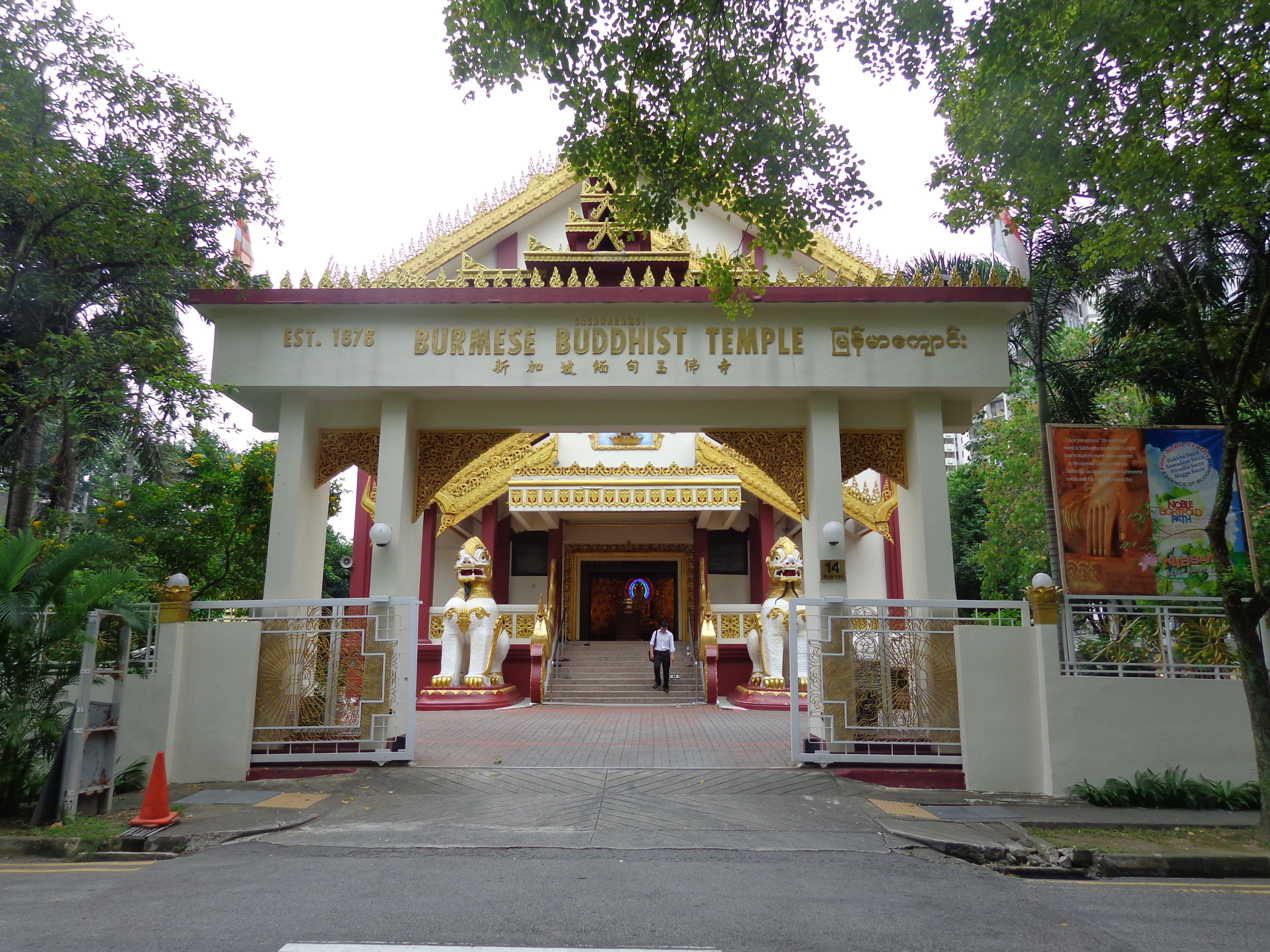
Burmese Buddhist Temple in Singapore

As of 2021, there are an estimated 200,000 Burmese nationals comprising students, healthcare workers, domestic helpers, and skilled professionals in Singapore.

The community is centered around the Burmese Buddhist Temple in Novena, which was established in 1875. Peninsula Plaza is often referred to as "Little Myanmar" which serves as a cultural hub with Burmese eateries, shops, and services. The community observes their traditional festivals there, such as Thingyan and Thadingyut.

=== South Korea ===
Around 27,000 Burmese nationals reside in South Korea, forming one of the country's largest Southeast Asian communities. Many are migrant workers employed in manufacturing and agriculture, around 4,000 under the Employment Permit System (EPS), while others are students, asylum seekers or refugees. The Karen ethnic group constitutes a significant portion of this population, with over 140 Karen refugees resettled through a UNHCR-supported program between 2015 and 2017.

In 2025, Yeongyang County announced plans to accept additional Karen families to address local population decline. Bupyeong District in Incheon has emerged as a cultural hub, often referred to as "Myanmartown" since it has a lot of Burmese restaurants, grocery stores, and Buddhist temples.

=== Thailand ===
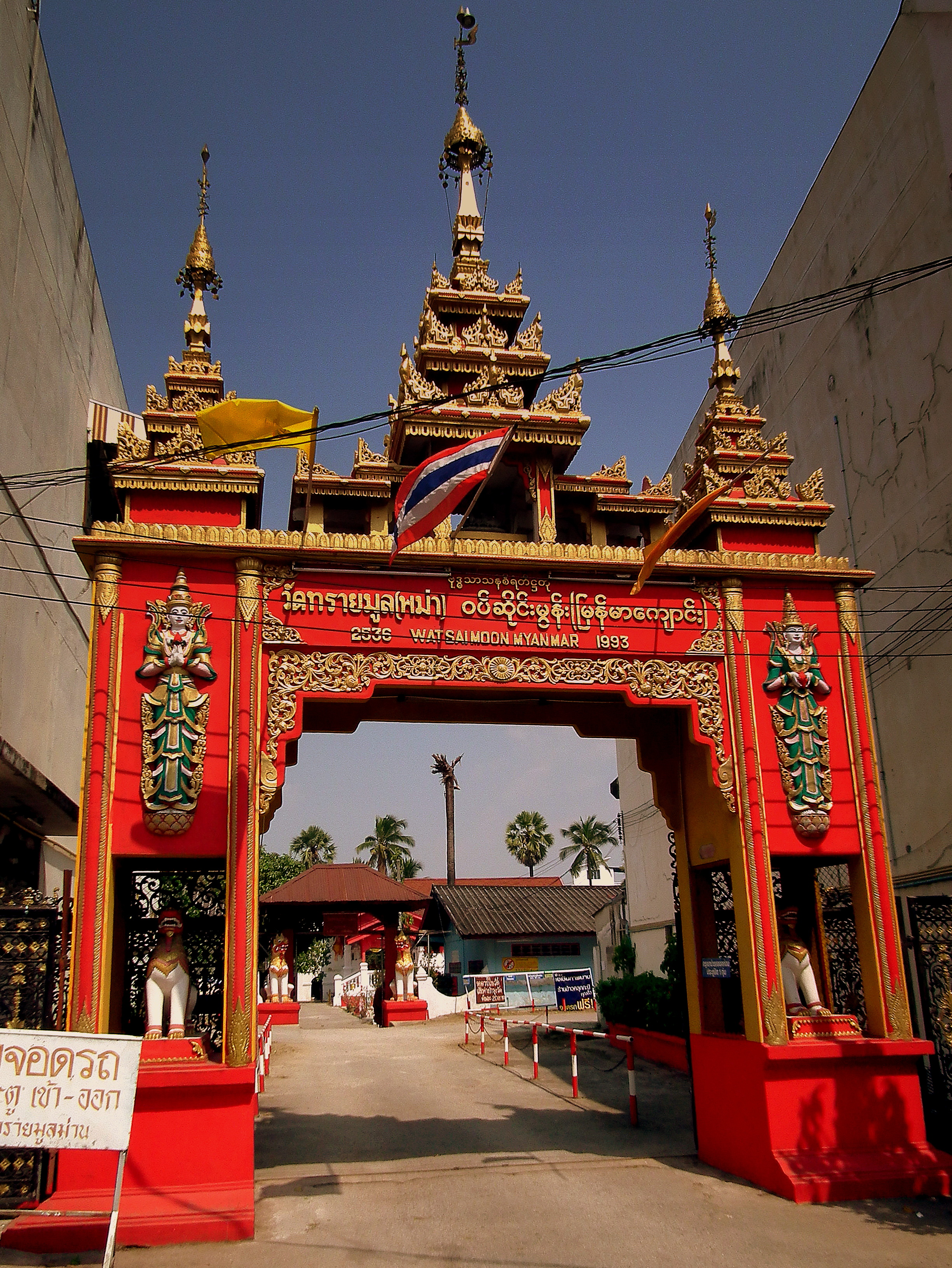
Burmese monastery in Chaing Mai, Thailand

Burmese in Thailand constitute Thailand's largest migrant population. According to the 2014 Myanmar Census, 1,418,472 former Burmese residents, including 812,798 men and 605,674 women, were living in Thailand, constituting about 70% of Burma's overseas population. Burmese in Thailand tend to fall into three categories: professional migrants working in the business or professional sectors, laborers working in low-skilled professions, and refugees fleeing conflict. Samut Sakhon province is home to Thailand's largest Burmese migrant community. Other large Burmese communities reside in on the border towns of Mae Sot and Ranong.

Migrant workers tend to hold low-skilled jobs in the fishing and seafood processing, construction, garment, and domestic service industries. Macquarie University estimates that the average annual remittances from Thailand to Burma exceed US$300 million. Burmese migrants contribute 5 to 6.2% of Thailand's GDP.

The movement of Burmese nationals into Thailand began in the 1970s, following the 1962 Burmese coup d'état and resulting economic decline from implementation of the Burmese Way to Socialism, and ongoing civil conflicts. In 2003, the Thai and Burmese governments signed a memorandum of understanding to formally recognize this labor migration flow and legalize migration through a government program to recruit workers directly from Burma.

There are also roughly 150,000 Burmese refugees living at 9 official camps on the Thai–Burmese border. The largest such camp is Mae La refugee camp.

=== United Kingdom ===
Migrants from both the Bamar and Karen ethnic groups constitute parts of Burmese communities in the United Kingdom. A large proportion of Burmese people who migrated to the country before 2011 were from the ethnic minority group of Karens, who sought to flee the military rule in Burma which was formed and led by ethnic Burmans.

Between 2005 and 2008, over two hundred Burmese individuals resettled in Sheffield, England. Arriving via Heathrow airport in the mid-2000s, most of the first Burmese migrants were women and children who had been living in camps along Myanmar's border with Thailand before resettlement in the UK. According to the Sheffield City Council, asylum seekers from Myanmar have been particularly relocated to the Yorkshire and the Humber region due to the "State persecution of minority groups and political activists" in the Southeast Asian country.

=== United States ===
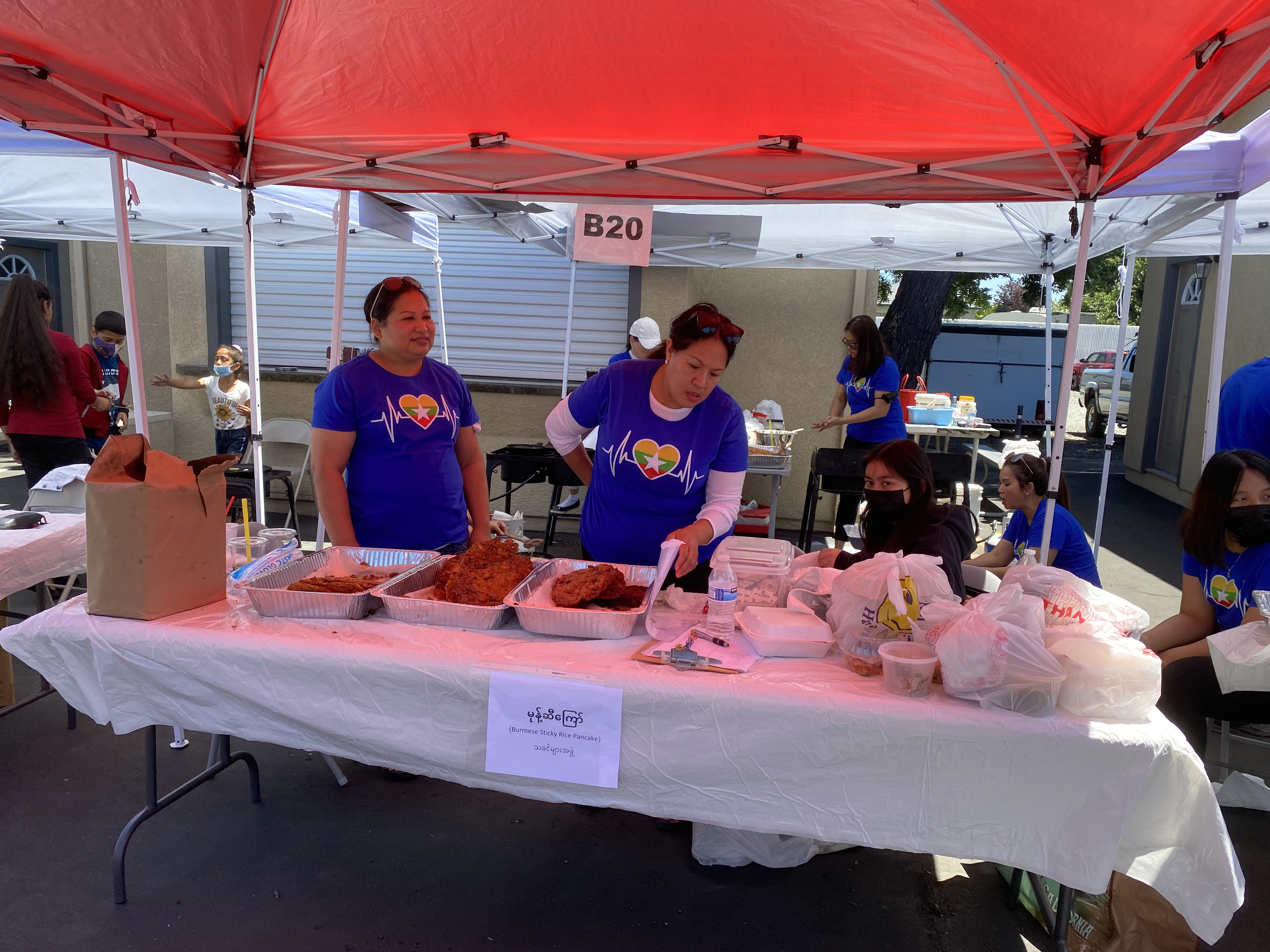
A food stall at a Burmese fundraising event, California 2022

Burmese Americans are Americans of full or partial Burmese ancestry, encompassing individuals of all ethnic backgrounds with ancestry in present-day Myanmar (or Burma), regardless of specific ethnicity. As a subgroup of Asian Americans, Burmese Americans have largely integrated into the broader Southeast Asian and South Asian American communities.

Indiana had both the largest Burmese community and highest percentage of Burmese of any state. Indianapolis, Minneapolis-Saint Paul, and Fort Wayne are home to the largest Burmese American populations.

Following the 2010 census, "Burmese" became a distinct ethnic category (previously they were categorized as "other Asians.") From 2010 to 2021, the population more than doubled. Following the 2021 February Coup, waves of Burmese have fled the junta, contributing to a surge in growth. According to the Burmese American Community Institute, as of August 2023, the Burmese American population stands at 322,000.

== Notable people ==
Some notable people include Aung San Suu Kyi, U Thant, and Thant Myint-U.

Kler Heh, British footballer was born into a Karen-refugee camp across the border in Thailand before being resettled in Yorkshire age 10, went on to sign a professional contract with Sheffield United.

Usha Narayanan (born Tint Tint) – former First Lady of India
