= Eastern Pwo people =

Subgroup of the Karen ethnic groups from southeast Myanmar

The Eastern Pwo (Burmese: အရှေ့ပိုးကရင်မျိုးနွယ်စု or ဖလုံမူထောင်း or ဖၠုံမူထင်း) are a subgroup of the Karen ethnic groups who live in the southeast of Myanmar. The Eastern Pwo Karen is from Karen State. Most of them live in Mon State and Tanintharyi Region. This group has a total of 271,200 members worldwide. The Eastern Pwo people usually call by adding Saw in front of male names, and Nan in front of female names. Their primary language is Eastern Pwo language and most of them practice Theravada Buddhism and Ethnoreligion. Ethnoreligion is a big part of the Eastern Pwo people's cultural identity, and conversion is basically the same as assimilating into a different culture. Many of them migrate to Thai-Burmese border and live there as a refugees for many decades due to conflict in the Karen State.

== See also ==
- Karen people
- Karen Baptist Convention
- Karen Baptist Theological Seminary
- Karen people in the Andaman Islands
