= S'gaw people =

Karen စှီၤ/ကညီ
- Karen flag

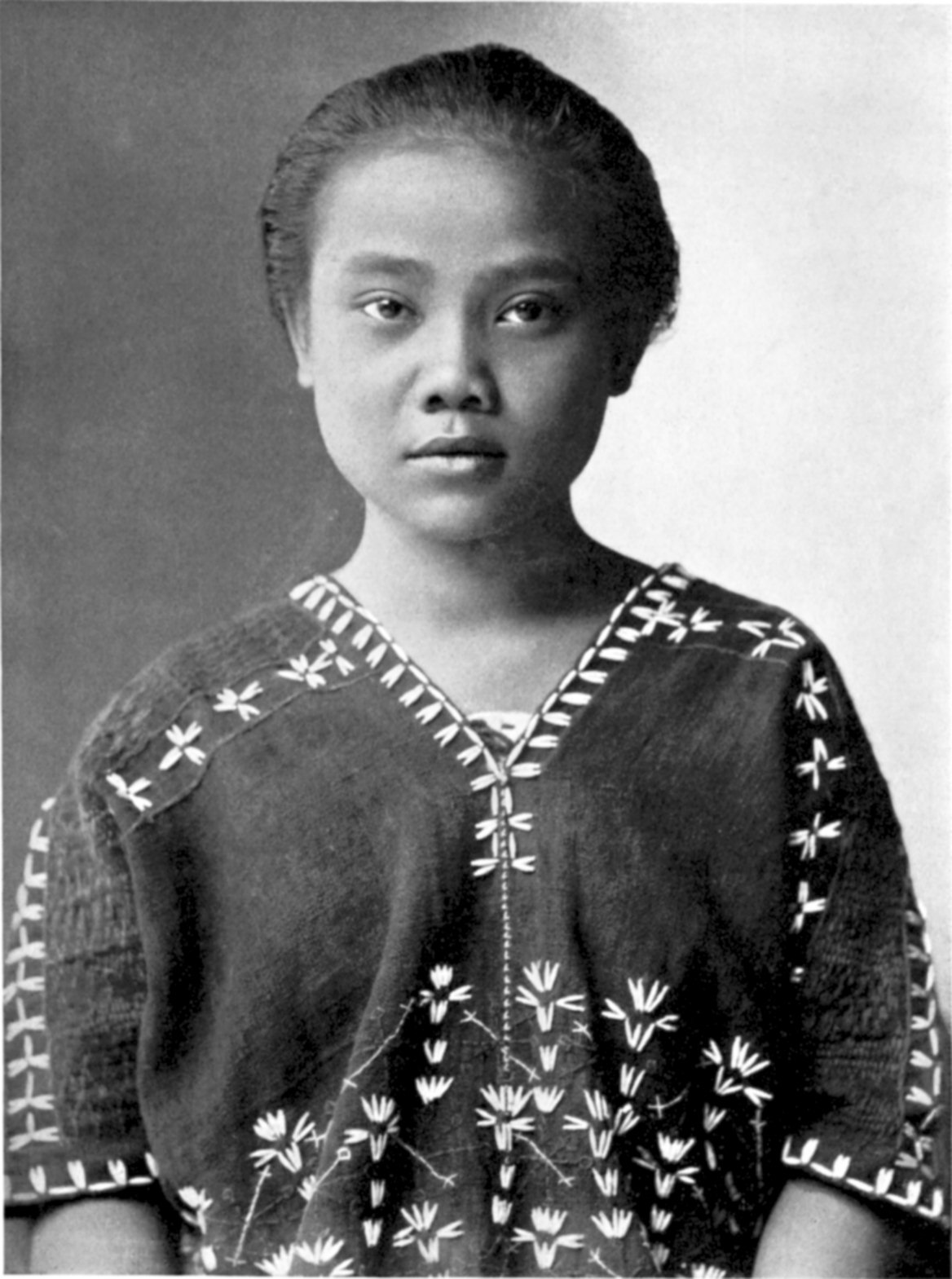
- A S'gaw Karen woman in a traditional dress

Regions with significant populations
- Myanmar: 2,028,000
- Thailand: 216,000
- United States: 60,000
- Australia: 9,000
- India: 2,200

Languages
- S'gaw Karen

Religion
- Christianity; Buddhism; folk religion

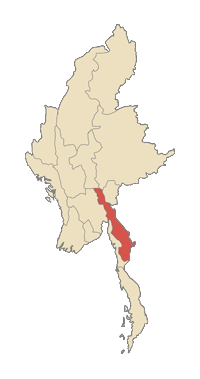
Karen state in Myanmar

The S'gaw, (S'gaw Karen: စှီၤ or ပှၤကညီဖိ, also spelled Skaw, S'gau), who refer to themselves as Paganyaw, Pga K'nyau, or K'nyaw (also spelled Pgaz Cgauz and Pakayo,), are an ethnic group of Burma and Thailand. They speak the S'gaw Karen language.

The S'gaw are a subgroup of the Karen people. They are also referred to by the exonym White Karen, a term dating from colonial times and used in contrast to the Karenni (or "Red Karen") and the Pa'O (or "Black Karen"), even though the latter often rejected the term "Karen" to refer to themselves.

The S'gaw live primarily in eastern Burma (Karen State, Mon state, Karenni state). Many of them migrate to the Thai-Burmese border and live there as refugees due to conflict in the Karen state. S'gaw people are the founder of the Karen National Union (KNU).

== Origins ==
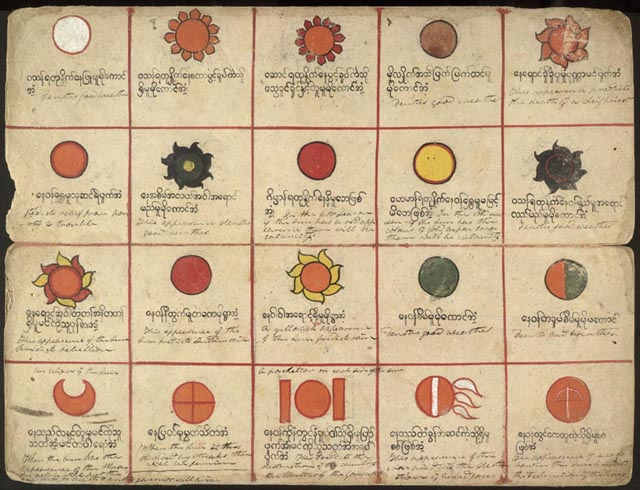
Manuscript of the mid-nineteenth century, possibly of Sgaw Karen origin.

Karen (S'gaw and Pwo) legend refer to a 'river of running sand' (S'gaw Karen: ထံဆဲမဲးယွါ) which they believe Pu Taw Meh Pa led the Karen people across the river of the running sand. Many Karen think this refers to the Gobi Desert, although they have lived in Burma for centuries. The legend made the Karen people believe that they are from Mongolia.

== See also ==
- Karen Baptist Convention
- Karen Baptist Theological Seminary
- Karen of the Andamans
