= Karen Human Rights Group =

Human rights organization

- Founded: 1992
- Type: Human Rights Advocacy
- Region served: Burma
- Website: www.khrg.org

The Karen Human Rights Group (KHRG) is a grassroots Karen-led human rights organisation, established in Karen State during 1992 and it is now operating across rural southeast Burma/Myanmar. With over twenty years of experience. KHRG is recognised internationally as an authority on major issues such as internal displacement, forced labour, landmines, conflict and land confiscation in southeast Burma/Myanmar. KHRG works directly with "rural villagers who are suffering abuses such as forced labor, systematic destruction of villagers and crops, forced relocations, extortion, looting, arbitrary detention, torture, sexual assault and summary executions." Most of these abuses were committed by soldiers and officials of the State Peace & Development Council (SPDC), Burma's previous ruling military junta. The organisation's goal is to support villagers in rural Burma, by helping them develop strategies to resist abuse and by translating their testimonies for worldwide distribution, accompanied by supporting photos and documentary evidence.

Most recently, KHRG was awarded the Asia Democracy and Human Rights Award in 2013, and KHRG staffers have been chosen to represent national civil society organisations in discussing land rights with the Myanmar National Human Rights Commission and the Myanmar Peace Center, and to testify before the United Nations Security Council about child soldiers.

== History ==
=== Karen people ===
The Karen are a group of Indo-Chinese tribes living principally in Burma in the Indo-Chinese Peninsula. The greater part of this territory they occupy in connection with the other peoples of the country, namely, the Burmese, Shan, Siamese, and Chin. The only exclusively Karen country is the hilly region of the Toungoo district and the Karenni subdivision.

The Karen languages, members of the Tibeto-Burman group of the Sino-Tibetan language family, consist of three mutually unintelligible branches: Sgaw, Pwo, and Pa'o.[20] [21] Karenni (Red Karen) and Kayan belong to the Sgaw branch. Karens were Animists originally, but today the majority is Buddhist in conjunction with Animism. The Buddhist influence came from the Mon who were dominant in Lower Burma until the middle of the 18th century. Tha Byu, the first convert to Christianity in 1828. Persecution of Christians by the Burmese authorities has continued to this day, fuelled by the belief that Western imperialists have sought to divide the country not only on ethnic but on religious grounds.

=== Background on Burma ===
Burma is a country of ethnic diversity, its estimated population of 48–50 million being divided between 15 major ethnic groups, many of them with distinct subgroups. These groups come from very different origins. The extent of differences is visible in their cultures and languages. According to the Karen, their people "arrived in Burma, a region at the time was virtually unpopulated jungle, approximately 2,500 years ago after a migration in several stages from the region of what is now Mongolia, and settled in what is now the Irrawaddy and Sittaung basin of central Burma." This began the movement of peoples like the Karen from the central lowlands out into the hills. The British took over what is now Burma in 3 wars: 1824–26, 1852–53, and finally in 1886, when ‘Burma’ became part of the British Empire as a province of British India. Burma gained its independence in 1948. "The military has dominated government since General Ne Win led a coup in 1962 that toppled the civilian government of U Nu. Burma remains under the tight control of the military-led State Peace and Development Council."

=== Karen’s issues with the Burmese government ===
Burma is home to one of the longest running civil wars in the world. Over the last 50 years, opposition organisations representing a variety of political agendas have taken up arms against the central government in Rangoon. Since 1962, the country has been run by a succession of military governments, including the current ruling junta, the SPDC. The primary victims in Burma's protracted civil war have been ethnic minority people, like the Karen, Mon and Karenni.

Under the rule of the SPDC, farming villages have to deal with several Army battalions moving into the area, restricting the movements of villagers and demanding food, labour, and building materials. Karen families operate on a subsistence level, growing enough rice and vegetables for their own use. Their system has no safety net in hard times, therefore there is no built-in capacity to deal with this situation. Their forced relocation under the SPDC military is for the purpose of using them as a convenient source of unpaid labour at local Army camps and along the roads. After a few months, many people find they have little option but to starve or flee. The Burmese army carries out massive forced relocation of rural villages, with the intention of eliminating civilian support for opposition groups or clearing ground for infrastructural projects. These days most people know what is happening at the relocation sites, so when they are ordered to move they simply flee into hiding in the forests surrounding their farmlands. Tens of thousands of people are presently living in this way "under the constant risk of being captured or shot by passing SPDC patrols who also seek out and destroy their food supplies and crops in the fields. Eventually, they can no longer survive this way and try to make their way to the border [between Burma and] Thailand to become refugees."

== KHRG’s Vision and Mission ==
The Karen Human Rights Group envisions a future in which people in Burma achieve full human rights and justice. To this end, the KHRG seeks to further develop as an independent, credible and Karen-led organisation working in close co-operation with local communities and operating with a perspective on human rights as articulated by villagers themselves.

KHRG is an independent local organisation committed to improving the human rights situation in Burma by projecting the voices of villagers and supporting their strategies to claim human rights. KHRG aims to increase villagers’ capability and opportunity to claim their human rights, and ensure that their voices, priorities and perspectives influence decision makers. They encourage other local and international groups and institutions to support villagers’ self-protection strategies.

== Karen camps and locations ==
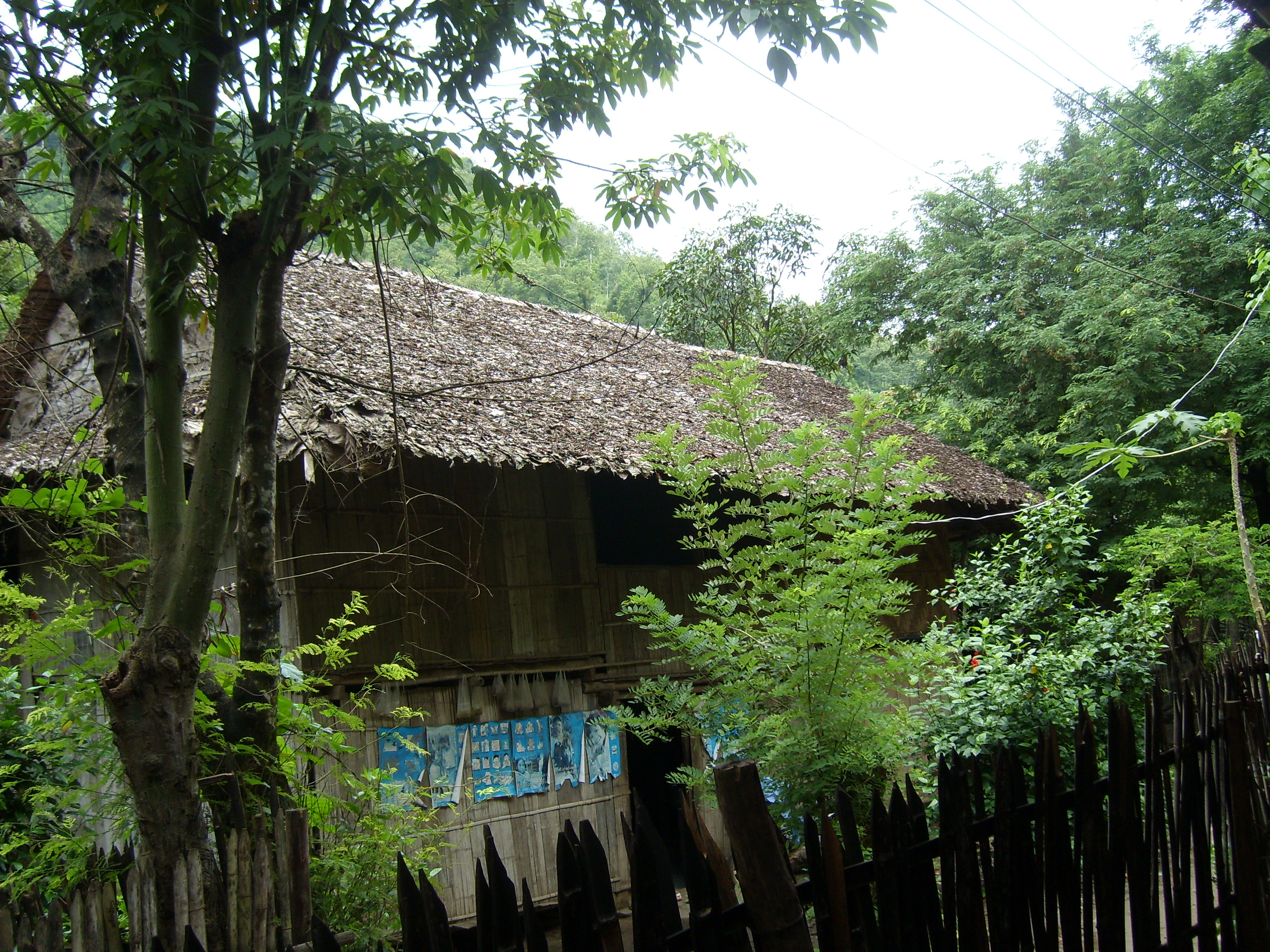
Mae Sot, Thai–Burmese border. Many Karen refugee camps are located along this border.

The first Karen camp was established in 1984, not far from the border town of Mae Sot in Thailand's Tak Province. By 1986, there were 12 Karen refugee camps with a collective population of 19,000 people in Tak and Mae Hong Son provinces.

The border between Thailand and Burma is over 2,000 km long, with thousands of potential crossing points. The link attached illustrates the Karen districts and the locations of various refugee camps along the border of the two states. New camps have often been established close to wherever large groups of new refugees crossed, frequently in the wake of military offensives. Individual families and smaller groups arriving in Thailand separately have gone to established camps. While some camps are located on main roads and near Thai villages, many are in remote areas. The terrain along the border is mountainous and heavily forested in places.

== Documentaries on the Karen people ==
Human Rights in Burma is a documentary created by Burma Issues Organization. Another documentary, Prayer of Peace: Relief and Resistance in Burma’s War Zones, is a short documentary created by Free Burma Rangers (FBR), a multi-ethnic humanitarian service movement that brings help, hope and love to people in the war zones of Burma.

A short extract from the film:

People know me as Monkey. In the Free Burma Rangers, I am a team pastor. And another role is video cameraman. I started this work in 1998. At that time the Burma Army came and the villagers fled into the jungle. As they fled I took photos with a still camera. When people looked at the photos I would explain to them. I wanted the photos to open their hearts. I tried but the photos were not enough. I though if had a video camera it would be better. Instead of me speaking for them they speak for themselves and people would be moved. So I wanted to do video.

In 2015, KHRG published a documentary on land confiscation in rural southeast Burma/Myanmar entitled 'With only our voices, what can we do?'

== KHRG's position and roles within global perspectives ==
Scholar Kevin Malseed in Where There Is No Movement: Local Resistance and the Potential for Solidarity argues that even though "in Burma, any attempt to form independent agrarian movements is violently suppressed, rural Karen villagers have developed and practice complex forms of resistance involving inter-community action and solidarity across wide regions." These movements have been successful in "weakening state control over land and livelihoods largely because their lack of formal organization makes them difficult to target".

Ingrid Brees in Refugees and transnationalism on the Thai–Burmese border examines the role of the KHRG on the Burmese-Thai border. She argues that even though "the past decade has seen the rapid development of transnationalism research, transnationalism from below in situations of mass refugee influx has received little attention. However, the case study of Burmese refugees in Thailand clearly demonstrates that those refugees can maintain economic, social, cultural and political links with co-nationals in all the domains of the refugee diaspora, even if their capabilities are in principle strained." It is believed that these organisations play a fundamental role in aiding refugees and helping them sustain their socio-political legitimacy.

== See also ==
- Human rights

== Bibliography ==
- Prayer of Peace: Relief & Resistance in Burma's War Zones. Dir. Blauer, Matt, Front Films (Firm), and Choices Video (Firm). Choices Video, 2008.
- Bleming, Thomas James (2007). War in Karen Country: Armed Struggle for a Free and Independent Karen State in Southeast Asia. iUniverse, Incorporated.
- Brees, I. (2010). Refugees and Transnationalism on the Thai–Burmese Border. Global Networks, 10: 282–299. doi:10.1111/j.1471-0374.2010.00286.x
- Human Rights in Burma: A Compilation of Recent Videos. Dir. Burma Issues (Organization), and Inc. Witness Films. Witness; [Bangkok] : Burma Issues, 2007.
- Fong, Jack (2008). Revolution as Development: The Karen Self-Determination Struggle Against Ethnocracy (1949-2004). Universal Publishers. ISBN 1-59942-994-2.
- The Karen Human Rights Group (2000). Suffering in Silence: The Human Rights Nightmare of the Karen People of Burma. Universal Publishers. ISBN 1-58112-704-9.
- Malseed, K. (2008). Where There Is No Movement: Local resistance and the potential for solidarity. Journal of Agrarian Change, 8: 489–514. doi:10.1111/j.1471-0366.2008.00178.x
- Marshall, Harry Ignatius (1922). The Karen People of Burma: A study in anthropology and ethnology. The University.
- Pedersen, Morten B. (2008) Promoting Human Rights in Burma: A critique of western sanctions policy. Rowman & Littlefield Publishers, Inc. ISBN 0-7425-5559-3.
- Rogers, Benedict (2004). A Land Without Evil. Monarch Books.
