= Karen Americans =

Americans of full or partial Karen (ethnic group indigenous to Myanmar) descent

ကညီအမဲရကၤဖိ
- Karen flag

Total population
- 215,000 (2024, est.)

Regions with significant populations
- Minnesota (Minneapolis–Saint Paul); Indiana (Indianapolis, Fort Wayne); New York (Albany, Buffalo, Rochester, Syracuse, Utica), California (San Francisco Bay Area), Nebraska, (Omaha, Lincoln), Texas (Austin, Houston, Dallas, Amarillo); North Carolina (Chapel Hill, New Bern), Utah (Salt Lake City)

Languages
- Karen languages (S'gaw Karen, Karenni, Pa'O), English

Religion
- Predominantly Christianity (especially Baptist and Seventh-day Adventist; other denominations include Reformed Christian, Catholicism, Anglicanism, and Mormonism); minorities of Buddhism and Animism

Karen Americans (S'gaw Karen: ကညီအမဲရကၤဖိ) are Americans of full or partial Karen ancestry. They are a recent but rapidly growing immigrant population in the United States. Many Karen who emigrate are refugees as a result of violence in their homeland. Many come either from their traditional homeland of Kawthoolei in Myanmar or from refugee camps in Thailand.

Minnesota had more than 20,000 Karen residents in 2025, making it the state with the largest Karen community. Other states with significant populations are California, Texas, New York, and Indiana.

Karen first started arriving in the United States en masse during the mid-2000s and now form a significant minority in several cities. The growth of Karen Americans is part of the larger growth of Burmese Americans in the United States.

The Karenni, a related subgroup of the Karen, are sometimes included in official statistics of Karen Americans and other times are treated as a separate ethnicity.

== History ==
The first Karen refugees started arriving in the United States in the late 1990s, but only during the mid-2000s did Karen people start emigrating en masse. Resettlement of Burmese refugees peaked in October 2006 to August 2007, when 12,800 Karen refugees were resettled in the United States.

In November 2017, over 9,000 Karen people gathered in Washington, D.C., to both thank the United States government for granting them settlement and at the same time protest the Burmese government's treatment of the Karen and other minorities, especially the ongoing persecution of Rohingya people and the Trump-era policies on immigration. Karen people have protested in the past in Washington, D.C., over the treatment of Karen by the Myanmar government.

== Distribution ==
Karenni teenagers at Panama City Beach, Florida

As of June 2022 there were 75,218 Karen refugees that had been resettled in the United States, with an additional 13,509 of the Karenni ethnicity. These numbers may be inaccurate as the statistics cover only Karen who came after 2000 and counted as refugees.

=== Minnesota ===
The state with the largest Karen population, most Karen who live in Minnesota reside in the Twin Cities area. As of 2025, there are over 20,000 Karen people living in Minnesota. Among Minnesota public K-12 students, Karen is the fifth most commonly spoken home language: it's spoken by 4,700 students, more than half of whom live in St. Paul.

Within Minnesota, the majority of Karen people live in Ramsey County. There are also Karen communities in Greater Minnesota, including Albert Lea, Austin, Marshall, and Willmar.

==== Cultural impact in Minnesota ====
The majority of Saint Paul's Baptist congregations' members are now Karen. The Karen Organization of Minnesota (KOM) was founded to improve the community's social progress, health, and employment opportunities and is today the largest Karen social organization in the country.

Ler Htoo was sworn in after graduating from the St. Paul Police Academy in Minnesota in 2014. Htoo is believed to be the first ever police officer of Karen ethnicity in the United States.

The Saint Paul Public Library has commissioned and published two children's books in Karen because of the lack of these resources in the U.S. and the need within the city. The city of Saint Paul has the largest and fastest-growing population of Karen people in the U.S.

Karen language classes are offered at multiple public schools in Minnesota, including four high schools in Saint Paul as of 2023 Karen language classes bear increased significance since the language was banned for 60 years in Myanmar. The classes at Saint Paul schools are believed to be the first Karen language classes at any public school in the US. Building on the popularity of the high school classes, Saint Paul started offering Karen language kindergarten classes at Wellstone Elementary School in 2024.

Some Minnesota state resources are available in Karen, including hunting and fishing regulations and drivers' license exams.

In 2022, Xia Gallery and Cafe in Saint Paul hosted a group exhibit titled “Window to the Soul: A Myanmar Group Exhibit” featuring Karen artists.

=== New York ===
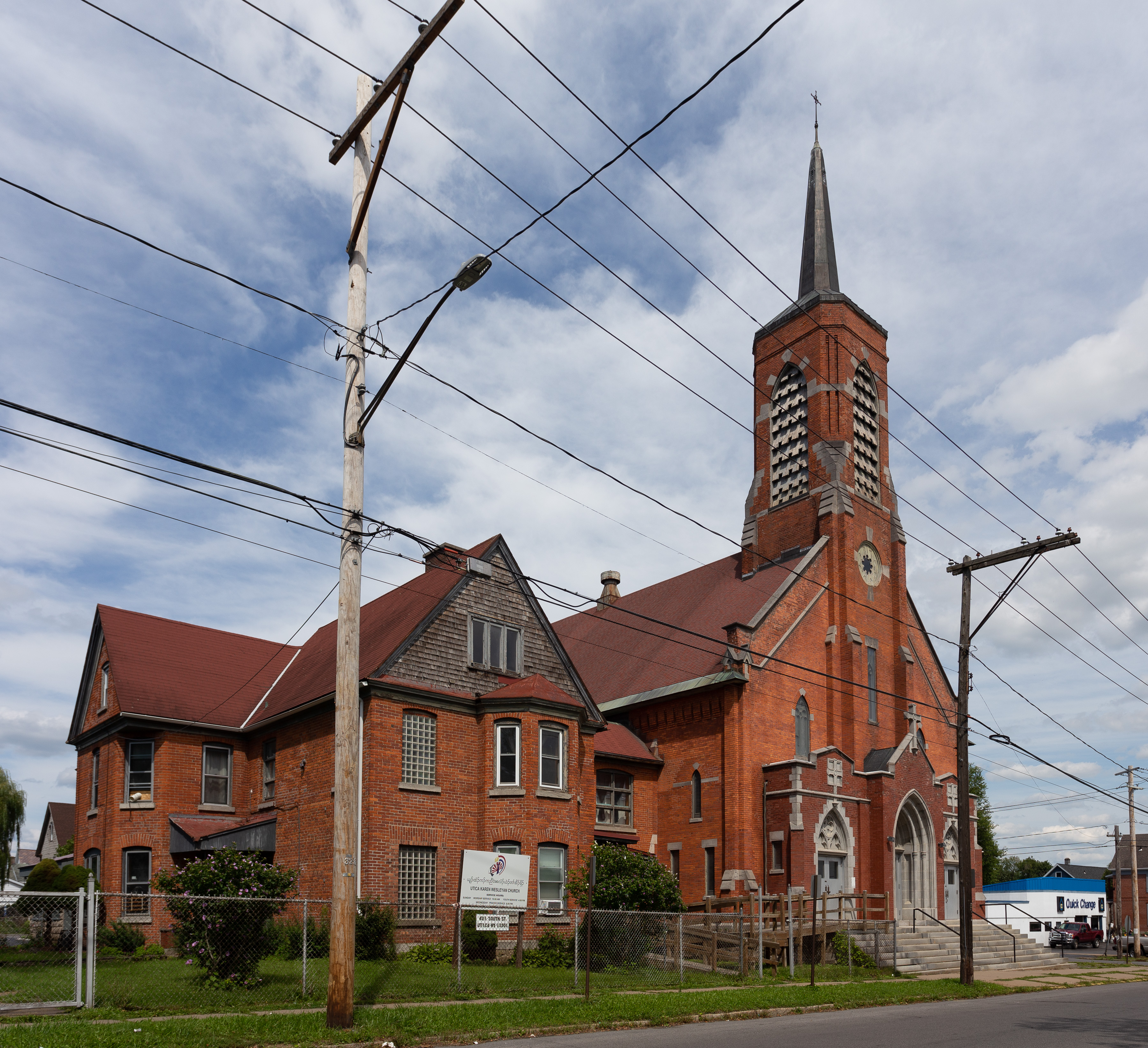
Utica Karen Wesleyan Church in Utica, New York

Many of the major metropolitan areas of upstate New York have significant Karen populations. Estimates in 2010 put their numbers at 2,500 in Buffalo, 500 in Rochester, 4,000 in Utica and Rome and 1,000 in Albany. However, more recent accounts put the number much higher. In 2015 around 5,000 ware believed to reside in Albany, while as of 2016 5,500 Karen and 1,200 Karenni were believed to live in Buffalo. From 2006 to 2017 a total of around 2,400 Karen refugees settled in Syracuse. A 2024 report said that more than 8,000 Karen lived in Utica.

New York recognizes August as Karen American Heritage Month.

=== Nebraska ===
Karen refugees first started arriving in the Omaha area around 2005, and as of 2013 an estimated 5,000 had settled in the area. Nebraska was believed to be the state with the third-highest Karen population after Minnesota and New York.

=== Indiana ===
The city of Indianapolis has a significant population of Burmese immigrants which include the roughly 1,000 Karen and 300 Karenni refugees who have been resettled there. Karen are a part of over 10,000 Burmese refugees that have been resettled in Indiana, including Chin and Rohingya.

=== Other states ===
Other areas with sizable Karen populations include southern portions of Salt Lake City, the San Francisco Bay Area, and several cities in Texas. An approximate 3,500 Karen are believed to be living in Atlanta, Georgia, and Chapel Hill, North Carolina. The town of New Bern, North Carolina is believed to have around 1,900 Karen and Karenni refugees who came because of the abundance of work and low cost of living in the 1990s. Karen are one of the groups of Burmese refugees that have now been settled in Phoenix, Arizona, along with Chin and Burmese Muslim refugees. Burmese refugees are the largest group being resettled in Iowa since 2008, with the majority being Karen. Many Karen refugees have been settled in Des Moines, Iowa in particular by Adventist charity organizations, as well as in Nashville, Tennessee, and Saint Louis and Kansas City in Missouri. A community of around 700 Karen refugees have settled in Clarksville, Arkansas, since 2005. In 2006, many Karen refugees relocated to Huron, South Dakota to work for a turkey plant. Since then, they contributed greatly to reverse the population decline in the city, where the Asian population reached almost 15% in the 2020 census.

== Religion ==
=== Christianity ===
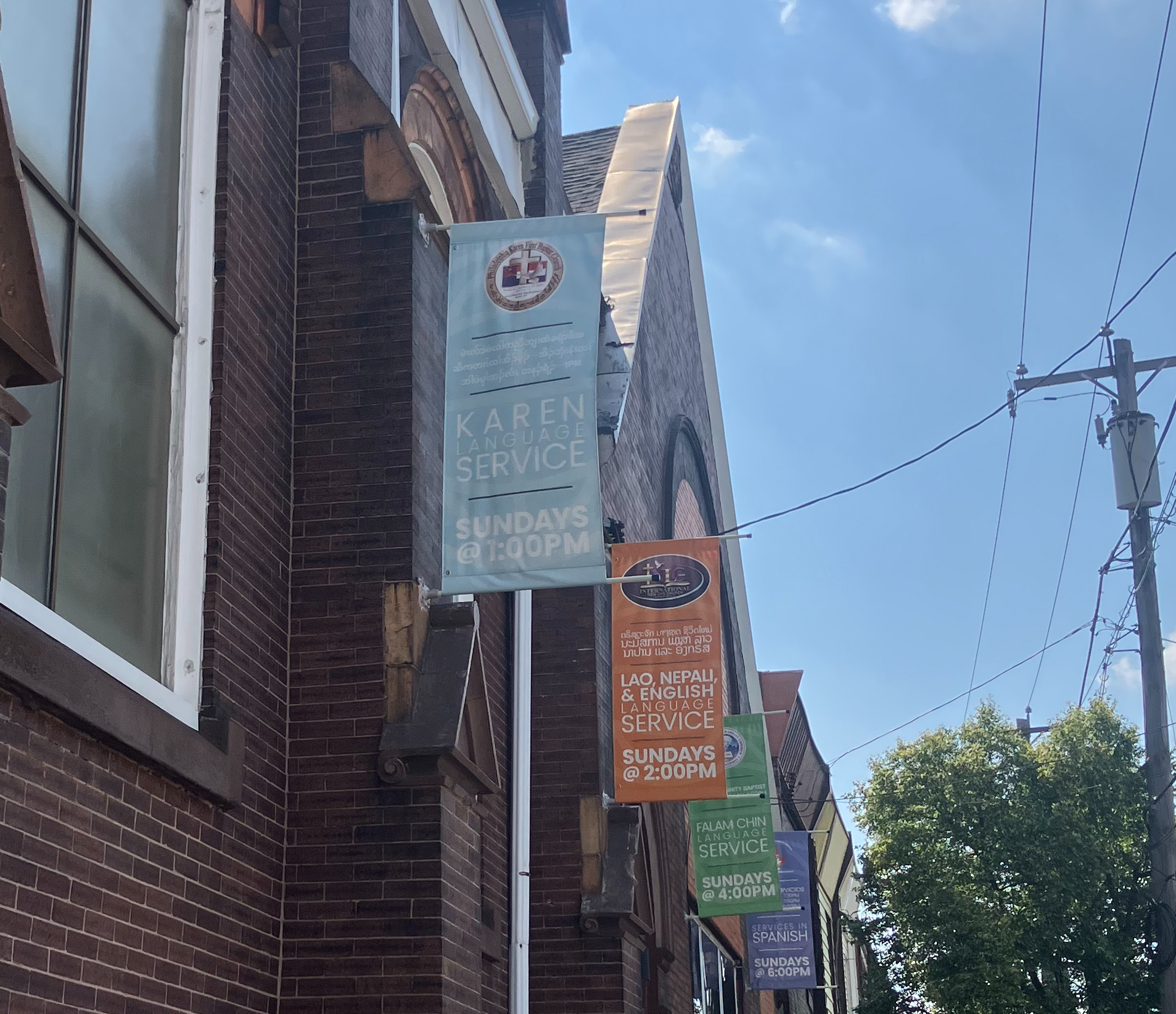
A Christian church in Whitman, South Philadelphia offering services in a variety of languages including Karen.

Although only around 15–20% of Karen people in Myanmar are Christians, the vast majority of Karen refugees tend to practice Christianity, specifically the Baptist and Seventh-day-Adventist denominations. Many Baptist churches and other religious denominations have separate services for their local Karen population. Besides Baptist and Seventh-day-Adventist communities, there exists a Catholic Karenni community numbering around 4,500 in places such as Minnesota, and Arizona. Since the 2010s the Archdiocese of Saint Paul and Minneapolis has included prayers and hymns in the Karen language in their religious services. Most Karen tend to be Baptist while the Karenni tend to be of Catholic and other Christian denominations. In southern Salt Lake City, the Columbus LDS meetinghouse is now geared towards Karen and Karenni refugees who now make up the majority of the congregation. Anglicanism and Reformed Christian are also present in significant numbers. In 2013 the Karen community of Omaha planned to build the Karen Christian Revival Church costing an estimate 2 million for their worship needs. Karen Christians usually congregate in rented space or borrow other churches' properties. In 2017, the Karen community of Syracuse bought a Polish-American bar and converted it into the Syracuse Karen Baptist church.

Christianity tends to play an important part in many Karen Americans' lives, and church attendance is generally high. Churches tend to be the focal point of the Karen community, where many activities and organizations are based, so much so that many Buddhist and other non-Christian Karen sometimes attend church for the sake of participating in community events with their Christian counterparts.

=== Buddhism ===
While Buddhists make up a majority of the overall Karen population, they are a minority within the Karen American population. The first Karen Buddhist temple with four monks was opened in 2013 in Minnesota. Karen Buddhist associations exist in Minnesota, Colorado, Iowa, and Utica, New York.

Because most aid directed to Karen refugees is primarily through Christian organizations, Karen Buddhists have complained of pressure to convert to Christianity by Karen Christians, to the extent that some Karen Buddhists would rather live separate from their Christian counterparts. Nonetheless, relationships between Karen Buddhists and Christians are generally good. Most Christian and Buddhist Karen still traditionally celebrate Karen New Year together.

=== Other religions ===
Many Karen, especially Buddhist Karen, incorporate Animist traditions and beliefs in their spirituality. The wrist-tying ceremony which is practiced by both Christian and Buddhist Karen has its origins in Karen Animism.

In the Karen traditional heartland there exists a small community of Karen Muslims who are the descendants of Indian and Bengali Muslims who intermarried with Karen people. These people are called "Knyaw Too" or "Black Karen" and have been subject to persecution by Buddhists in Myanmar. Some Knyaw Too have also emigrated to the United States but they often identify as Burmese Muslims and are not counted in the Karen statistics.

In the late 2000s a Hmong American named Vaj Los Tuam (who later changed his name to "Txiv Nraug Cuam Dub" or Hmong for "Black Father") founded the "Huv" or "pure" religion based on traditional Karen beliefs, whom he perceived to be the most original of all Southeast Asian animist traditions. Followers of "Huv" must follow a vegetarian diet and dress in what they perceive to be traditional Karen cloths. While the "Huv" religious movement has around a thousand Hmong American followers there is no indication that it has any large following among Karen Americans.

== Health and social issues ==
Poster released in the Karen language by the Centers for Disease Control and Prevention to help slow the spread against COVID-19

Owing to the ongoing conflict and warfare in their homeland as well as the harsh conditions of the refugee camps in Thailand where many come from, a sizable percentage of Karen adults in the United States may have PTSD. Perhaps one of the biggest issues facing the Karen American community is the lack of fluency and literacy in English. A 2013 study found that Karen students were far more likely to miss classes or quit school or sports teams because of a lack of fluency. In many cases, bullying and feelings of isolation were effects of an inability by Karen youth to speak English. Being unable to speak English was also correlated with unemployment and a lower standard of living.

The issues of English fluency and lack of understanding the justice system were brought to light in 2015 when a mentally disturbed Karen man Eh Lar Doh Htoo attacked a Karenni-speaking family in their home in New Bern, North Carolina, with a machete. Three children (aged 1, 5, and 12) were hacked to death and the mother had to escape by jumping out of the second floor window. Police response to the attack was severely delayed because neither the victims or her neighbors were fluent in English. The case also drew attention because neighbors of Htoo had been aware of his violent nature for some time but had not contacted the police because of language and cultural barriers.

Around 80% of Karen adults either smoke tobacco and/or chew betel nut, both of which are considered serious health hazards. Because many priests, elders, and other respected community members smoke or chew betel nut, it is difficult to convince Karen youth not to take up the habit. Karen children are more likely to be exposed to secondhand smoke than non-Karen children. In Minnesota, Karen organizations have started partnering with health anti-smoking groups in hope of improving the problem.

Gang membership and violence is a recent but serious problem facing the Karen communities. Unlike many other refugees Karen usually come exclusively from rural areas and often have trouble adapting to urban life. A survey in 2015 found that Karen youth were more likely to becoming involved in gang activities than any other refugee group.

In response to the difficulties Karen and other refugee communities face, some cities have opened up special schools exclusively for refugees.

In June 2024, a fatal police police shooting of 13-year-old Karen refugee named Nyah Mway In Utica, New York generated significant controversy, and was the first time that a Karen person in the United States was killed by a police officer.

== Sports ==
Soccer is popular among the Karen people, with some youths being recruited to play in college. Many Karen, however, feel alienated when playing for a school's sports team and so generally tend to play the sport among themselves, organizing teams and tournaments. These youths, however, are not able to pay for transportation and related costs of playing on a club team. To combat these issues, some schools and non-profit organizations started soccer programs primarily geared towards Karen and other refugee communities.

Besides soccer, both volleyball and sepak takraw are also popular sports. In 2017, Bishop Maginn High School in Albany, New York, formed a mostly Karen baseball team.

== Notable people ==
See List of Karen.
