= Andaman Karen Musley rice =

Type of non-Basmati aromatic rice from Andaman and Nicobar Islands, India

- Geographical indication
- Description: Andaman Karen Musley rice is an aromatic rice cultivated in Andaman and Nicobar Islands
- Type: Aromatic rice
- Area: Mayabunder and Diglipur tehsil of North and Middle Andaman district
- Country: India
- Registered: 3 December 2024
- Official website: ipindia.gov.in

Andaman Karen Musley rice is a variety of non-Basmati, short-grained aromatic rice mainly grown in the Indian Union territory of Andaman and Nicobar Islands by the Karen community. It is a common and widely cultivated crop in the Mayabunder tehsil of the North and Middle Andaman district, particularly in villages like Webi, Deopur, Lataw, Lucknow (Burmabera), Karmatang-9 and Karmatang-10 along with Borang, and Chipo villages of Diglipur tehsil.

Under its Geographical Indication tag, it is referred to as "Andaman Karen Musley rice".

== Name ==
The name "Andaman Karen Musley" holds a threefold significance, referring to the geographical region of the Andaman islands where it's cultivated, acknowledging the local Karen community that has traditionally cultivated this paddy for generations, and named after one of the five ancient rice cultures, Musley, cultivated in the region.

== Description ==
Musley rice, a native rice variety, is renowned for its distinct aroma, nutritional richness, and adaptability to saline soils, with the Karen community preserving their cultural heritage through its traditional cultivation. Musley Rice is used for both lunch and dinner. It has a high yield, small grains, and good taste.

== Geographical indication ==
It was awarded the Geographical Indication (GI) status tag from the Geographical Indications Registry, under the Union Government of India, on 3 December 2024.

Centre for Participatory Training and Learning from Port Blair, proposed the GI registration of Andaman Karen Musley rice. After filing the application in February 2023, the rice was granted the GI tag in 2024 by the Geographical Indication Registry in Chennai, making the name "Andaman Karen Musley rice" exclusive to the rice grown in the region. It thus became the first rice variety from Andaman and Nicobar Islands and the 6th type of goods from Andaman and Nicobar Islands to earn the GI tag.

The prestigious GI tag, awarded by the GI registry, celebrates the heritage of the Karen communities, and provide intellectual property protection, ensuring the preservation of these products for future generations.

== See also ==
- Marcha rice
