= Karen Baptist Missionary Society =

The Karen Baptist Missionary Society was an organization of Karen (people) in Burma who were baptists. It was formed in 1912 with the main goal of spreading the baptist religion to more of the Karen people.

== Sources ==
- Encyclopedia of Christian History, 1982 Edition.
