= Hemidactylus karenorum =

Conservation status
- Least Concern (IUCN 3.1)

Scientific classification
- Kingdom: Animalia
- Phylum: Chordata
- Class: Reptilia
- Order: Squamata
- Suborder: Gekkota
- Family: Gekkonidae
- Genus: Hemidactylus
- Species: H. karenorum

Binomial name
- Hemidactylus karenorum (Theobald, 1868)

Synonyms
- Doryura karenorum Theobald, 1868; Hemidactylus karenorum — Boulenger, 1885

Species of lizard

Hemidactylus karenorum, commonly known as the Burmese leaf gecko, the Burmese leaf-toed gecko, and the Burmese spotted gecko, is a species of gecko, a lizard in the family Gekkonidae. The species is endemic to Southeast Asia.

== Etymology ==
The specific name, karenorum, is in honor of the Karen people, a hill tribe in Myanmar.

== Description ==
H. karenorum has the following characteristics: Snout longer than the distance between the eye and the ear-opening, one and one third or one and two fifths the diameter of the orbit; forehead slightly concave; ear-opening small, roundish. Head granular, the granules enlarged on the snout. Rostral 4-sided, not quite twice so broad as high, with median cleft above; nostril bordered by the rostral, the first labial and three nasals. 11 or 12 upper and seven to 9 lower labials; mental large, triangular; two pair of chin-shields, median pair in contact. Body covered with minute granules and numerous small convex round tubercles; a slight lateral fold and another bordering the thighs posteriorly. Ventral scales cycloid, imbricate. Male with six pre-anal pores in an angular series. The female has six enlarged scales in the pre-anal region. Tail depressed, flat below, with sharp denticulated lateral edge, covered above with equal small scales, below with a median series of large transversely dilated plates. Limbs moderate; digits free, dilated, inner well developed; infradigital lamellae curved, five under the thumb, nine under the fourth finger, 5 or 6 under the first toe, 10 or 12 under the fourth toe. Light grey-brown above, variegated with darker brown. Lower parts whitish. Length of head and body 50 mm.; tail 56 mm.

== Geographic range ==
H. karenorum is found in Myanmar (formerly known as Burma).

The type locality given by Theobald is "Karen-choung, prope Tonghu" (= Karen-choung, near Taungoo, Myanmar).

== Habitat ==
The preferred natural habitat of H. karenorum is forest, at altitudes of 30–800 m (98–2,625 ft), but it has also been found in urban areas on buildings.

== Reproduction ==
H. karenorum is oviparous.
