= Eastern Pwo language =

Karenic language spoken in Myanmar, Thailand

Eastern Pwo
- ဖၠုံ, ဖၠုံယှိုဝ်, ဖၠုံဘာႋသာ့ဆ်ုခၠါင်, ဖၠုံဆ်ုခၠါင်
- Native to: Myanmar, Thailand
- Ethnicity: Pwo Karen people
- Native speakers: (1,050,000 cited 1998)
- Language family: Sino-Tibetan: Tibeto-Burman; Karenic; Pwo; Eastern Pwo
- Writing system: Mon-Burmese script (various alphabets); Leke script, Thai script

Language codes
- ISO 639-3: kjp
- Glottolog: pwoe1235

Eastern Pwo or Phlou (Pwo Eastern Karen: ဖၠုံ, ဖၠုံယှိုဝ်, ဖၠုံဘာႋသာ့ဆ်ုခၠါင်, ဖၠုံဆ်ုခၠါင်, Burmese: အရှေ့ပိုးကရင်) is a Karen language spoken by Eastern Pwo people and over a million people in Myanmar and by about 50,000 in Thailand, where it has been called Southern Pwo. It is not intelligible with other varieties of Pwo, with which it shares 63 to 65% lexical similarity. The Eastern Pwo dialects share 91 to 97% lexical similarity.

A script called Leke was developed between 1830 and 1860 and is used by members of the millenarian Leke sect of Buddhism. Otherwise, a variety of Mon-Burmese alphabets are used, and refugees in Thailand have created a Thai alphabet that is in limited use.

== Distribution ==
- Kayin State and Tanintharyi Region: long contiguous area near the Thai border
- Bago Region: Bago and Toungoo townships

== Phonology ==
The following displays the phonological features of two of the eastern Pwo Karen dialects, Pa'an and Tavoy:

=== Consonants ===
		Labial	Dental	Alveolar	(Alveolo-) Palatal	Velar	Uvular/ Glottal
Nasal		m		n	ɲ		
Plosive/ Affricate	voiceless	p	t̪	t	tɕ	k	ʔ
Plosive/ Affricate	aspirated	pʰ		tʰ	tɕʰ	kʰ	
Plosive/ Affricate	voiced	b		d			
Plosive/ Affricate	implosive	(ɓ)		(ɗ)			
Fricative	voiceless				ɕ	x	h
Fricative	voiced					ɣ	ʁ
Sonorant	median	w		r	j		
Sonorant	lateral			l			

- Post-alveolar affricates /tɕ, tɕʰ/, are realized as fricatives [s, sʰ], among some formal dialects.
- /t̪/ when pronounced slowly is phonetically realized as a dental affricate [t̪θ].
- Voiced plosives /b, d/ are pronounced as implosives [ɓ, ɗ] only in the Pa'an dialect.
- /h/ does not exist in the Tavoy dialect.
- /j/ may tend to be slightly fricativized [ʝ] when preceding front vowels.
- /r/ may also be realized as a tap [ɾ].

=== Vowels ===
	Front	Central	Back	
High	i	ɨ	ɯ	u
Near-high	ɪ		ʊ	
High-mid	e		ɤ	o
Low-mid	ɛ		ɔ	
Low		a		

- /ɪ/ does not occur after a /w/ sound.
- /ɪ, ʊ, ɛ, ɔ/ are merged with /i, u, e, o/ in the Tavoy dialect.

=== Tones ===
Four tones are present in Eastern Pwo:

Tones
v́	˦
v̄	˧
v̀	˨
v̂	˥˩

== Dialects ==
- Pa’an (Inland Eastern Pwo Karen, Moulmein)
- Kawkareik (Eastern Border Pwo Karen)
- Tavoy (Southern Pwo Karen)

== Alphabet ==
The alphabet used for Eastern Pwo Karen language is in Mon-Burmese script.

=== Letters ===
The Eastern Pwo alphabet contains 36 letters, including 3 unique to the language (in gold), and one shared with Mon.

က k	ခ kh	ဂ g	ဃ gh	င nga
စ ca	ဆ cha	ဇ ja	ဈ jha	ည nnya
ဋ ṭa	ဌ ṭha	ဍ ḍa	ဎ ḍha	ၮ ṇa
တ t	ထ th	ဒ da	ဓ dha	န na
ပ pa	ဖ pha	ဗ ba	ဘ bha	မ ma
ယ ya	ရ ra	လ la	ဝ va	သ sa
	ဟ ha	ဠ la	အ a	
	ၜ ḅa	ၯ ywa	ၰ ghwa	

=== Numerals ===
Number	Numeral	Name
0	၀ ploh plih	ပၠဝ်ပၠေ/သြုံ့
1	၁ luh	လ်ု လုဟ်
2	၂ née	ၮီ့
3	၃ thuh	သိုင့်
4	၄ lee	လီႋ
5	၅ yeh	ယာဲ
6	၆ hu	ၰူ့
7	၇ nwey	နိုဲ့
8	၈ xoh	ၰိုတ်
9	၉ khwee	ခုဲ့
10	၁၀ luh chi/chi	လ်ုဆီ့(ဆီ့)
11	၁၁ chi luh	ဆီ့လ်ု
12	၁၂ chi ne	ဆီ့ၮီ့
20	၂၀ ne chi	ၮီ့ဆီ့
21	၂၁ ne chi luh	ၮီ့ဆီ့လ်ု
22	၂၂ ne chi ne	ၮီ့ဆီ့ၮီ့
100	၁၀၀ luh pong/pong	လ်ုဖင်ႋ(ဖင်ႋ)
101	၁၀၁ luh pong luh	လ်ုဖင်ႋလ်ု
1 000	၁ ၀၀၀ luh muh/muh	လ်ုမိုင့်(မိုင့်)
10 000	၁ ၀၀၀၀ luh lah/lah	လ်ုလာ(လာ)
100 000	၁၀၀ ၀၀၀ luh thay/thay	လ်ုလုဂ်(လုဂ်)/လ်ုသိင်ႋ(သိင်ႋ)

The Eastern Pwo Karen numerals were encoded in the Myanmar Extended C Unicode block in Unicode v16.0 in 2024.

- The number zero, ploh plih (ပၠဝ်ပၠေ), means "of no value".
- The number zero is not used in day-to-day life and mostly exists in writing only. People are taught to use the Burmese numeric system instead, including zero.
- Chi (ဆီ့) denotes 10, any number from 1 to 9 before chi can be interpreted as "of ten(s)", so 20 would be ne chi. Pong (ဖင်ႋ) denotes 100, any number from 1 to 9 before pong can be interpreted as "hundred(s)", so 200 would be ne pong. Similarly, the same rule applies to thousand, muh (မိုင့်); ten-thousand, lah (လာ); and hundred-thousand, loud/thein (လုဂ်/သိင်ႋ).
- Numbers after the hundred-thousands (millions and above) are prefixed with thay (သိင်ႋ), hundred thousand. For example, one million would be loud/thein luh chi (လုဂ်/သိင်ႋလ်ုဆီ့), "hundred thousand of tens"; two million would be loud/thay ne chi (လုဂ်/သိင့်ၮီ့ဆီ့), hundred thousand of two tens; ten million would be loud/thay luh pong (လုဂ်/သိင်ႋလ်ုဖင်ႋ), "hundred thousand of hundreds"; one billion would be loud/thay luh lah (လုဂ်/သိင်ႋလ်ုလာ), "hundred thousand of ten thousands".

=== Decimals ===
Due to the close approximation to Thailand, the Eastern Pwo Karen adopts Thai's decimal word, chut, (Karen: ကျူဒ်, ကျူ(ဒ်); Thai: จุด; English: and, dot). For example, 1.01 is luh chut ploh plih luh (လ်ု ပၠဝ်ပၠေလ်ု).

=== Fractions ===
Fractions are formed by saying puh (ပုံႉ) after the numerator and the denominator. For example, one-third (^{1}/_{3}) would be luh puh thuh puh (လ်ုပုံသိုင့်ပုံ) and three over one, three-"oneths" (^{3}/_{1}) would be thuh puh luh puh (သိုင့်ပုံလ်ုပုံ).
