= Talabaw =

Soup from Myanmar

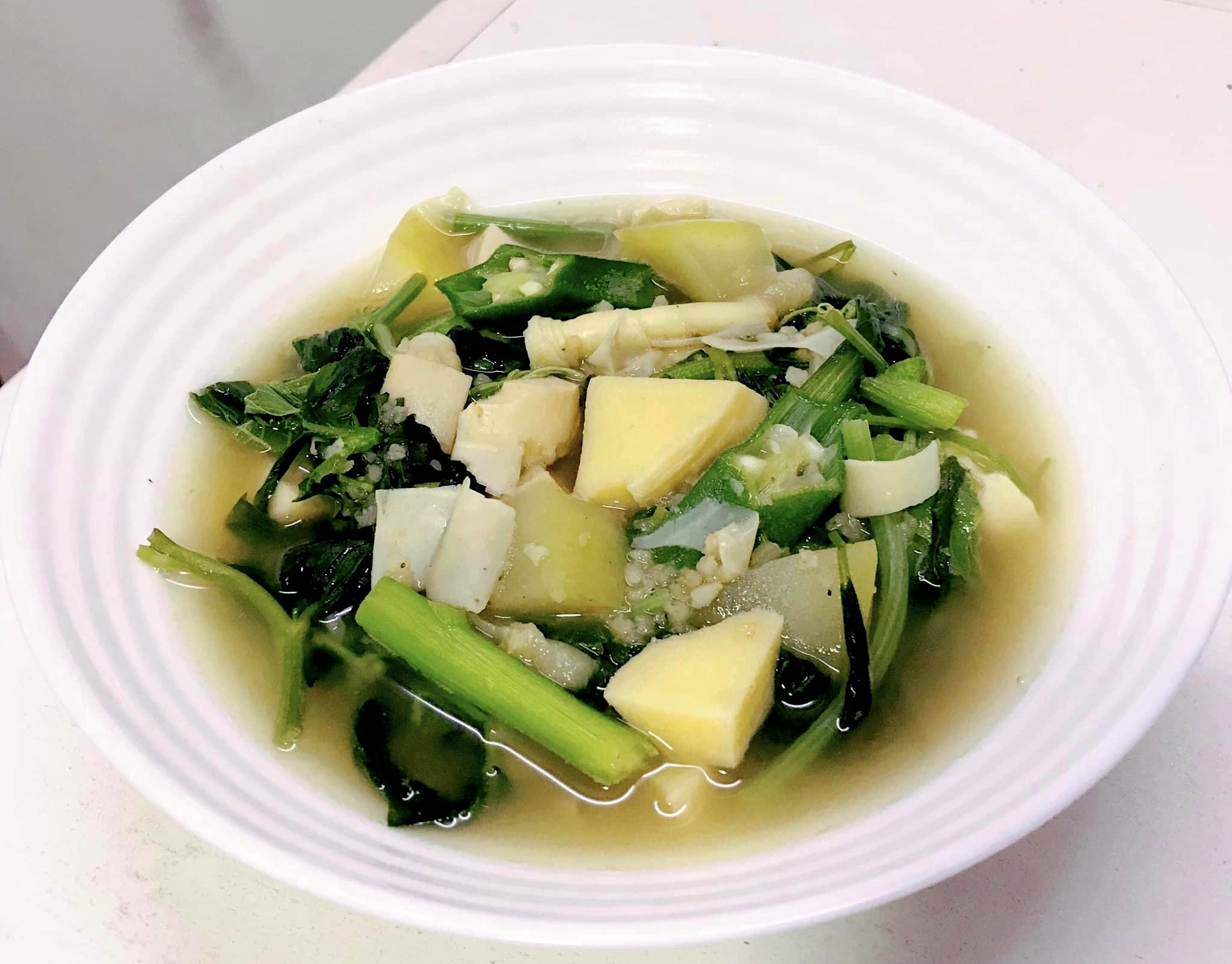
- Talabaw soup
- Alternative names: Takapaw
- Type: soup
- Place of origin: Myanmar
- Associated cuisine: Karen cuisine
- Created by: Karen people
- Main ingredients: bamboo shoot, snakehead fish
- Ingredients generally used: Fish sauce, fish paste, rice powder, pepper powder, chicken powder, green chilli, okra, lemongrass, basil leaf, climbing wattle leaf, drumstick leaf, bean curd

Talabaw (S'gaw Karen: တၢ်လပီၣ်, Burmese: တာလပေါ, Burmese pronunciation: [tàləbɔ́]; also transliterated as talapaw, lit. 'great soup' in Karen), is a soup that originated in Karen cuisine. It is typically prepared with bamboo shoots, snakehead fish and basil leaves. A small amount of rice and some shreds of meat or seafood may also be added.

The Karen traditionally used the soup to supplement rice, which was not cheaply available to them, consuming a large amount of soup with a small amount of rice in order to conserve the valuable rice.

Talabaw is one of the most well-known soups in Myanmar, and widely considered to be the essential dish of Karen cuisine.

== Origin ==
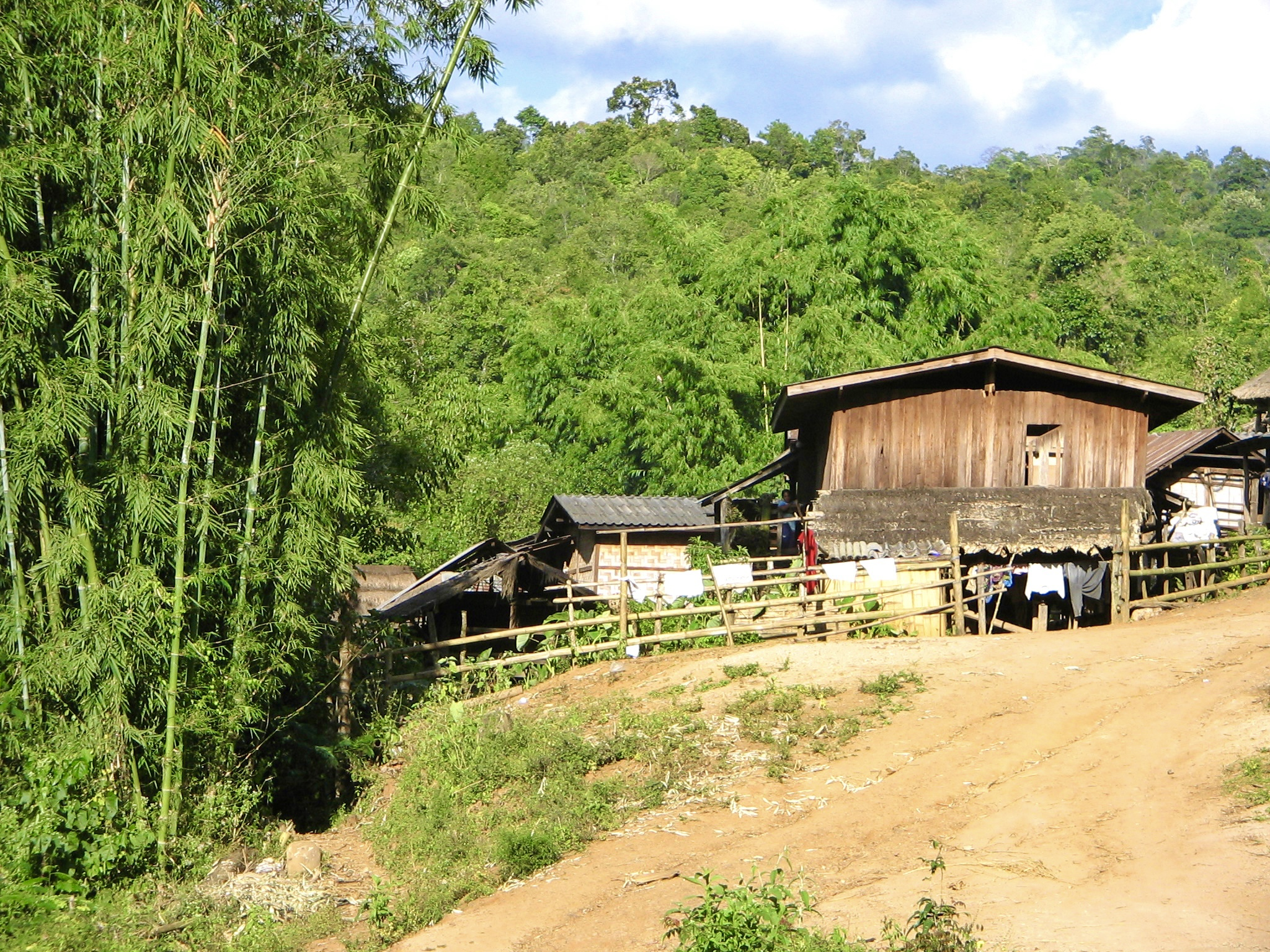
A Karen village near a bamboo grove

Traditionally, the Karen people lived in wooded areas, only rarely visiting nearby towns. As, in lieu of buying food at the town market, they foraged in the forest, where there was often plenty of bamboo, especially during the monsoon season. Bamboo shoots have become the primary and essential ingredient of the talabaw soup.

== Ingredients and preparation ==
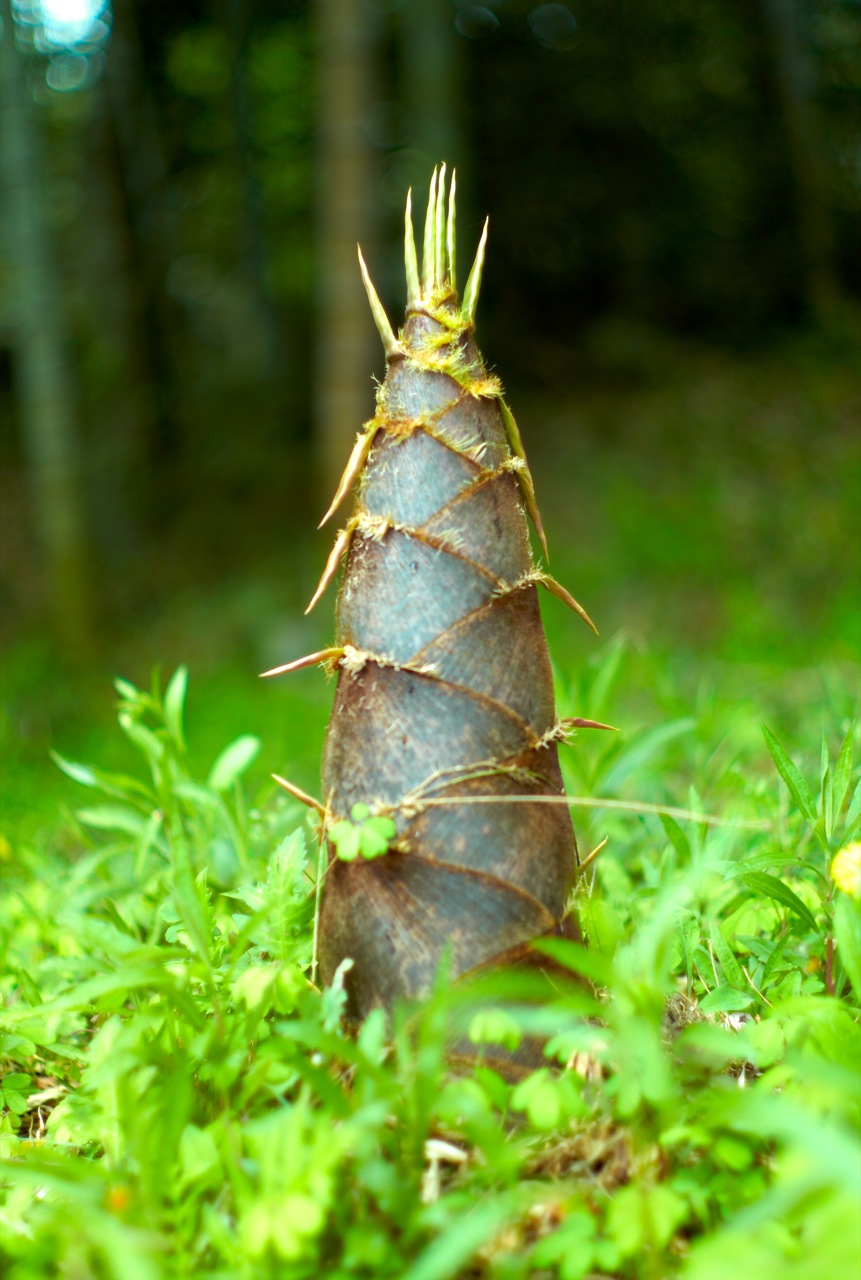
The main ingredient bamboo shoot

Bamboo shoots are used either fresh or fermented; some recipes call for lacto-fermented shoots, which are usually used when bamboo is not in season. The common preference is for giant bamboo whenever it is available, as it has a sweeter taste. It can be cooked mainly with rattan buds, long pepper catkins, and unripe jackfruit.

Typical additional ingredients are snakehead fish (and/or other types of seafood, or meat), lemongrass, drumstick leaves, basil leaves, climbing wattle leaves, okra, fish paste, bean curd, pepper powder, chicken powder, green chillies, fish sauce, tamarind juice, and rice powder along with salt.

Preparation involves rinsing bamboo shoots in water several times before boiling the inner shoots. Recipes typically call for cutting the shoots into thin slices, then giving them an extended boil to tenderize before adding other ingredients in a specified order for further simmering.

A small amount of ground rice as well as shreds of meat or seafood may also be added. The soup is cooked until the rice and meat have become tender, and then chopped vegetables are added. The soup is typically served with a small amount of cooked rice.

There are multiple regional and family variations; some versions are as thick as stew and some are closer to a broth.

== Cultural promotion and tourism ==
The first Karen traditional food exhibition and talabaw cooking competition were held at Zwekabin Hall in Hpa-an on July 8, 2018, by Myanmar Restaurant Association and Kayin State Government. The event was designed to showcase traditional foods of the Karen people as tourist attractions. The Chief Minister Nang Khin Htwe Myint said that she wanted everyone visiting Kayin State to get into the habit of eating talabaw.

== See also ==
- Menma
