= List of Karen =

List of notable Karen people, of the Asian ethnic group

List of notable Karen people:

- Taung Galay Sayadaw, Karen Buddhist monk, prolific writer and historian
- Cynthia Maung, doctor, winner of the Ramon Magsaysay Award
- General Bo Mya, (1927–2006), Commander of the Karen National Union and former Chairman of the National Council of the Union of Burma
- Johnny and Luther Htoo, boy soldiers
- Naw Zipporrah Sein, Karen political activist
- Tin Soe, political prisoner
- Naw Phaw Eh Htar, Karen actress
- Louisa Benson Craig, two-time beauty pageant winner and rebel leader
- Lucas Blesser, the first Karen licensed teacher in Minnesota
- Ehtalow Za, a Minnesota teacher and one of the first teachers in the state licensed to teach Karen
- Remona Htoo, author of one of the first Karen language children's books
- Ler Htoo, sergeant in the St. Paul, Minnesota police department and the first Karen police officer in the United States
- June Way, MSW, LGSW, Karen community leader, therapist, and board member of the Karen Organization of Minnesota
