= Karen peoples =

Ethnolinguistic group indigenous to Myanmar

Karen
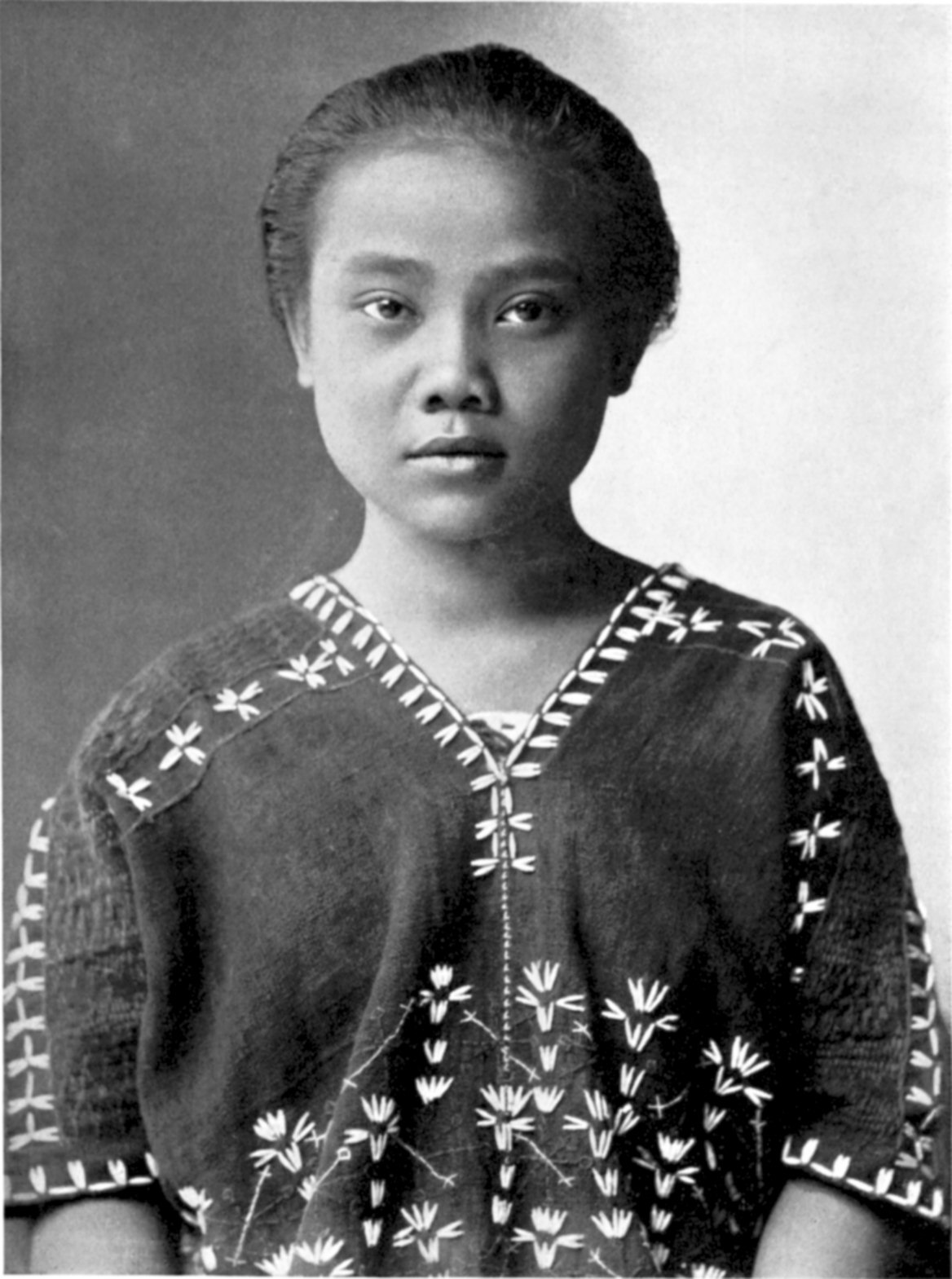
- Karen woman in traditional attire, 1912

Regions with significant populations
- Myanmar: 3,371,100
- Thailand: 350,000 (2000)
- United States: 215,000
- Australia: 13,113
- Canada: 6,050
- India (Andaman Islands): 2,500

Languages
- Karen languages, including S'gaw Karen, Pwo Karen, Karenni and Pa'O

Religion
- Theravada Buddhism, Christianity, Lehkai Ariya, Telakhon, Karen folk religion

The Karen (Note: S'gaw Karen: ကညီကလုာ်, pronounced [kɲɔklɯ]; Pwo Western Karen: ၦဖျိၩ့ဆၨၩ; Pwo Eastern Karen: ပ်ုဖၠုံဆိုဒ်; Burmese: ကရင်လူမျိုး, pronounced [kəjɪ̀ɰ̃ lù mjó]; Thai: กะเหรี่ยง) (/kəˈrɛn/ kə-REN), also known as the Kayin, are an ethnolinguistic group of peoples who speak Karenic languages and are indigenous to southern and southeastern Myanmar, including the Irrawaddy delta and Kayin State. The Karen account for around 6.69% of the Burmese population. The Karen consist of approximately 20 subgroups, the largest of whom are the S'gaw and the Pwo peoples. Other Karenic-speaking peoples like the Pa'O, Karenni, and the Kayan, have formed distinct identities.

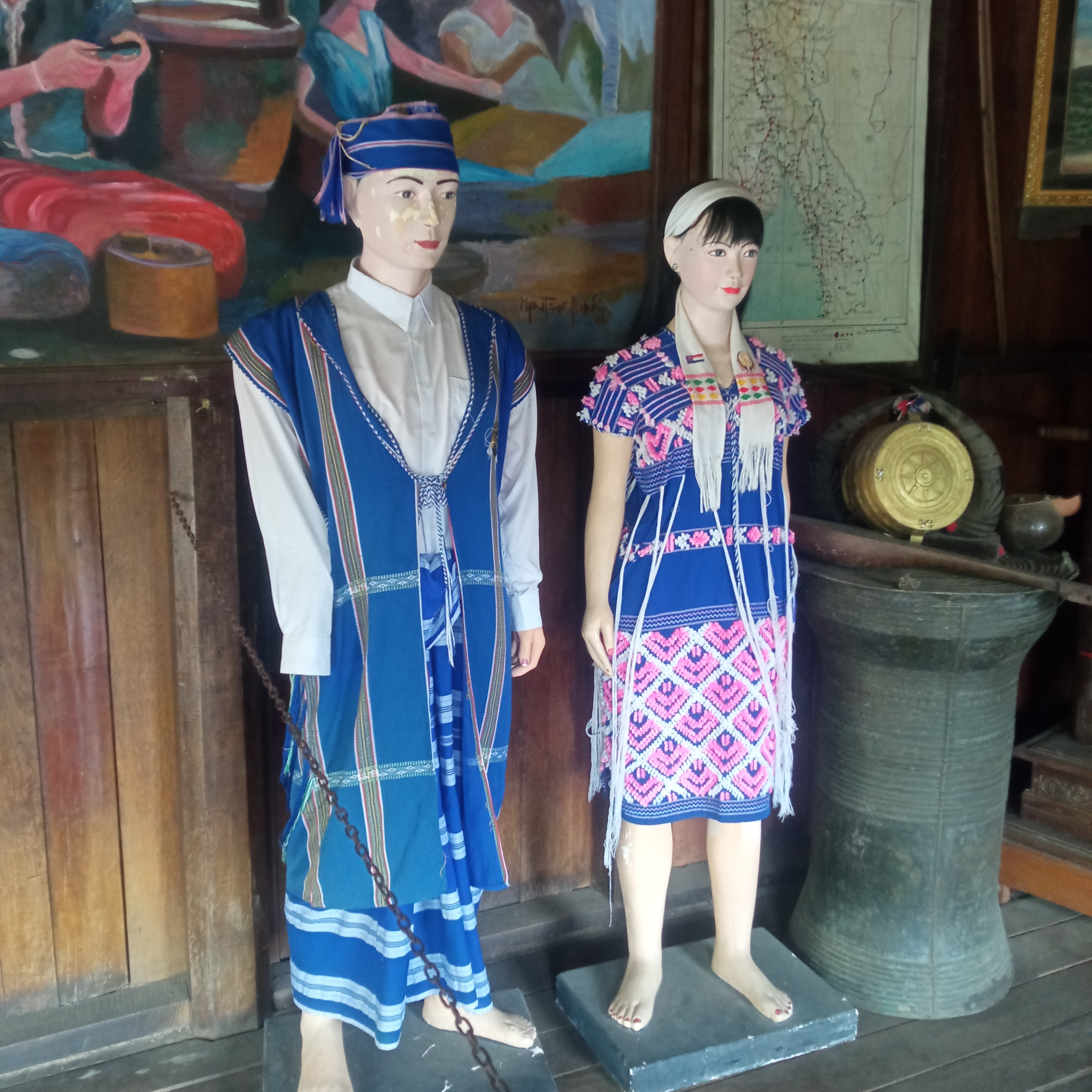
Traditional Karen national attire for men and women

The ethnic identity of the Karen peoples has significantly been shaped by British colonial rule, Christian missionaries, decolonisation, and sociopolitical developments in Myanmar. The group as a whole is heterogeneous and disparate, as many Karenic ethnic groups do not share a common language, culture, religion, or material characteristics. A pan-Karen ethnic identity is a relatively modern creation, established in the 19th century with the conversion of some Karen to Christianity, and mediated by British colonial policies and practices.

Karen insurgent groups, led primarily by the Karen National Union (KNU), have waged war against the Burmese government since early 1949. The original aim of the KNU was to create an independent Karen homeland called Kawthoolei, but since 1976 they have shifted towards calling for a federal system in Myanmar instead. Even so, the KNU has declined invitations to speak with the Burmese junta.

== Ethnonyms ==
The Karen are known by various ethnonyms, including Kayin (ကရင်) in Burmese, Kariang (ကရေၚ်) in Mon, and Yang (ယၢင်း) in Shan. "Karen" is an Anglicisation of the Burmese exonym "Kayin," whose etymology is unclear. The word may have originally been a derogatory term referring to non-Buddhist ethnic groups, or it may derive from Kanyan, possibly a Mon name of a vanished civilisation.

In pre-colonial times, Burmese and Mon kingdoms recognised two general categories of Karen, the Talaing Kayin (တလိုင်းကရင်, ကရေၚ်မန်), who were lowlander Pwo Karens who were recognised as the "original settlers" and essential to Mon court life, and the Bamar Kayin (ဗမာကရင်, ကရေၚ်ဗမာ), who were highlander S'gaw Karens who were subordinated or assimilated by the Bamar.

During colonial rule, the British adopted "Karen" as a broad label for diverse groups who speak Karenic languages and lived in the periphery of Mon and Burmese-speaking communities. The Burmese government today groups 11 subgroups under the Karen "national race":

- Karen (Kayin)
- Sgaw (S’gaw Karen)
- Pwo Karen (Pwo Kayin)
- Geba Karen (Kayinphyu)
- Pa-Le-Chi, maybe Mobwa
- Mon Kayin (Sarpyu), unknown
- Ta-Lay-Pwa, maybe Thalebwa
- Bwe (Bwe Karen)
- Monnepwa (Paku Karen)
- Monpwa, unknown
- Paku (Paku Karen)

== Distribution ==
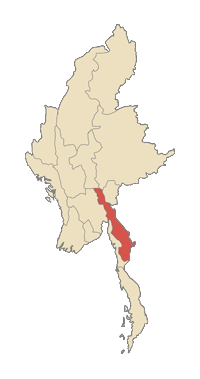
Kayin State in Myanmar

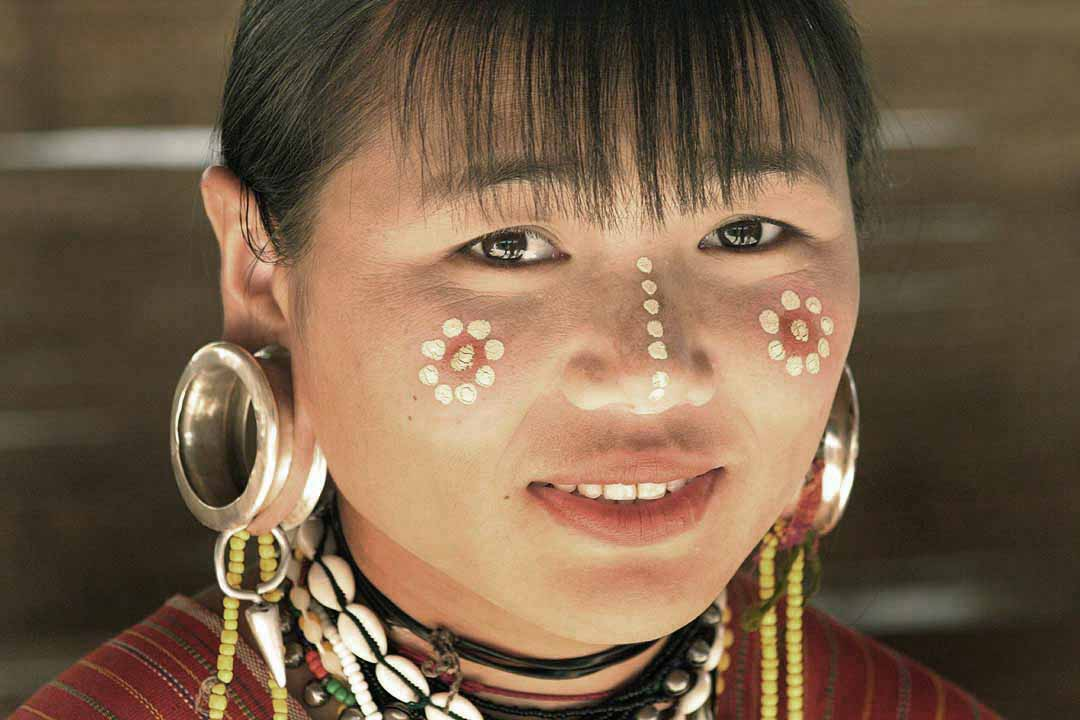
A woman of the "Big Ear" Karen

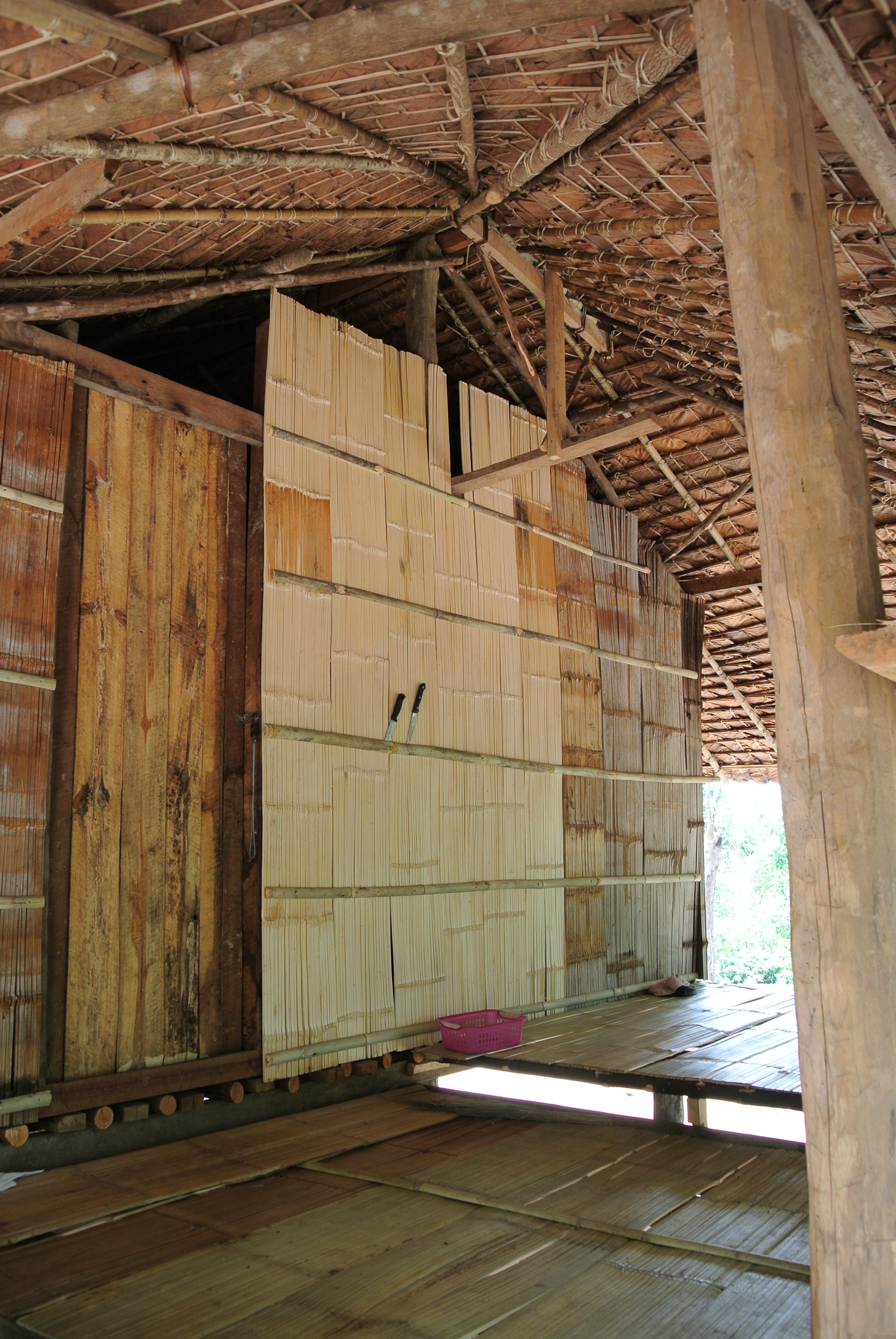
Entrance of a Karen house in northern Thailand

The Karen constitute the third largest ethnic population in Myanmar, after the Bamars and Shans. The Karen people live mostly in the hills bordering the eastern mountainous region and Irrawaddy delta of Myanmar, primarily in Kayin State (formerly Karen State), with some in Kayah State, southern Shan State, Ayeyarwady Region, Tanintharyi Region, Bago Division and in northern and western Thailand. Many Karen have migrated to Thailand, having settled mostly on the Myanmar–Thailand border. A few Karen have settled in the Andaman and Nicobar Islands, India, and other Southeast Asian and East Asian countries.

The total number of Karen is difficult to estimate. The last reliable census of Myanmar was conducted in 1931. A 2006 Voice of America article cites an estimate of seven million Karen in Myanmar.

Due to the ongoing insurgency, hundreds of thousands of Karen fled to refugee camps along the Thai-Burmese border, while many others (numbers unknown) are internally displaced within Kayin State. Some Karen have resettled elsewhere, including North America, Australia, New Zealand, and Scandinavia. In 2011, the Karen diaspora population was estimated to be approximately 67,000.

=== Thailand ===
Approximately 400,000 Karen live in Thailand, where they are by far the largest of the hill tribes.

128,000 Karen live in refugee camps on the Thai-Burmese border, the largest of which is Mae La refugee camp, in Tak province, where about 50,000 Karen refugees are hosted. According to BMC, "79% of refugees living in these camps are Karen ethnicity." According to refugee accounts, the camps suffered from overcrowding, disease, and periodic attacks by the Myanmar Army. Their lives are restricted in the camps because they usually cannot go out, and the Thai police might arrest them if they do. Employment for the Karen refugees is scarce and risky.

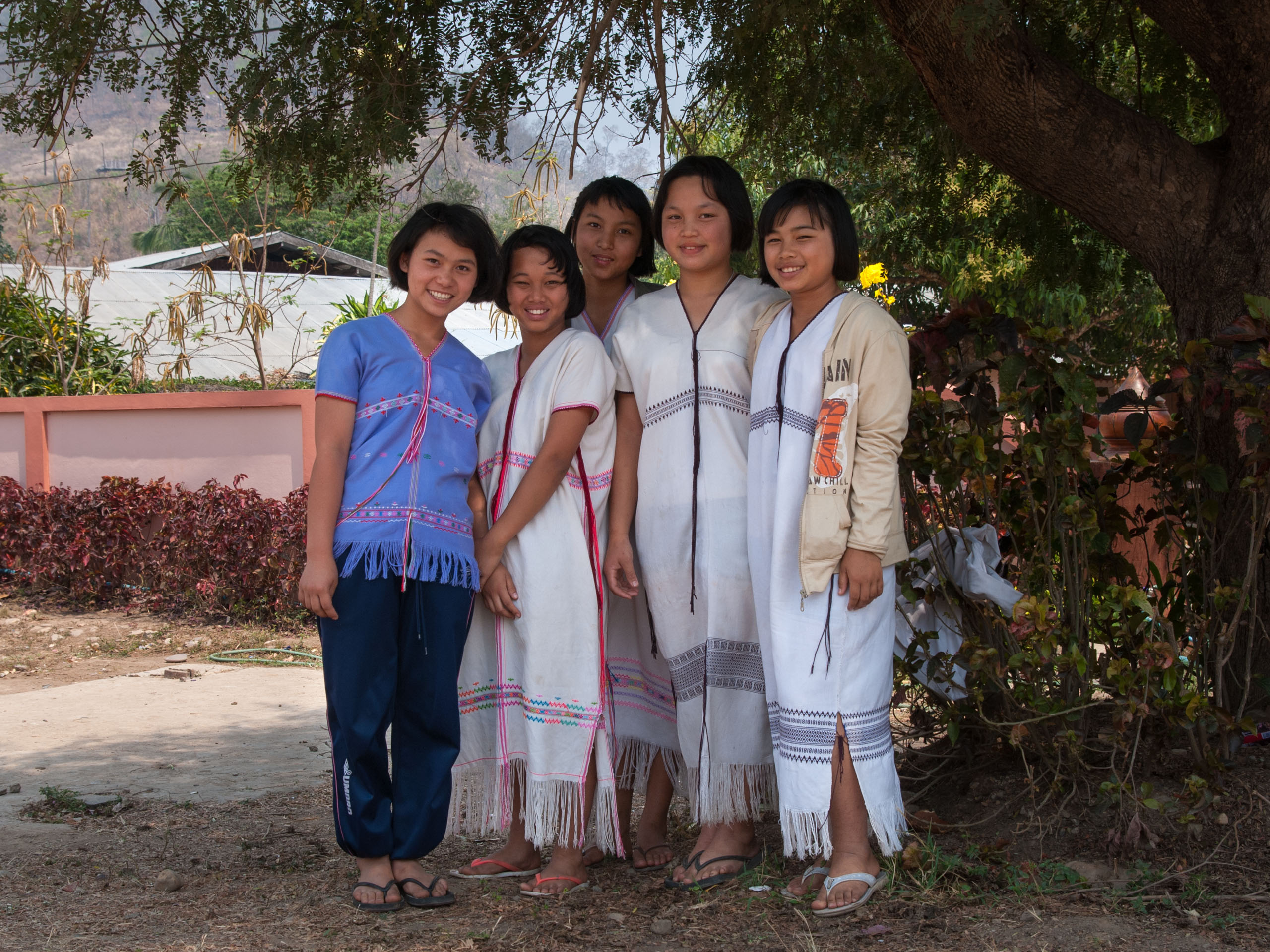
Karen girls in Khun Yuam District, Mae Hong Son Province, Thailand.

There is an established governance system in the camps, which are funded by the United Nations, and other donors. The Karen Refugee Committee governs the day-to-day administration of the camp under the authority of the Thai government which guards entrances and exits to the camp. Within the camp there is a robust school system for children up to high school. In some camps there are college courses organised by the Karen Refugee Committee – Education Entity.

=== Andaman Islands ===
There is a population of 2,500 Karen in India, mostly restricted to Mayabunder Tehsil of the Northern Andaman Islands within the union territory of the Andaman and Nicobar Islands. Nearly all of them are Baptist Protestant Christians. They retain their language to intercommunicate within community, but use Hindi as a second language to communicate with non-Karen neighbours.

=== North America ===
Beginning in 2000, the Karen started resettling in the United States and Canada. Many Karen arrive without speaking the local language. "90% of the Karen refugees reported no knowledge of English or French on arrival." An estimated 20,000 Karen live in Minnesota, primarily Saint Paul. More than 5,000 Karen live in Nebraska, and the Karen have also resettled in Southern California and central New York.

In 2014, Ler Htoo was sworn in after graduating from the St. Paul Police Academy in Minnesota as the first Karen police officer in the United States. Mu Aye is a young Karen woman who has resettled in San Diego, CA. Aye said, "After growing up in a place like I did, I wanted to become a nurse. I wanted to help sick people [...] travel to refugee camps in Thailand and care for people who cannot afford medication." Additionally, Eh De Gray, who graduated from San Diego's Crawford High School, wants to go back to the camps and share his knowledge with the school children. Gray said, "I want to share my knowledge and experiences with them."

== History ==
=== Origins ===
Karen legends refer to a "river of running sand" which their ancestors reputedly crossed. Many Karen believe this refers to the Gobi Desert, even though they have lived in Myanmar for centuries. Most scholars dismiss the notion of a Gobi desert crossing, but instead translate the legend as describing "rivers of water flowing with sand". This could refer to the sediment-laden Yellow River of China, the upper reaches of which are considered to be the Urheimat of Sino-Tibetan languages.

According to the legends, the Karen took a long time to cook shellfish at the river of flowing sand, until the Chinese taught the Karens to open the shells so as to acquire the meat. It is estimated by linguists Luce and Lehman that the Tibeto-Burman peoples such as the Karen migrated into present-day Myanmar between 300 and 800 CE.

Luce argues that the Karens were originally hill tribes that descended from the north alongside the Salween and Irrawaddy Rivers under their leaders the Sgaw and Pwo who likely learn wet rice cultivation from the older Mon-Khmer of the south and east of them. The Karens irrigated the Kyaukse and Minbu districts with the Palaung, Mon and Wa populations before Burmese arrival. Upon the Burmese arrival, the Karens were pushed out south and southwest.

During the early Burmese era, the names for the Karens were written as Karyaṅ in 1240. The inscription further discusses their tanmī prok "many coloured smock frocks", which are still worn by the hill Karen tribes. They are the sleeveless bags or "cage heads" Chinese observers recorded during documentation. Other names for the Karen historically include Toṅsū and Cakraw. Toṅsū refers to "Taungthu" which means hill-man or hill-farmer as a pure Burmese exonym. This term mostly applies to the Pă-o dialect-speaking Karens. Luce argues it was used vaguely for dry rice cultivators on the eastern borders of the plains. The term appears most frequently in inscriptions regarding slave-names as a prefix and suffix. A list of Pagoda slaves in one 1276AD inscriptions states ṅa Kantu (Mr Kantu), ṅa Cakraw (Mr Sgaw(?)) and ṅa Toṅsū (Mr Taungthu). The earliest use of Toṅsū is in Burmese inscriptions of 1165-1167AD, however there is little to no evidence to indicate and locte the Toṅsū, however Luce presupposed it to be the northern Karens of the Pagan period. Old Burmese Cakraw is provisionally identified as Sgaw by Luce. He argues this on the basis of a linguistic shift. A Pagan inscription of 1242AD states the name of 25 Mranmā slaves from Caku (Săgu) followed by 31 Cakraw slaves from Caku. Luce argues both names appear Burmese. Since Săgu was the old capital of the Six Kharuin in the Minbu district, Luce argues the Cakraw had long descended form the Karen Hills in the east and crossed the plain of Central Burma close to the Irrawaddy. A Sălin inscription from the north of the district of 1353 includes a list of boundaries of dedicated land mentions of Great Cakraw. Other inscriptions mention Cakraw canals, a Cakraw Village and Great Cakraw referring to a province.

Upon displacement by Burmans, the Karents split. The Pă-o (Taungthu) remained in the hills where they became only referenced as slaves of Pagan and had their languages influenced by the Burmans. Some southern Karens joined the Palaung to form the Toṅṅū (Toungoo) Kingdom as a rallying point against the southern expansions of the Burmese. However, this failed due to Burmese infiltration due to Shan developments in the north and the Karens were made to continue migrating south.

=== Genetics ===
Estimates suggest that the Karen began inhabiting what is now Myanmar approximately 2,500 years ago, migrating from regions that are now Mongolia and Tibet. They settled primarily in the hills bordering the eastern mountainous region of Myanmar.

Research indicates that the Karen exhibit signs of genetic isolation, suggesting a distinct genetic lineage separate from neighbouring populations. A study focusing on the Kayah (Red Karen) in Northern Thailand analysed autosomal short tandem repeats (STRs) and Y-chromosomal haplogroups. The findings revealed that the Kayah people are genetically closer to other Southeast Asian populations than to those from Northeast Asia or Tibet.

=== British colonial era ===
Following British victories in the three Anglo-Burmese wars, Myanmar was annexed as a province of British India in 1886. Baptist missionaries introduced Christianity to Myanmar beginning in 1830, and they were successful in converting many Karen. Christian Karens were favoured by the British colonial authorities and were given opportunities not available to the Burmese ethnic majority, including military recruitment and seats in the legislature. Some Christian Karens began asserting an identity apart from their non-Christian counterparts, and many became leaders of Karen ethno-nationalist organisations, including the Karen National Union.

In 1881 the Karen National Association (KNA) was founded by western-educated Christian Karens to represent Karen interests with the British. Despite its Christian leadership, the KNA sought to unite all Karens of different regional and religious backgrounds into one organisation. They argued at the 1917 Montagu–Chelmsford hearings in India that Myanmar was not "yet in a fit state for self-government". Three years later, after submitting a criticism of the 1920 Craddock Reforms, they won 5 (and later 12) seats in the Legislative Council of 130 (expanded to 132) members. The majority Buddhist Karens were not organised until 1939 with the formation of a Buddhist KNA. In 1938 the British colonial administration recognised Karen New Year as a public holiday.

==== World War II ====
During World War II, when the Japanese occupied the region, long-term tensions between the Karen and Burma turned into open fighting. As a consequence, many villages were destroyed and massacres committed by both the Japanese and the Burma Independence Army (BIA) troops who helped the Japanese invade the country. Among the victims were a pre-war Cabinet minister, Saw Pe Tha, and his family. A government report later claimed the "excesses of the BIA" and "the loyalty of the Karens towards the British" as the reasons for these attacks. The intervention by Colonel Suzuki Keiji, the Japanese commander of the BIA, after meeting a Karen delegation led by Saw Tha Din, appears to have prevented further atrocities.

Karen soldiers supported the British in Operation Character during the latter's reconquest of Burma in 1945. They inflicted heavy casualties on the Japanese and the campaign's success allowed for the swift capture of Rangoon in May 1945.

==== Post-war ====
The Karen people aspired to have the regions where they formed the majority turned into a subdivision or "state" within Myanmar similar to what the Shan, Kachin and Chin peoples had been given. A goodwill mission led by Saw Tha Din and Saw Ba U Gyi to London in August 1946 failed to receive any encouragement from the British government for any separatist demands.

In January 1947 a delegation of representatives of the Governor's Executive Council headed by Aung San was invited to London to negotiate for the Aung San–Attlee Treaty, but none of the ethnic minority groups was included by the British government. The following month at the Panglong Conference, when an agreement was signed between Aung San as head of the interim Burmese government and the Shan, Kachin and Chin leaders, the Karen were present only as observers; the Mon and Arakanese were also absent.

The British promised to consider the case of the Karen after the war. While the situation of the Karen was discussed, nothing practical was done before the British left Myanmar. The 1947 Constitution, drawn without Karen participation due to their boycott of the elections to the Constituent Assembly, also failed to address the Karen question specifically and clearly, leaving it to be discussed only after independence. The Shan and Karenni states were given the right to secession after 10 years, the Kachin their own state, and the Chin a special division. The Mon and Arakanese of Ministerial Myanmar were not given any consideration.

==== Karen National Union ====
In early February 1947, the Karen National Union (KNU) was formed at a Karen Congress attended by 700 delegates from the Karen National Associations, both Baptist and Buddhist (KNA, founded 1881), the Karen Central Organisation (KCO) and its youth wing, the Karen Youth Organisation (KYO), at Vinton Memorial Hall in Yangon. The meeting called for a Karen state with a seaboard, an increased number of seats (25%) in the Constituent Assembly, a new ethnic census, and a continuance of Karen units in the armed forces. The deadline of 3 March passed without a reply from the British government, and Saw Ba U Gyi, the first president of the KNU, resigned from the Governor's Executive Council the next day.

After the war ended, Myanmar was granted independence in January 1948, and the Karen, led by the KNU, attempted to co-exist peacefully with the Burman ethnic majority. Karen people held leading positions in both the government and the army. In the fall of 1948, the Burmese government, led by U Nu, began raising and arming irregular political militias known as Sitwundan. These militias were under the command of Major Gen. Ne Win and outside the control of the regular army. In January 1949, some of these militias went on a rampage through Karen communities.

The Karen National Union has maintained its structure and purpose from the 1950s onward. The KNU acts as a governmental presence for the Karen people, offering basic social services for those affected by the insurgency, such as Karen refugees or internally displaced Karen. These services include building school systems in Thailand and inside Burma, providing medical services, regulating trade and commerce, and providing security through the Karen National Liberation Army (KNLA), the KNU's army.

=== Post-colonial insurgency ===
In late January 1949, the Army Chief of Staff, Gen. Smith Dun, a Karen, was removed from office and imprisoned. He was replaced by the Burmese nationalist Ne Win. Simultaneously a commission was looking into the Karen problem and this commission was about to report their findings to the Burmese government. The findings of the report were overshadowed by this political shift at the top of the Burmese government. The Karen National Defence Organisation (KNDO), formed in July 1947, then rose up in an insurgency against the government. They were helped by the defections of the Karen Rifles and the Union Military Police (UMP) units which had been successfully deployed in suppressing the earlier Burmese Communist rebellions, and came close to capturing Yangon itself. The most notable was the Battle of Insein, nine miles from Yangon, where they held out in a 111-day siege till late May 1949.

Years later, the Karen had become the largest of 20 minority groups participating in an insurgency against the military dictatorship in Yangon. During the 1980s, the Karen National Liberation Army (KNLA) fighting force numbered approximately 20,000. After an uprising of the people of Myanmar in 1988, known as the 8888 Uprising, the KNLA had accepted those demonstrators in their bases along the border. The dictatorship expanded the army and launched a series of major offensives against the KNLA. By 2006, the KNLA's strength had shrunk to less than 4,000, opposing what is now a 400,000-man Burmese army. However, the political arm of the KNLA – the KNU – continued efforts to resolve the conflict through political means.

Religious tensions within the KNLA worsened conditions, as most front-line soldiers were Buddhists or traditionalists, while their mostly Christian leaders—often Baptists or Seventh-day Adventists—were accused of discrimination, abuse, and using child soldiers. Reports also cited forced recruitment and corruption within the KNLA. Disillusionment and government influence led many fighters to defect to the government-backed Democratic Karen Buddhist Army (DKBA) in 1994, which then helped the Burmese military capture the key KNU stronghold of Manerplaw, during the 1995 Fall of Manerplaw.

A new KNU headquarter was established in Mu Aye Pu, on the Burmese–Thai border. In 2004, the BBC, citing aid agencies, estimates that up to 200,000 Karen have been driven from their homes during decades of war, with 160,000 more refugees from Myanmar, mostly Karen, living in refugee camps on the Thai side of the border.

A 2005 New York Times article on a report by Guy Horton into depredations by the Myanmar Army against the Karen and other groups in eastern Myanmar stated:

Using victims' statements, photographs, maps and film, and advised by legal counsel to the UN tribunal on the former Yugoslavia, he purports to have documented slave labour, systematic rape, the conscription of child soldiers, massacres and the deliberate destruction of villages, food sources and medical services.

Reports as recently as February 2010, state that the Burmese army continues to burn Karen villages, displacing thousands of people. Many Karen, including people such as former KNU secretary Padoh Mahn Sha Lah Phan and his daughter, Zoya Phan, have accused the military government of Myanmar of ethnic cleansing. The US State Department has also cited the Burmese government for suppression of religious freedom.

DKBA officially integrated into Myanmar’s military structure as the Kayin Border Guard Force (BGF) on 18 August 2010. This transition placed the DKBA under the command of the Tatmadaw (Myanmar’s national army), effectively dissolving it as an independent insurgent group.

== Language ==
The Karen languages, members of the Tibeto-Burman group of the Sino-Tibetan language family, consist of three mutually unintelligible branches: Sgaw, Eastern Pwo, and Western Pwo. The Karen languages are almost unique among the Tibeto-Burman languages in having a subject–verb–object word order; other than Karen and Bai, Tibeto-Burman languages typically feature a subject–object–verb order. This anomaly is likely due to the influence of neighbouring Mon and Tai languages. The Karen languages are written using a modified form of the Mon–Burmese script.

== Religion ==
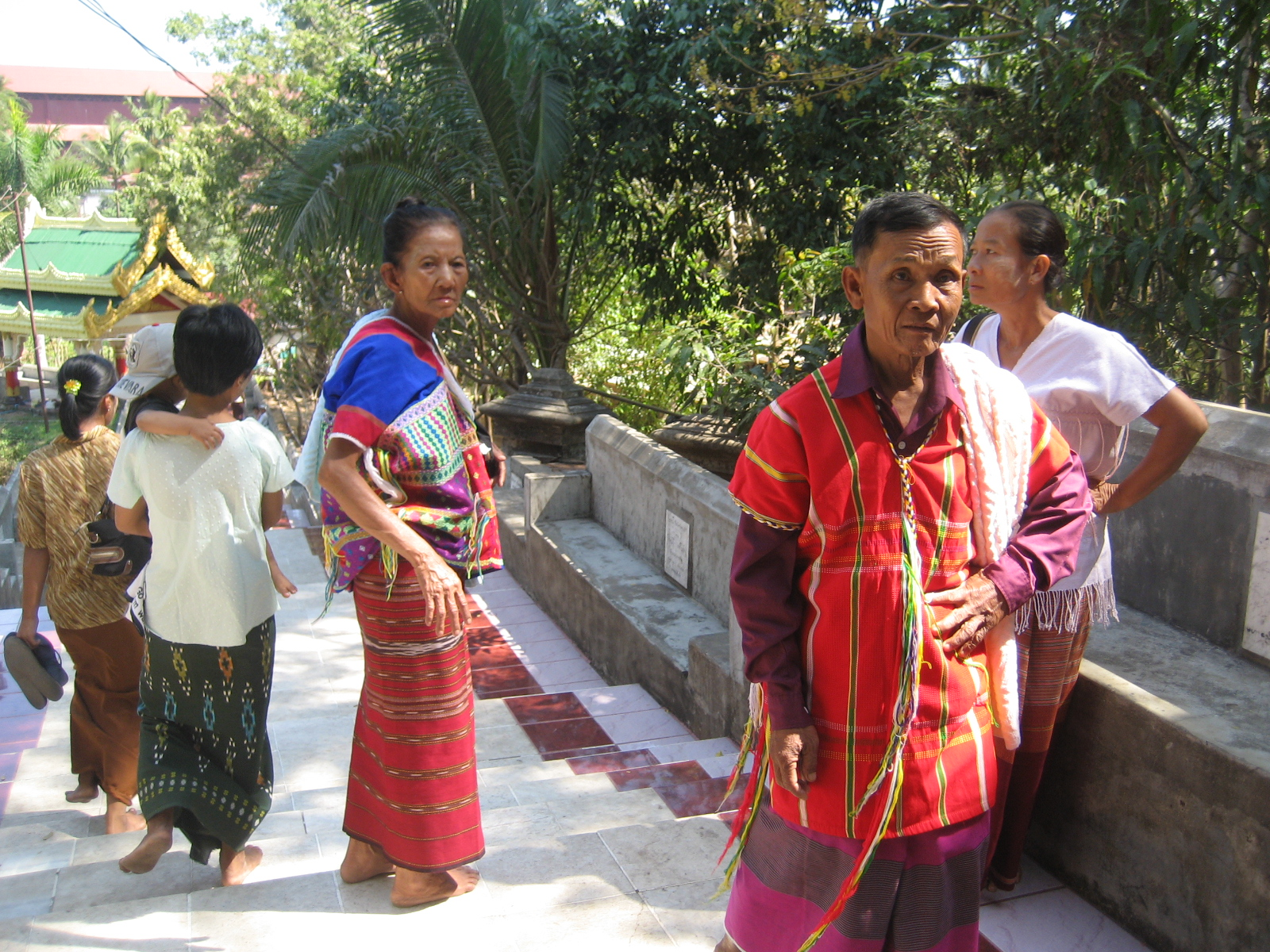
Buddhist Karen pilgrims at Ngahtatgyi Pagoda in Yangon

The majority of Karen are Theravada Buddhists who also practice animism, while approximately 15–30 per cent are Christian. Lowland Pwo-speaking Karens tend to be more orthodox Buddhists, whereas highland Sgaw-speaking Karens tend to be heterodox Buddhists who profess strong animist beliefs.

=== Animism ===
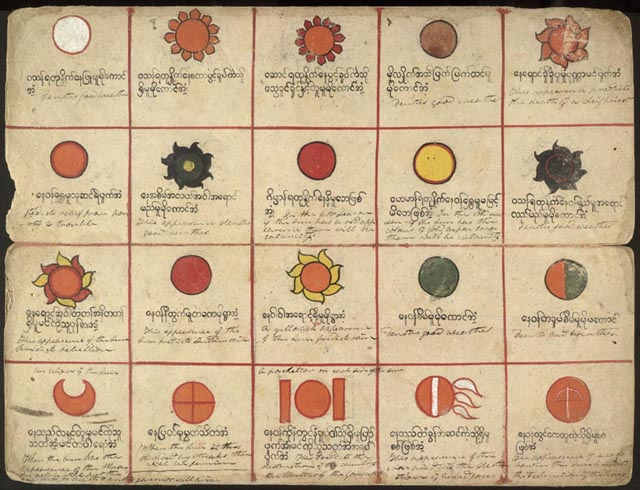
Mid-19th century manuscript, possibly of Sgaw Karen origin.

Karen animism is defined by a belief in ကလၤ k'lar (soul), thirty-seven spirits that embody every individual. Misfortune and sickness are believed to be caused by k'lar that wander away, and death occurs when all thirty-seven klar leave the body.

=== Buddhism ===
Karen Buddhists are the most numerous of the Karens and account for around 65 per cent of the total Karen population. The Buddhist influence came from the Mon who were dominant in Lower Burma until the middle of the 18th century. Buddhist Karen are found mainly in Kayin State, Mon State, Yangon, Bago and Tanintharyi Region. There are Buddhist monasteries in most Karen villages, and the monastery is the centre of community life. Merit-making activities, such as alms giving, are central to Karen Buddhist life.

Buddhism was brought to Pwo-speaking Karens in the late-1700s, and the Yedagon Monastery atop Mount Zwegabin became the leading center of Karen language Buddhist literature. Many millennial sects were founded throughout the 1800s, led by Karen Buddhist minlaung rebels. Two sects, Telakhon (or Telaku) and Leke, were founded in the 1860s. The Telaku sect, founded in Kyaing and considered a Buddhist sect, is a mixture of spirit worship, Karen customs and worship of the future Buddha Metteyya. The Leke sect was founded on the western banks of the Thanlwin River, and is no longer associated with Buddhism (as followers do not venerate Buddhist monks).

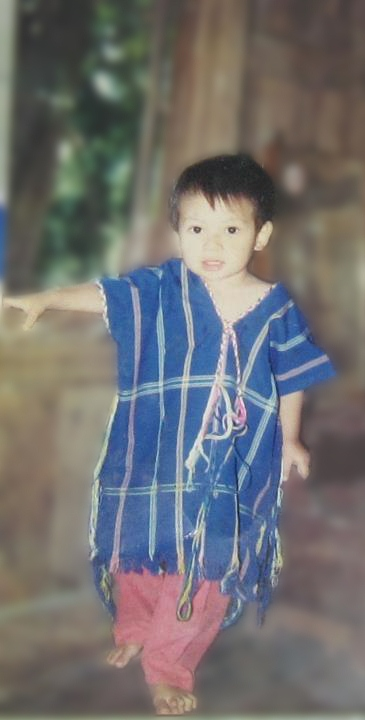
A Karen boy wearing traditional clothing

Followers believe that the future Buddha will return to Earth if they maintain their moral practices (following the Dharma and precepts), and they practice vegetarianism, hold Saturday services and construct distinct pagodas. Several Buddhist socioreligious movements, both orthodox and heterodox, have arisen in the past century. Duwae, a type of pagoda worship, with animistic origins, is also practised.

There are several prominent Karen Buddhist monks, including Thuzana (S'gaw), Taung Galay Sayadaw, and Zagara, who was conferred the Agga Maha Saddammajotika title by the Burmese government in 2004.

The Karen of Thailand have their own religion, but some have converted to Buddhism through the efforts of missionaries. In 1965, the Dhammacharik Buddhist missionary program began to convert Thai hill tribes from traditional religions to Buddhism, in order to foster a Thai national identity among them, and to secure their loyalty to Thailand. Its most significant success has been in education, especially by ordaining Karen boys as novice monks and providing them with monastic education, with some eventually attaining college degrees. This is a continuing practice in modern times in which young Karen boys (known as samanera) devote themselves to learning Buddhism under the guidance and teachings of monks.

=== Christianity ===
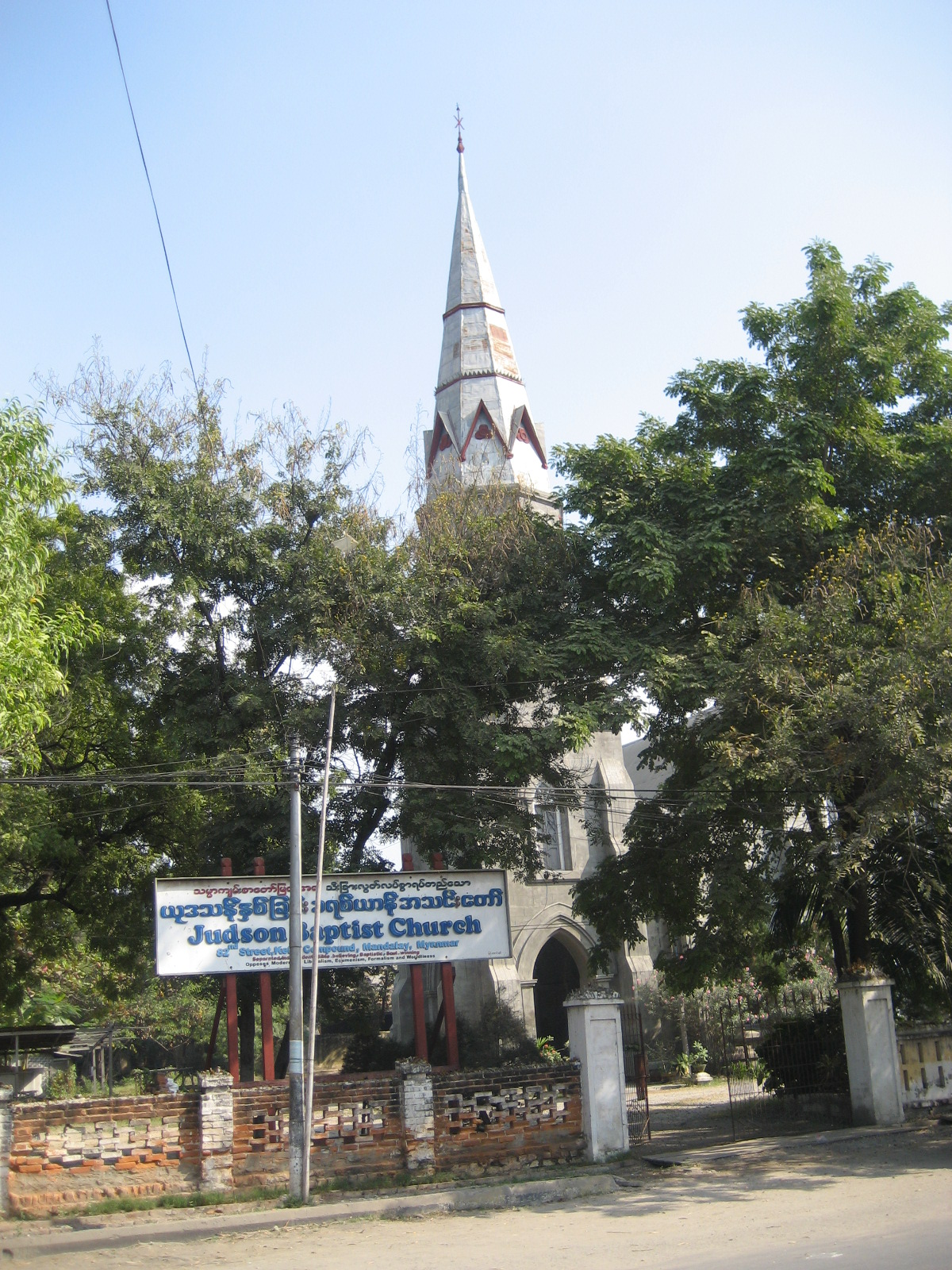
Judson Memorial Baptist Church is the main place of worship for the Karen community in Mandalay, Myanmar.

Some Karens who identify as Christian also have included elements of animism within their practice of Christianity. An estimated 15 to 20 per cent of Karens identify as Christians today and about 90 per cent of Karens in the United States are Christians. Though other estimates put the Karen Christian population as high as 30 per cent.

Tha Byu, the first convert to Christianity in 1828, was baptised by Rev. George Boardman, an associate of Adoniram Judson, founder of the American Baptist Foreign Mission Society. Today there are Christians belonging to the Catholic Church and various Protestant denominations. Some of the largest Protestant denominations are Baptists and Seventh-day Adventists.

A popular legend among the Karen people concerns a prophecy about a book which had been lost and would be returned by a "white brother". This is held to have been fulfilled when the first American Baptist missionaries brought the Bible to the Karen people, but this legend is probably of nineteenth-century origin.

The Karen Baptist Convention (KBC) was established in 1913. Its headquarters is in Yangon with 20 member associations throughout Myanmar. The KBC operates the KBC Charity Hospital in Insein, Yangon. The KBC also operates the Karen Baptist Theological Seminary in Insein. The seminary runs a theology program as well as a secular degree program (Liberal Arts Programme) to fulfill young Karens' intellectual and vocational needs. The Pwo Karen Baptist Convention is in Ahlone, Yangon and also operates the Pwo Karen Theological Seminary. There are other schools for Karen people in Myanmar, such as Paku Divinity School in Taungoo, Kothabyu Bible School in Pathein, and Yangon Home Mission School. The Thailand Karen Baptist Convention is in Chiang Mai, Thailand.

The Seventh-day Adventists have built several schools in the Karen refugee camps in Thailand. Eden Valley Academy in Tak and Karen Adventist Academy in Mae Hong Son are the two largest Seventh-day Adventist Karen schools.

== Culture ==
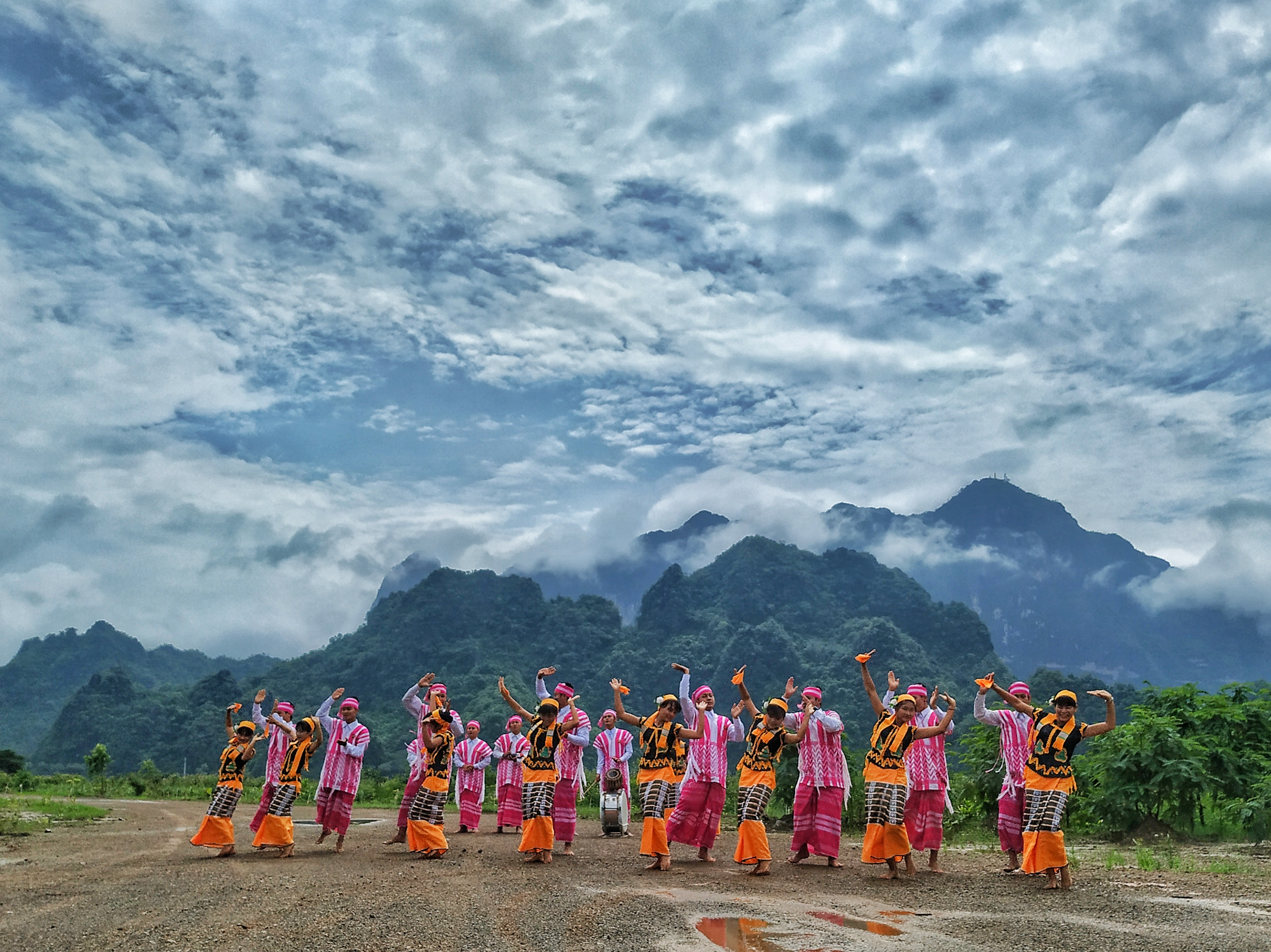
Karen traditional don dance team

Crop rotation agriculture has been a part of Karen culture for at least several hundred years.

The don dance is a traditional Karen performance. "Don" roughly translates to "in agreement". The dance is a series of uniform movements accompanied by music played from traditional Karen instruments. During the performance, a "Don Koh" leads the troupe of dancers. The don dance originated from the Pwo Karen, who developed it as a way to reinforce community values.

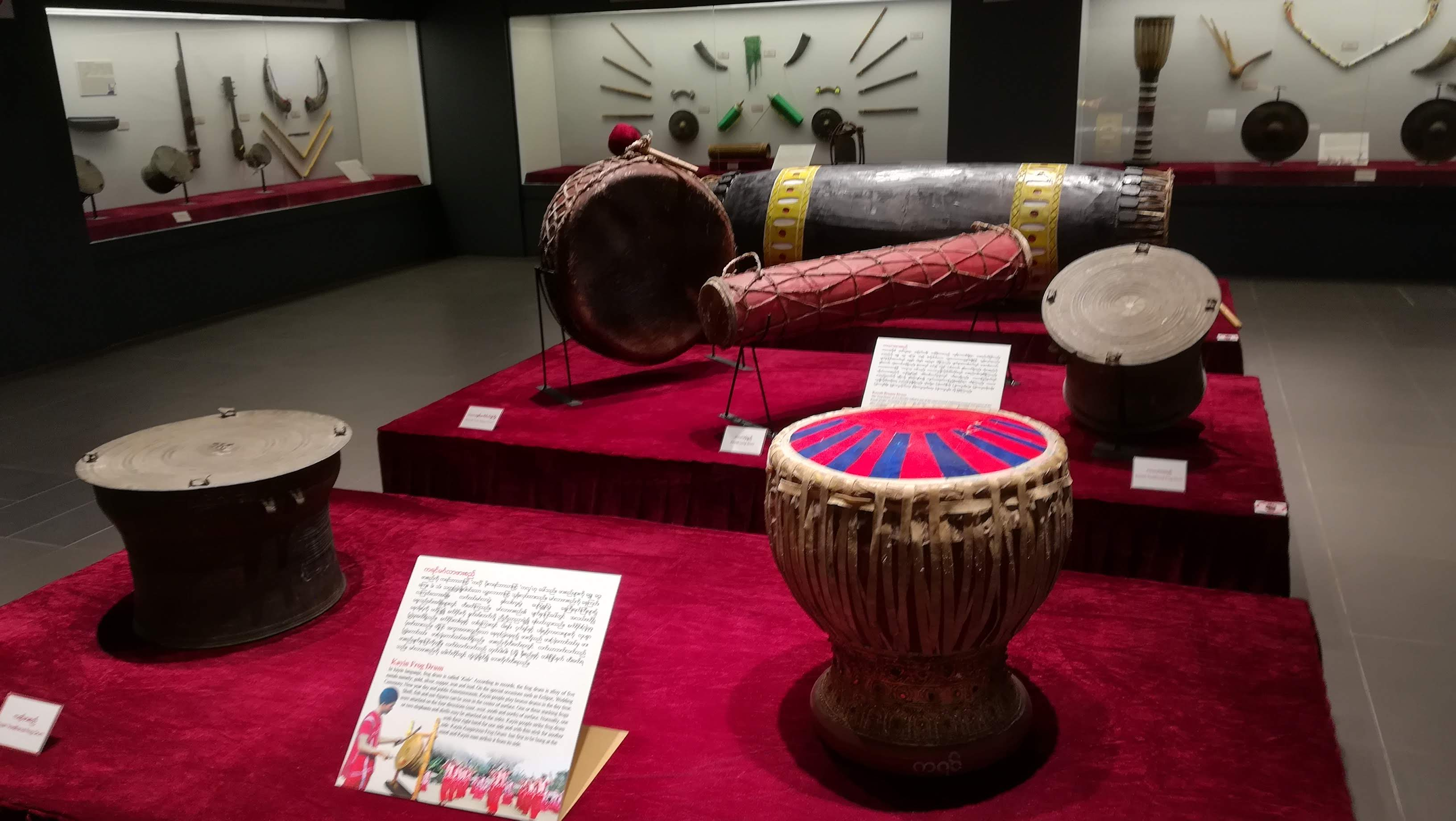
Karen traditional musical instruments on display at the National Museum of Myanmar in Naypyidaw

The sae klee dance or bamboo dance is a traditional Karen performance held during celebrations such as Christmas and New Year's. Performers are typically divided into two groups. One group creates a platform by holding bamboo sticks in a checkered pattern, while the other group dances on top of the platform. Dancers must be careful to avoid stepping into one of the platform's many holes.

=== Cuisine ===
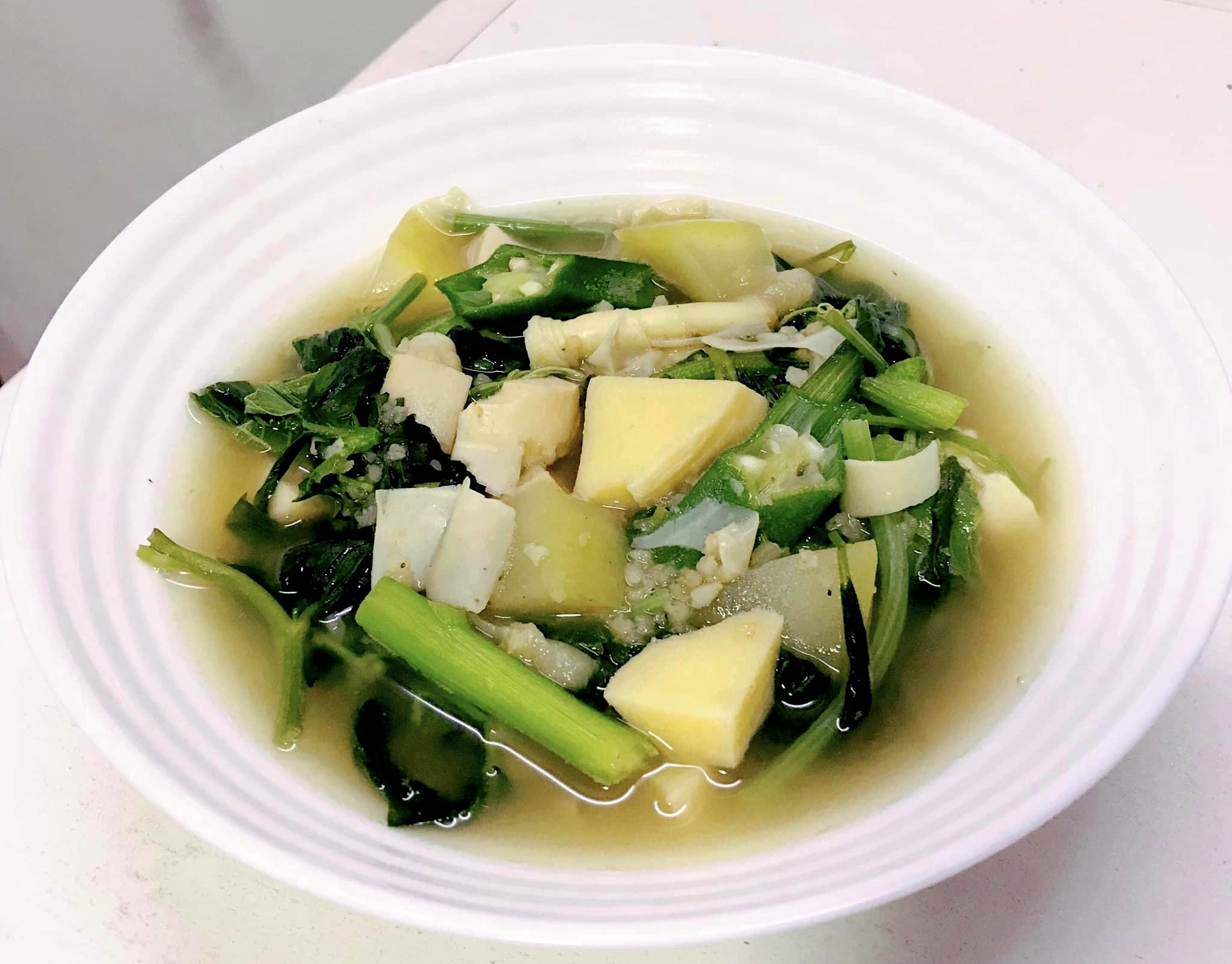
Talabaw, a traditional bamboo soup

Talabaw or bamboo soup is a traditional Karen dish typically prepared with bamboo shoots, snakehead fish and basil leaves. A small amount of rice and some shreds of meat or seafood may also be added. The soup was traditionally used as a supplement to rice, which was not readily or cheaply available to them. Talabaw is one of the best-known soups in Myanmar, and widely considered to be the essential dish of Karen cuisine.

=== Holidays ===
The Karen New Year (S'gaw Karen: ကညီနံၣ်ထီၣ်သီ; Pwo Eastern Karen: ဖၠုံဏိင်းထင်းသင့်) is one of the major holidays that the Karen people celebrate. The date of the Karen New Year on the Gregorian calendar varies as the Karen people use the lunar calendar. The Karen New Year usually falls on a date in December or January on the Gregorian calendar.

Karen National Day is commemorated on 11 February.

Karen Wrist Tying (S'gaw Karen: ကညီလါခူးကံၢ်စု; Pwo Eastern Karen: ဖၠုံဆိုဒ်ဖေါဟ်ထူရူ့လာခုဂ်ခါင်ႋစူး) is an important Karen holiday. This holiday is observed annually in August.

Karen Martyrs' Day (Ma Tu Ra) commemorates the Karen soldiers who have died fighting for Karen self-determination. It is observed annually on 12 August, the anniversary of the death of Saw Ba U Gyi, the first President of the Karen National Union.

== Eponyms ==
A species of gecko, Hemidactylus karenorum, is named in honour of the Karen people.

== See also ==
- U Thuzana
- Taung Galay Sayadaw
- Saddan Cave
- Karenni
- Karen Baptist Convention
- Karen Baptist Theological Seminary
- Karen of the Andamans
- Karen Teacher Working Group
- List of Karen
- Paku Divinity School
- Rambo, 2008 film
