= Karen people in the Andaman Islands =

Karenic ethnic group

Karen people (Andaman Islands)
Total population
- 2,000

Languages
- Karenic languages (S'gaw Karen)

Religion
- Christianity

The Karen people are an ethnic group native to Kayin State, Myanmar. In the Andaman and Nicobar Islands of India, they live in various villages of North and Middle Andaman district.

== History ==
In 1924, Dr. Marshall, the principal of the Karen Baptist Theological Seminary, visited Michael Lloyd Ferrar, the Chief Commissioner of the Andaman and Nicobar Islands. Following the visit, Dr. Marshall encouraged the remaining ancestors of the Karen people to settle there.

In 1925, the first thirteen families arrived, led by a priest, named Reverend Luige. In 1926, another fifty families arrived, and the first Karen village, named Web, was founded on the Middle Andaman Island. The people of Web worked as foresters, which was the original reason the British government had for moving them to the Islands, with the help of the missionaries. The population of the village was about 500 people in 2009.

In 2004, the total population of Karen in the Andamans was about 2,000 people, living in eight villages in the Mayabunder (Webi, Deopur, Lataw, Lucknow, Karmatang-9 and Karmatang-10) and Diglipur (Borang and Chipon) tehsils of the North and Middle Andaman district. On 12 December 2005, the government reserved government jobs and places in higher education for the Karen as one of the Other Backward Classes in the Andaman and Nicobar Islands.

Today, the Karen group form a small yet vital community on the island. They are currently trying to attain the status of Scheduled Tribe in India, a title which would grant them more special privileges and concessions when compared to under-developed groups within the country.

The Karen people believe that in order to respect nature they should avoid spitting or urinating in forests. They promote sustainable harvesting and avoid killing female animals when hunting. They use a variety of forest plants for construction. For example, they make canoes from the trunks of mulberry trees (Artocarpus chaplasha Roxb.) and use a paste of the sweet flag vanity with other aromatic plants as a poultice for colds and headaches.

To educate the community, the Government Secondary School (GSS) in Web was established in 1928 by the family of Reverend Luigi. The Karen language was not formally taught for about 50 years, and Karen language textbooks were not available. The country's first textbook in the Karen language was published in 2010 after a group of local teachers convinced the district administration to support the initiative. As of 2018, Karen is officially taught as a language till Class V at GSS Web.

== See also ==
- Andaman Karen Musley rice
