= Karen Teacher Working Group =

The Karen Teachers Working Group (KTWG) is a community based organisation founded in 1997 that works to promote and improve education in Karen State. The organisation helps to fund Karen Education Department Schools and conducts pre service and in service teacher training. KTWG provides assistance to around 1000 KED or mixed authority schools.

The organisation was the subject of a 2016 Save the Children report which recognised the significance of KTWG in both national and ethnic education spheres and found substantial evidence that KTWG was contributing to "reducing student drop out rates, increasing student participation rates, improving ethnic teacher retention rates and improving ethnic teacher competency and skills in student-centred teaching pedagogy".

== Professional Development Training ==
=== Pre Service Training ===
In 2004, the KTWG founded the Karen Teacher Training College in Mu Traw The school runs a two-year course in teaching following a locally designed curriculum.

=== In Service Training ===
Mobile Teacher Trainers (MTT) are who conducting in service training as part of a program that began in 2001. MTT's travel, often to remote areas, to observe and support active teachers. Trainers also work with the local communities, working with local parents and community members to promote the value of education and to engage people in wider policy discussions As of 2017, there are 66 teacher trainers working with KTWG.

=== Summer Vacation Training ===
Teacher trainers conduct teacher trainer for four weeks during the summer school break. In 2015, 1474 teachers completed this training.

== Financial Support ==
KTWG provides stipends. to over 6000 active teachers each year

== Partners and Affiliated groups ==
KTWG is a founding member of The Myanmar/Burma Indigenous Network for Education (MINE) an advocacy group for Language rights in Myanmar KTWG is a partner of the Karen Department of Health and Welfare. KTWG receives financial and technical support from WorldEd KTWG has partnered with Naresuan University with the university which provided training and certification for KTWG teachers

The Karen State Education Assistance Group (KSEAG) was formed in 2005 by KTWG in partnership with the Karen Education Department. It provides teacher stipends and educational material to schools in Eastern Myanmar. According to KTWG, In 2013/14 KSEAG supported 6154 teachers, 141,632 students and 1294 schools.

In 2014, KTWG and Karen News produced the film "Our Schools, Our Language and Our Future", which was launched in Yangon. The organisation has received support from Save the Children for the MTTs to use Save the Children's Quality Learning Environment evaluative tool in the field.
