= Karen Baptist Convention =

Kayin Baptist Convention

- Classification: Evangelical Christianity
- Theology: Baptist
- Associations: Myanmar Baptist Convention
- Headquarters: Yangon, Myanmar
- Origin: 1913
- Congregations: 1,906
- Members: 319,070
- Official website: kbcm1913.org

Karen Baptist Convention is a Baptist Christian denomination in Myanmar. The headquarters is in Yangon. It is affiliated with the Myanmar Baptist Convention. Leaderships in the organization are for a three-year term and can only be re-elected for two more terms if they do not reach the age of 60 years at the end of next three-year term. It has 20 associations. KBC is doing mission works not only in Karen people but also to other tribes and races. KBC maintains one press called the Go Forward Press. KBC also operates [Karen Baptist Theological Seminary] and Karen Baptist Convention's Hospital at Insein, Yangon.

== History ==
The first Karen convert was reputed to be Hpu Tha Byu, converted through the efforts of the three missionary pioneers to the Karen, George Boardman and his wife, Sarah, and Adoniram Judson. A freed slave, Ko Tha Byu, was an illiterate, surly man who spoke almost no Burmese. Tha Byu killed at least thirty Burmese robbers and thieves those who tortured his parents and his villagers when he was teen. Tha Byu was a great boxer when he was young. His whole life career was boxing until he got old and lost the fight then was enslaved by his opponent and got sold to a Burmese man Maung Shwe Bay. Maung Shwe Bay’s wife asked Tha Byu to do every single house-whole chores because of that Tha Byu threaten to kill them both. Maung Shwe Bay got scared and sold Tha Byu to Adoniram Judson, Tha Byu was in his late fifties during this time. After his conversion he was wonderfully changed, and became an energetic missionary to the Karen people.

While the Boardmans and Ko Tha Byu were penetrating the jungles to the south, Adoniram Judson shook off a paralyzing year-long siege of depression that overcame him after the death of his wife, Ann, and set out alone on long canoe trips up the Salween River into the tiger-infested jungles to evangelize the northern Karen. Between trips he worked untiringly at his lifelong goal of translating the whole Bible into the Burmese language. When he finished it at last in 1834, he had been labouring on it for twenty-four years. It was printed and published in 1835.

A second single woman, Eleanor Macomber, after five years of mission to the Ojibway Indians in Michigan, joined the mission in Burma in 1835. Alone, with the help of Karen evangelistic assistants, she planted a church in a remote Karen village and nurtured it to the point where it could be placed under the care of an ordinary missionary. She lived five years and died of jungle fever.

In this period in the middle of the century the name of Saw (or Thra) Quala stands out. A Karen, he was the Baptists' second convert after Ko Tha Byu, the "apostle to the Karens". When Francis Mason, linguist and pioneer to the "heartland" of the Karen tribes, was forced home by ill health in 1857, he decided to turn over the district to his ablest helper, Saw Quala, in whom he had developed the utmost confidence. In the Karen, Saw, he astutely discerned a leader for a second stage of Christian outreach in Burma. Within two years of the time that Mason turned the district over to him, Saw Quala had increased the number of assistants working with him from 3 to 11; they had established 27 new churches; and had baptized 1,880 adult converts. Dr. Mason also pioneered in answering the convention's second call – a request for a more usable translation of the Bible. Not only did Mason encourage the use of Karen evangelists, he, along with Jonathan Wade, made the significant decision to promote a version of the Bible in the Karen language to supplement what was already being done with the Bible in the national language, Burmese. The story is told that in 1831 on his first trip into Karen territory, an old man confronted him. "Where is our book?" he asked, referring to the Karen legend mentioned before. "If you bring us our lost book, we will welcome you." Wade was quick to respond. It is said that he reduced the Karen language to writing even before he could speak it, and Dr. Mason took Wade's adaptation of the Burmese alphabet to Karen sounds and threw himself into the arduous task of translating the Bible into Sgaw Karen. Thus did the Karens receive "their Book". The first printed portion was the Sermon on the Mount in 1837; the New Testament appeared in successive printing stages from 1843 to 1861, and the Old Testament in 1863.

Karen Baptist Convention was founded in 1913.

== Publication ==
- Go Forward Magazine
- Sunday School Lesson for different ages
- Htee Moo Htaw Beh Magazine
- Klet Ser Magazine
- Topics for weekly Women’s Worship Service
- Topics for weekly Youth Worship Service
- Concordance in Karen Language

== Departments of Karen Baptist Convention ==
1. Finance and Property Department 2. Department for Youth Works 3. Women's Department 4. Christian Education Department 5. Ministers' Department 6. Publication Department 7. Communication Department 8. Evangelism and Missionary Department 9. Christian Social Service and Development Department 10. Theology Department 11. Care and Counseling Department 12. Literature and Culture Department 13. Leadership Promotion Department 14. Men's Department

== Statistics ==
According to a census published by the association in 2023, it claimed 1,906 churches and 319,070 members.

== Members of KBC ==
=== Yangon Region ===
- Yangon Karen Baptist Home Mission Churches Association

=== Mandalay Region, Magwe Region, Sagaine Region Shan State, Kachin State ===
- Upper Myanmar Karen Baptist Association

=== Bago Region ===
- Taungoo Paku Karen Baptist Association
- Tungoo Thandaung Bwe Mobwa Karen Baptist Association
- Taungoo Geh Khoo Geh Bah Karen Baptist Association
- Nyaunglebin Karen Baptist Association
- Shwegyin Kyaukkyi (Hsaw Hti) Karen Baptist Association
- Pyay Tharyarwaddy Karen Baptist Association
- Bago Yangon Karen Baptist Association

=== Ayeyarwady Region ===
- Pathein Myaungmya Karen Baptist Association
- Myaung Mya Karen Baptist Association
- Hinthada Karen Baptist Association

=== Kayah State ===
- Kayah Mobwa Baptist Association
- Kayah Phu Baptist Association

=== Kayin State ===
- Hpa-An Mawlamyaing Karen Baptist Association
- Hpa-Pun (Mutraw) Karen Baptist Association
- Kyar Inn Karen Baptist Association

=== Tanintharyi Region ===
- Dawei Myeik Karen Baptist Association
- Myeik Karen Baptist Association

=== Mon State ===
- (Covered by Hpaan Mawlamyine Karen Baptist Association)

=== Rakhine State ===
- Mro Baptist Association

== Foreign Countries ==
- Thailand Karen Baptist Convention (TKBC)
- Kawthulay Karen Baptist Churches (KKBC)
- Singapore Karen Baptist Church
- Malaysia Karen Baptist Church
- Chiang Mai, Thailand Karen Baptist Church
- Bangkok Karen Baptist Church
- Karen Baptist Churches USA (KBC-USA)
- Australia Karen Baptist Churches
- KBN (Karen Baptist in Norway)
- KBC (Karen Baptisth IN Canada)

== See also ==
- Myanmar Baptist Convention
- Karen Baptist Missionary Society
- Karen Baptist Theological Seminary
