= Tha Byu =

Burmese evangelist to the Karen (c. 1778–1840)

Tha Byu (c.1778 – 9 September 1840) was the first Karen Christian and a notable evangelist to the Karen.

== Biography ==
Tha Byu was born in U Twa village. In his early life, he reportedly engaged in robbery and was involved in numerous murders. After being sold into slavery to a Christian Burmese, he was converted to Baptist Christianity by Adoniram Judson in 1828. Judson referred to him as Tha Byu ("younger brother") from their first encounter. Judson recalled that Tha Byu was a vicious and angry person at the time, which Tha Byu later confirmed. However, following his conversion, Tha Byu became an energetic missionary to the Karen people. Within twelve years, 1,270 Karen individuals had been baptized, along with many other believers.
