= Karen Baptist Theological Seminary =

Seminary in Yangon, Myanmar

Coordinates: 16°52′55.9″N 96°06′43.3″E

- Type: Private
- Established: 1845; 181 years ago
- Affiliations: Karen Baptist Convention
- Location: Insein, Yangon Division, Myanmar

The Karen Baptist Theological Seminary (S'gaw Karen: ပှၤကညီဘျၢထံယွၤဂ့ၢ်ပီညါဖၠၣ်စိမိၤ) is a Baptist theological institute in Seminary Hill, Insein, Yangon, Myanmar. It is affiliated with the Karen Baptist Convention.

== History ==
The school was founded in 1845 by the American Baptist Missionary Union. The seminary's academic courses are taught primarily in the S'gaw Karen language, with English being used for administrative purposes. The Burmese language is not used.
