= List of high schools in Taungoo =

This is the list of Basic Education High Schools in Taungoo, in the Bago Region of Myanmar.

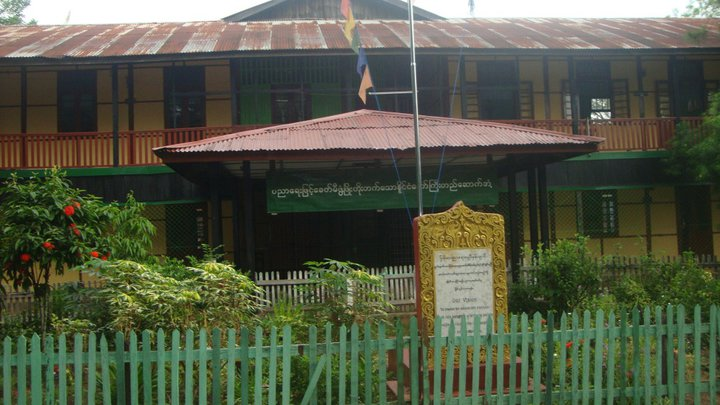
No.5 State High School, Taungoo

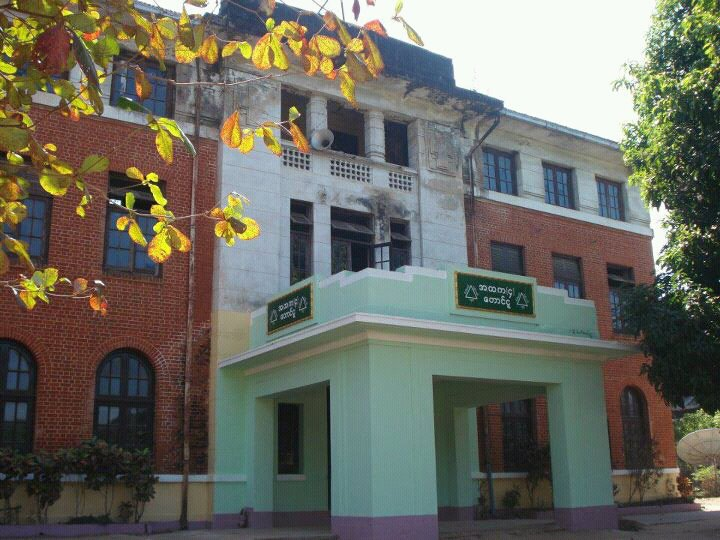
BEHS 4 Taungoo

1. BEHS 1 Taungoo: Formerly, National High School. Government owned High School.
2. BEHS 2 Taungoo Formerly, National High School. Government owned High School.
3. BEHS 3 Taungoo:Formerly, Convent School run by Roman Catholic Diocese, now become Taungoo Educational College
4. BEHS 4 Taungoo: Formerly, St. Luke's High School run by the Taungoo Anglican Diocese. Nationalized in April 1965
5. BEHS 5 Taungoo: Formerly, Paku High School under the Paku Karen Baptist Association (American Baptist Mission). Nationalized in April 1965
6. BEHS 6 Taungoo: Formerly, Bunker High School under the Bwe Karen Baptist Association. Nationalized in April 1965
7. BEHS Natsingon: High school for children of military families. The principal is a military officer.
8. BEHS 7 (Also known as Chinese Temple High School): became a Middle School in 1965 became a high(branch) school in 2014-2015 became a high school in 2015–2016.
9. THS Toungoo (Technological High School (Toungoo)) .
10. BEHS 4Miles
11. BEHS Kaytumadi (Myothit)
