= Paku =

Paku may refer to:

== Languages ==
- Paku language (also known as Karen), spoken by the Sgaw Karen people of Myanmar and Thailand
- Paku language (Indonesia), an endangered language of Borneo

== People ==
- Paku Alam, a series of Kings of Pakualam Principality in Indonesia
- Teja Paku Alam (born 1994), Indonesian footballer
- Shannon Paku (born 1980), New Zealand rugby player

== Places ==
- Lubuk Paku, in Malaysia
- Paku Alaman, in Indonesia
- Ulu Paku, in Malaysia

== Other ==
- PAKU, ICAO airport code for Ugnu–Kuparuk Airport in Alaska, United States
- Paku Divinity School, in Myanmar
- Paku Karen Baptist Association, in Myanmar

== See also ==
- Pacu (disambiguation)
- Pakupaku, a microfossil
