= Myanmar Air Force =

Aerial branch of Myanmar's armed forces

Defence Services (Air)
- Tatmadaw (Lay) တပ်မတော် (လေ) (Burmese)
- Emblem ; Shoulder sleeve
- Founded: 15 January 1947; 79 years ago
- Country: Myanmar
- Type: Air force
- Size: 25,000 personnel; 356 aircraft
- Part of: Tatmadaw
- Anniversaries: 15 December 1947
- Engagements: Internal conflict in Myanmar

Commanders
- Commander-in-Chief (Air): Lt Gen Tun Win

Insignia
- Roundel

- Fin flash

- Ensign

Aircraft flown
- Attack: A-5C, FTC-2000G, CH-3A, CH-4
- Fighter: MiG-29SM/USM, Su-30SME, JF-17 Thunder
- Helicopter: Mi-2, Mi-17, Mi-38, Ka-28, UH-1, Bell 206, Alouette III, W-3
- Attack helicopter: Mi-35P
- Trainer helicopter: EC120, H125
- Interceptor: F-7IIK
- Patrol: BN-2
- Reconnaissance: DART-450, MTX-1
- Trainer: Yak-130, K-8W, FT-7, G-4, G 120TP, HJT-16, PC-7, PC-9
- Transport: Y-8, Y-12, Beechcraft 1900, ATR 42, ATR 72, Fokker 70, PC-6

The Myanmar Air Force, officially the Defence Services (Air) (Burmese: တပ်မတော် (လေ), romanised: Tatmadaw (Lay), pronounced [taʔmədɔ̀ (le)]), is the aerial branch of the Myanmar Defence Services (Tatmadaw), the combined military of Myanmar. Its official name was Burma Air Force (Burmese: မြန်မာ့လေတပ်မတော်, romanized: Myanma Lay Tatmadaw) before being renamed to Defence Services (Air Force) (Burmese: တပ်မတော် (လေတပ်), romanized: Tatmadaw (Lay Tat)) in 1956. The primary mission of the Myanmar Air Force (MAF) since its inception has been to provide air bases force protection, anti-aircraft warfare, close air support (CAS), logistical, and transport to the Myanmar Army in counterinsurgency operations. It is mainly used in internal conflicts in Myanmar, and, on a smaller scale, in relief missions, especially after the deadly Cyclone Nargis of May 2008.

== History ==
=== Post-independence era (1948–1990) ===
The Myanmar Air Force (MAF) was formed as the Burmese Air Force on 16 January 1947, while Burma (as Myanmar was known until 1989) was still under British rule. By 1948, the fleet of the new air force included 40 Airspeed Oxfords, 16 de Havilland Tiger Moths, four Austers, and three Supermarine Spitfires transferred from the Royal Air Force, and had a few hundred personnel.

The Mingaladon Air Base HQ, the main air base in the country, was formed on 16 June 1950. No.1 Squadron, Equipment Holding Unit and Air High Command - Burma Air Force, and the Flying Training School, were placed under the jurisdiction of the base. A few months later, on 18 December 1950, No. 2 Squadron was formed with nine Douglas Dakotas as a transport squadron. In 1953, the Advanced Flying Unit was formed under the Mingaladon Air Base with de Havilland Vampire T55s, and by the end of 1953 the Burmese Air Force had three main airbases, at Mingaladon, Hmawbi, and Meiktila, in central Burma.

In 1953, the Burmese Air Force bought 30 Supermarine Spitfires from Israel and 20 Supermarine Seafires from the United Kingdom, and in 1954 it bought 40 Percival Provost T-53s and 8 de Havilland Vampire Mark T55s from the United Kingdom. In late 1955, the Burmese Air Force formed a Maintenance Air Base in Mingaladon, No. 501 Squadron Group (Hmawbi Airbase) and No. 502 Squadron Group (Mingaladon Air Base). In 1956, the Burmese Air Force bought 10 Cessna 180 aircraft from the United States. The same year, 6 Kawasaki Bell 47Gs formed its first helicopter unit. The following year, the Burmese Air Force procured 21 Hawker Sea Fury aircraft from the United Kingdom and 9 de Havilland Canada DHC-3 Otters from Canada. In 1958, it procured 7 additional Kawasaki Bell 47Gs and 12 Vertol H-21 Shawnees from the United States. Five years later, No. 503 Squadron Group was formed with No. 51 Squadron (de Havilland Canada DHC-3 Otters and Cessna 180s) and No. 53 Squadron (Bell 47Gs, Kaman HH-43 Huskies, and Aérospatiale Alouettes) in Meiktila.

On 15 February 1961, an unmarked Republic of China Air Force Consolidated PB4Y Privateer came into Burmese air space carrying supplies for Chinese Kuomintang forces fighting in northern Burma, and was intercepted by three Hawker Sea Fury fighters of the Burmese Air Force. The intruding bomber and one Burmese fighter crashed in Thailand during the incident. On 17 February, a team from Burmese 9th Front Brigade left for the crash site. A 12.7mm bullet was fired into the fuselage of UB-466, hitting pilot officer Peter as well, breaking five of his ribs. Peter was recorded in the history of Burmese Air Force as an airman who gave his life for the country and the people. In 1962, a new radar station in Mingaladon and a mobile radar station in Lwemwe (near Tachileik) were put into operation. By December 1964, the Burmese Air Force had 323 officers and 5,677 other ranks and it acquired Lockheed T-33 Shooting Star jet trainers and a new radar station, which could operate within a 120-mile (193-km) radius, was opened in Namsang. In 1966, the radar arm of the air force underwent a complete overhaul and upgrade, with new radar stations being operated. The Namsang Radar station was upgraded to cover about a 200-mile (322-km) radius and renamed No.71 Squadron. In the same year, the Burmese Air Force formed the No. 1 Airborne Battalion with 26 officers and 750 other ranks.

On 1 January 1967, the Burmese Air Force reorganised its command structure. No. 501 Squadron Group in Hmawbi became No. 501 Air Base HQ; No. 502 Squadron Group in Mingalardon became No. 502 Air Base HQ; and No. 503 Squadron Group in Meiktila became No. 503 Air Base HQ in Meiktila. It also maintained airfield detachments in Lashio and Kengtung to cope with the insurgency of Communist Party of Burma in the northeast border region of the country.

In 1975, the Burmese Air Force took delivery of 18 Bell 205A and seven Bell 206B helicopters from the United States under the International Narcotic Control Program (INCP). In March 1975, it bought 20 SIAI-Marchetti SF.260 trainers from Italy.

Between 1976 and 1987, the Burmese Air Force bought seven Pilatus PC-6 Turbo porter STOL aircraft; and 16 Pilatus PC-7 and 10 Pilatus PC-9 turboprop trainers from Switzerland. These aircraft were deployed in Lashio for close air support in counter-insurgency operations.

In 1989, the Burmese Air Force was renamed the Myanmar Air Force in accordance with the country changing its name from Burma to Myanmar.

=== Modernisation Programme (1990–present) ===
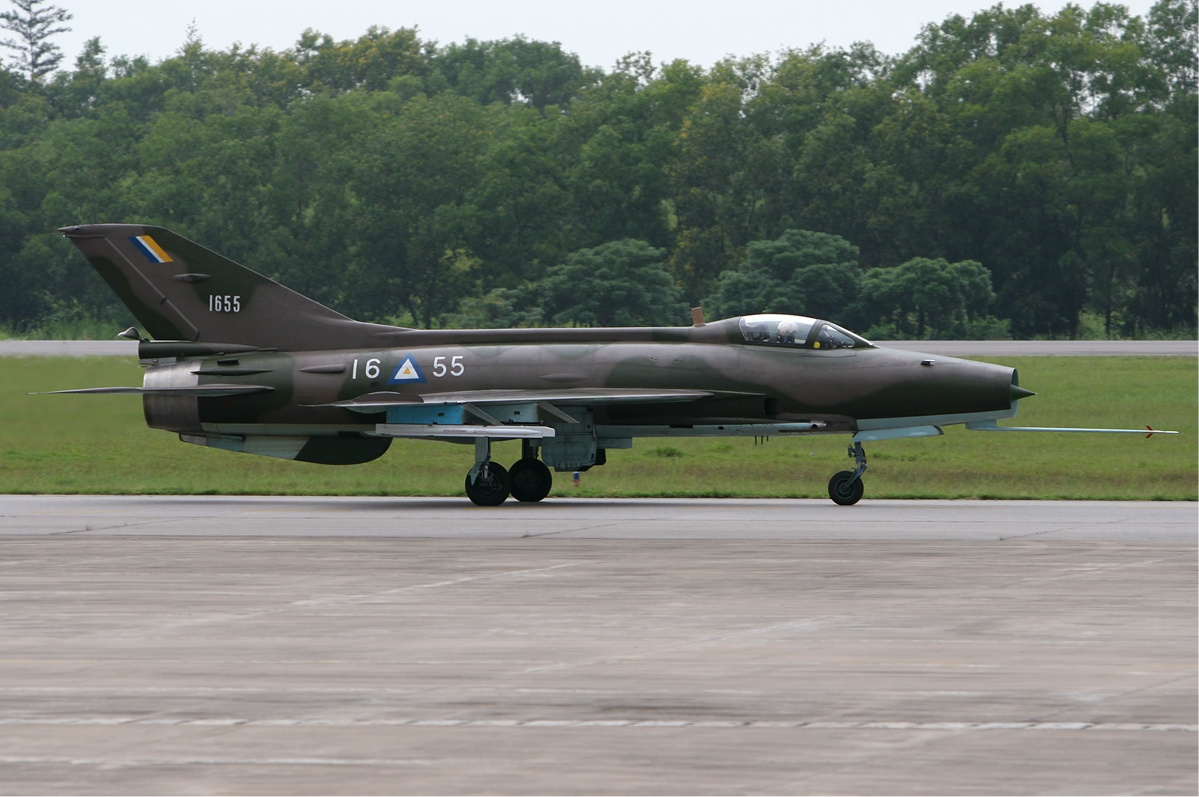
Myanmar Air Force Chengdu F-7M

In the early 1990s, the Burmese Air Force upgraded its facilities and introduced two new air base headquarters and existing air base headquarters were renamed. It also significantly upgraded its radar and electronic warfare facilities. The Burmese Air Force bought more than 100 aircraft from the People's Republic of China, which included F7 IIK interceptors, FT-7 trainers, A-5C ground attack aircraft, FT-6M trainers, K-8 trainers and Y-8 transport aircraft.

By 2000, the Myanmar Air Force had received 62 F7 IIK interceptors from China. Assistance from Israel was sought to refurbish and upgrade all operational F-7s and FT-7s: these were to get the Elta EL/M-2032 air-to-air radar, Rafael Python Mk. III and even Litening laser-designator pods. The same equipment was then installed on the two-seater FT-7 fighter trainers as well. In a related deal, Israel transferred at least one consignment of laser-guided bombs, but no deliveries of any other weapons are known. Since the Elbit contract was won in 1997, the air force had acquired at least one more squadron of F-7 and FT-7 aircraft from China, but these were not upgraded.

Between 1992 and 2000, the Myanmar Air Force took delivery of 36 A-5C ground attack aircraft. In addition, the Myanmar Air Force also bought 20 Soko G-4 Super Galeb armed jet trainers from Yugoslavia in 1991, but only approximately 6 aircraft were delivered due to the breakup of Yugoslavia.

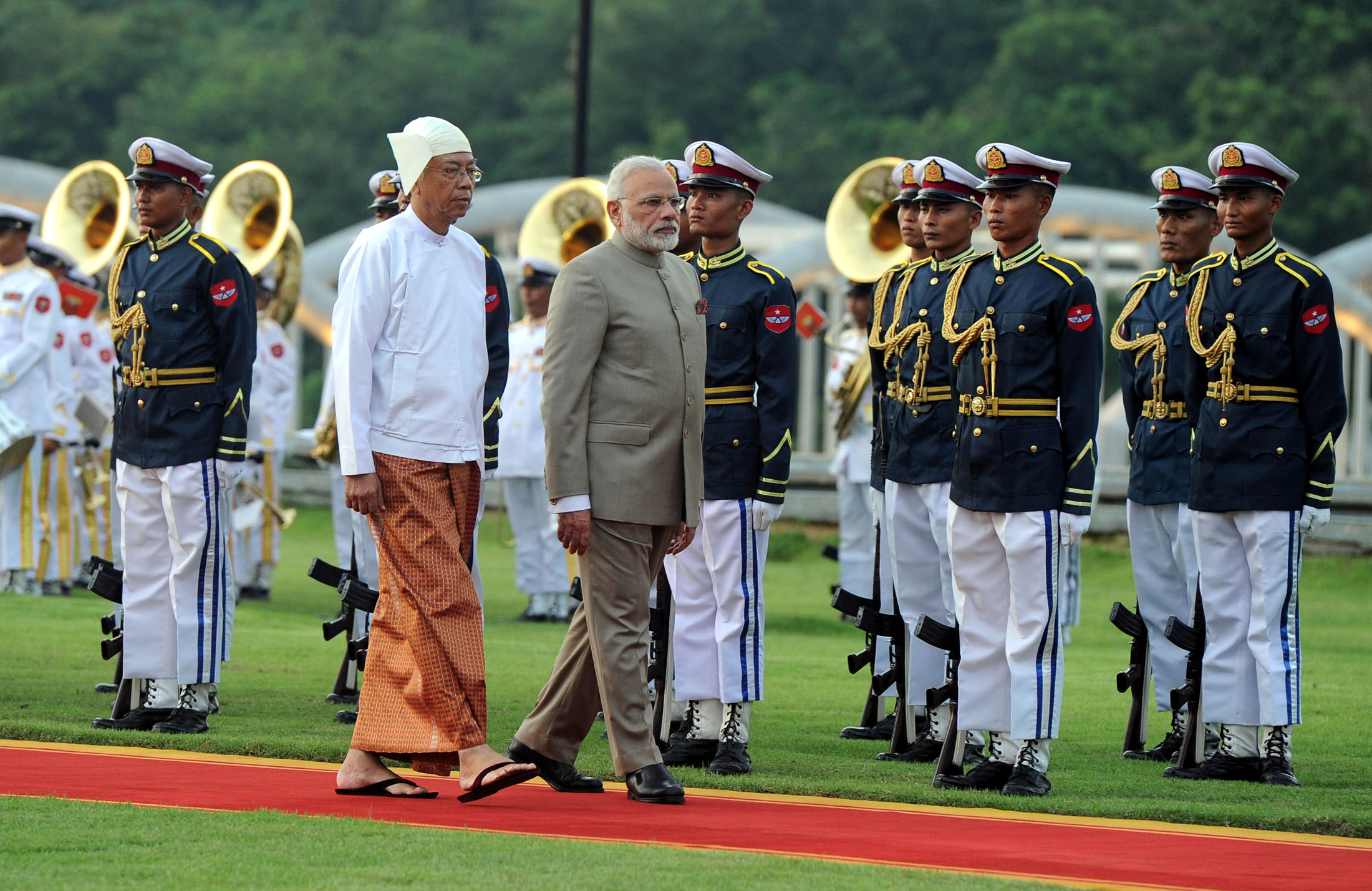
President Htin Kyaw and Indian Prime Minister Narendra Modi, pass in front of the MAF Honour Guards during an arrival ceremony at the Presidential Palace, Naypyidaw in 2017.

The Myanmar Air Force procured a range of helicopters from Russia and Poland between 1991 and 1997; it bought 20 PZL-Swidnik Mil Mi-2 and 13 PZL W-3 Sokol helicopters from Poland and 13 Mil Mi-17 from Russia. These helicopters were put into counter-insurgency operations against ethnic rebels in the Irrawaddy River delta. Four Mil Mi-2, four PZL W-3 Sokol, and two Bell 205 helicopters were grouped as an air detachment stationed in Bogalay for "Operation Monediang" in October 1991. During this operation, Mil Mi-2 helicopters were fitted with a wide range of weapons to provide ground attack and air cover for heliborne air assault operations. Four Mi-2s of the air detachment made a total of 80 sorties over 17 targets with nearly 82 flying hours. Four PZL W-3 Sokol helicopters, unarmed and used for troop transport carrying 20 airborne commandos, each flew 443 missions with 197 flying hours. Bell 205 helicopters carried out search and rescue, and they flew 263 missions with over 114 flying hours.

In 2001, the Myanmar Air Force bought 12 MiG-29 fighter aircraft (10 MiG-29Bs and two MiG-29UB two seats trainers) from Belarus. This was followed by an additional order of 20 MiG-29 (10 MiG-29B, 6 MiG-29SE and 4 MiG-29UB) as part of a $570 million defence package in December 2009. 10 MiG-29B were upgraded to SM (mod) standard in 2017. The air force also ordered 10 Mil Mi-35 gunship helicopters as part of a $71 million defence package signed in December 2009.

Despite these modernisation measures, the capability of the Myanmar Air Force remained questionable, due to its absence during the Battle of Border Post 9631 with Thailand and the rescue missions related to Cyclone Nargis in May 2008.

A contract had been signed in December 2015 with Pakistan for the purchase of JF-17 Thunder multirole fighter, which was jointly developed by Chengdu Aircraft Industry Group and Pakistan Aeronautical Complex, to Myanmar Air Force. However, in March 2018 it was reported that the deal for the purchase of JF-17 Thunder has been suspended by Pakistan. However, four JF-17 Block-IIs were seen at Air Force Day celebrated in December 2018. Under a bilateral contract, the MAF ordered six Su-30SM fighters from Russia in 2018. Six HAL HJT-16 Kiran trainers were delivered as a gift from ex-Indian Airforce stocks partly to counter Chinese clout and partly as reciprocity for co-operation from the Tatmadaw in Indian Operation against Naga insurgents.

=== Myanmar civil war (2021-present) ===
Since the military coup in February 2021, Myanmar Air Force aircraft have been used in airstrikes on villages, killing noncombatant civilians including elders, humanitarian workers and children while forcing thousands of others to flee their homes.

On 11 April 2023, the Myanmar air force conducted a relentless airstrike on Pazigyi village in Kantbalu Township, Sagaing Region, killing at least 100 people, including children. This was the junta's deadliest airstrike after the coup. The attack targeted an opening ceremony of a local administration office. The junta spokesperson reasoned that high casualties were due to the secondary explosion of munitions stored in the area. However, ground sources confirmed that most of the casualties are civilians, including children. The airstrike was conducted by a fighter jet and later by a Mi-35 gunship.

On the morning of January 7, 2024, the Myanmar Air Force conducted an airstrike on Kanan village, Tamu Township, Sagaing Region, hitting a civilian area, with bombs landing near St Peter Baptist Church and a nearby school compound while residents were gathered for Sunday service. The strike killed at least 17 civilians, including nine children, and injured over 20 people.

On 12 May 2025, Myanmar air force carried out an airstrike on Ohe Htein Twin village in Tabayin Township, Sagaing Region, that struck a school building. According to local resistance members, aid workers, and media reports, the attack killed up to 20 students and two teachers, and wounded dozens of other draftees. The incident occurred in the morning and added to the mounting civilian toll of the conflict in central Myanmar.

On 25 August 2025, Myanmar's air force carried out an airstrike on the Daing Kyi quarter of Mrauk-U, a historic town in Rakhine State known for its temples and pagodas. The attack killed at least 12 people, including children, according to the Arakan Army (AA), which has controlled the town since January 2024.

On 12 September 2025, Myanmar's air force conducted an airstrike on a private boarding school in Thayat Tabin village, Kyauktaw Township, Rakhine State. According to local media and residents, two 500-pound bombs struck the Pyinnya Pan Khinn High School and its surroundings at around 1 a.m., killing 22 people, most of them students. Kyauktaw town has been under the control of the Arakan Army since January 2024.

On 10 December 2025 at midnight, Myanmar's air force bombed the Mrauk-U General Hospital, leaving more than 30 deaths and multiple injuries.

On 23 February 2026, a bazaar in Yoe-ngu Village, Ponnagyun Township, was reportedly bombed by Myanmar's Air Force, leaving 15 people dead and several others injured.

== Rank structure ==
Cap badges

Officers

NCOs & ORs

=== Commissioned officer ranks ===
The rank insignia of commissioned officers.

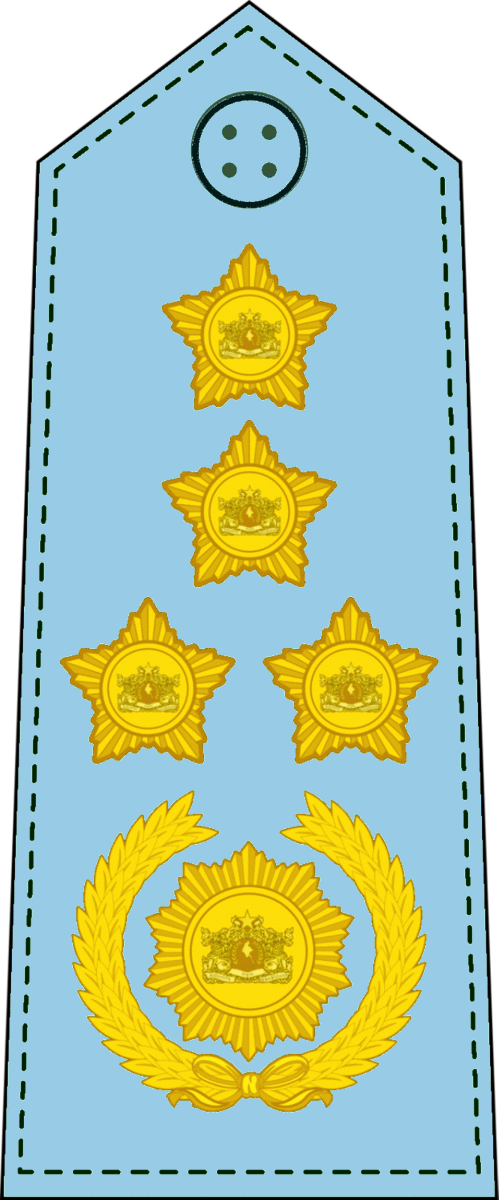
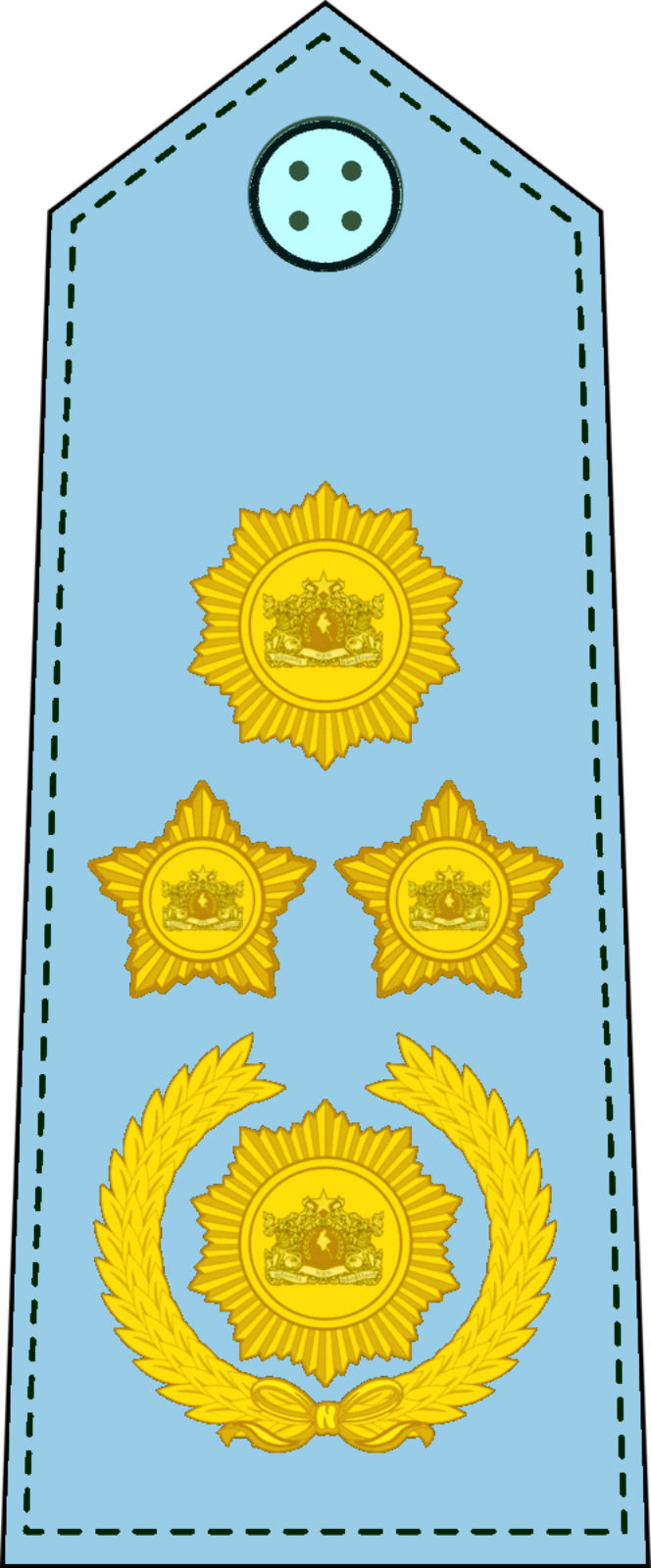
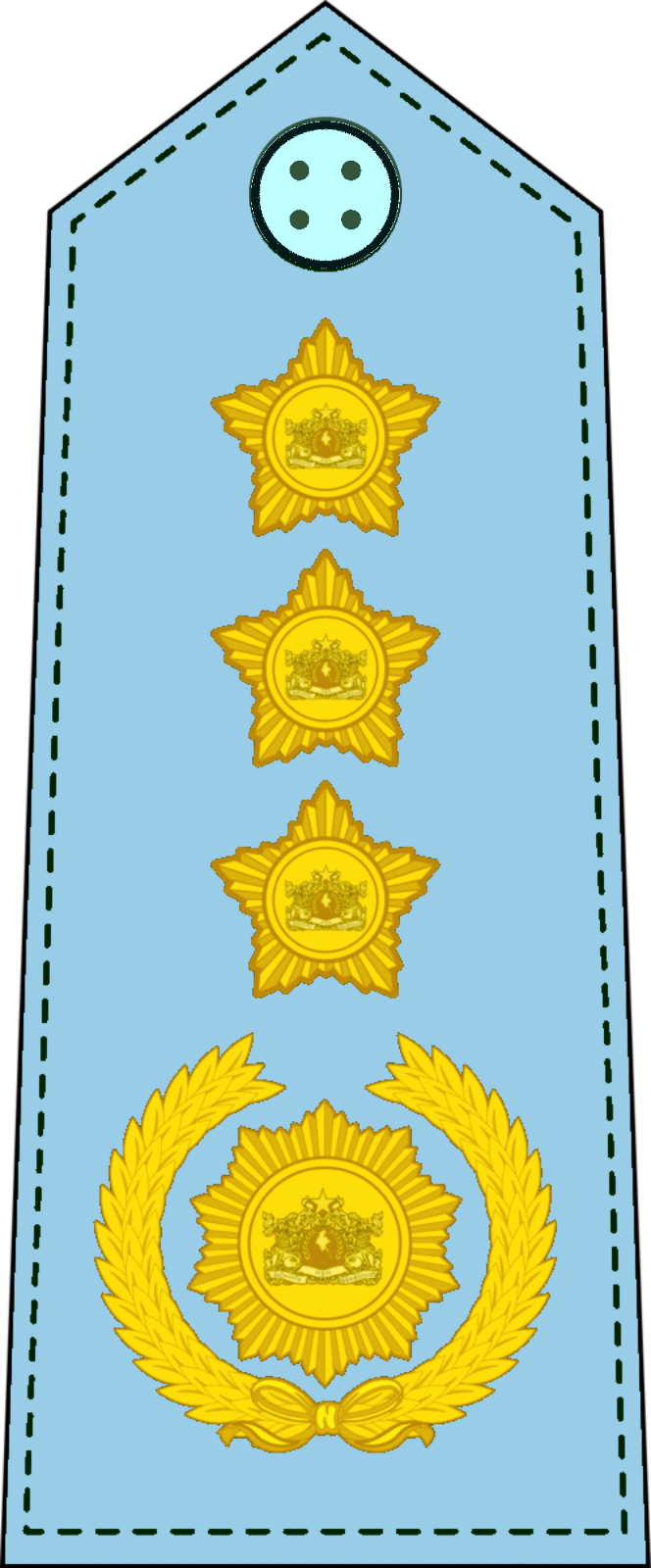
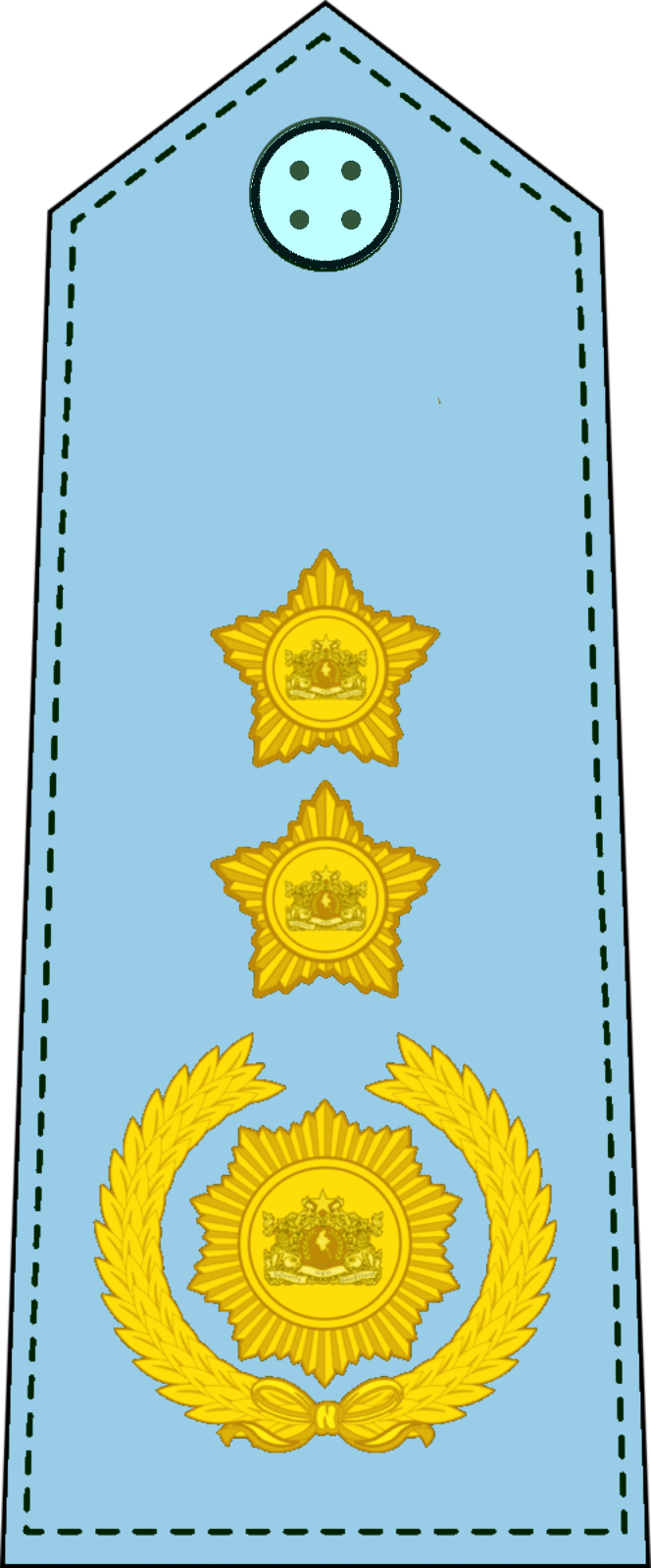
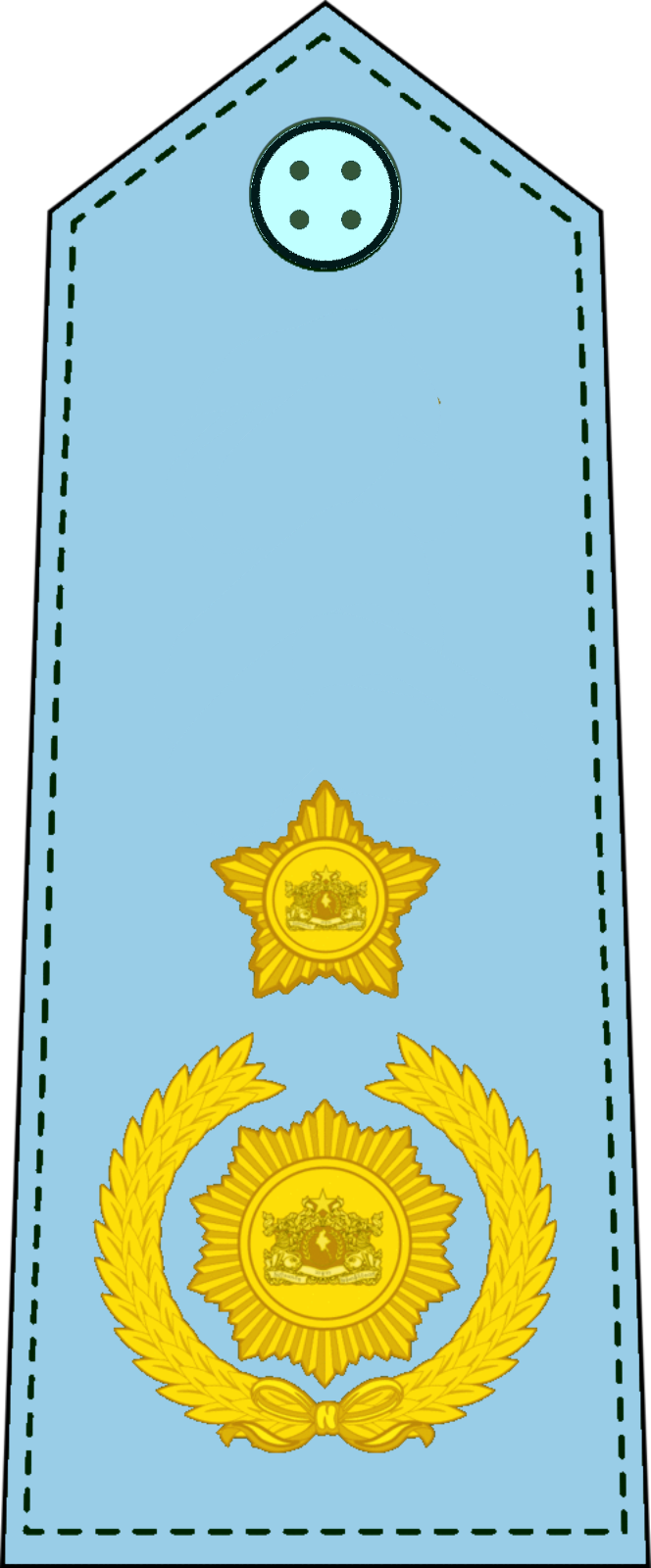
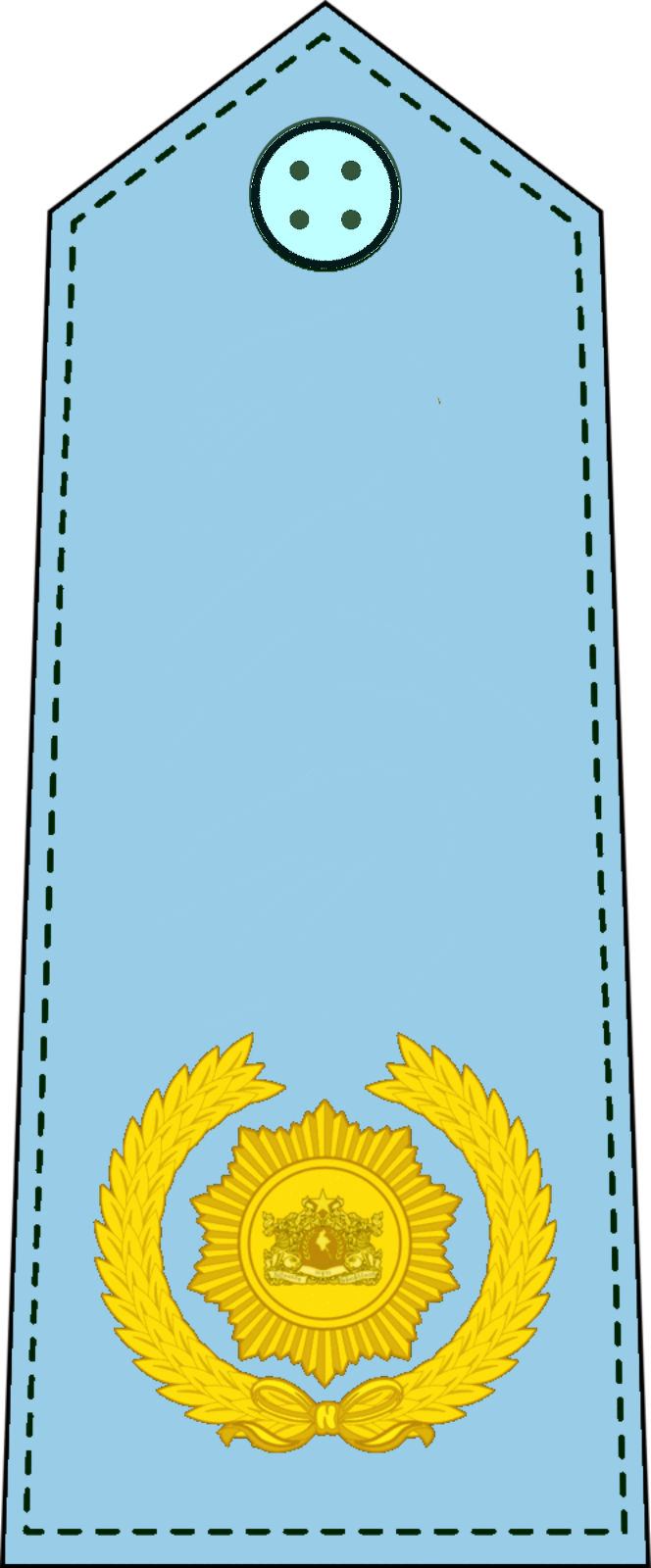
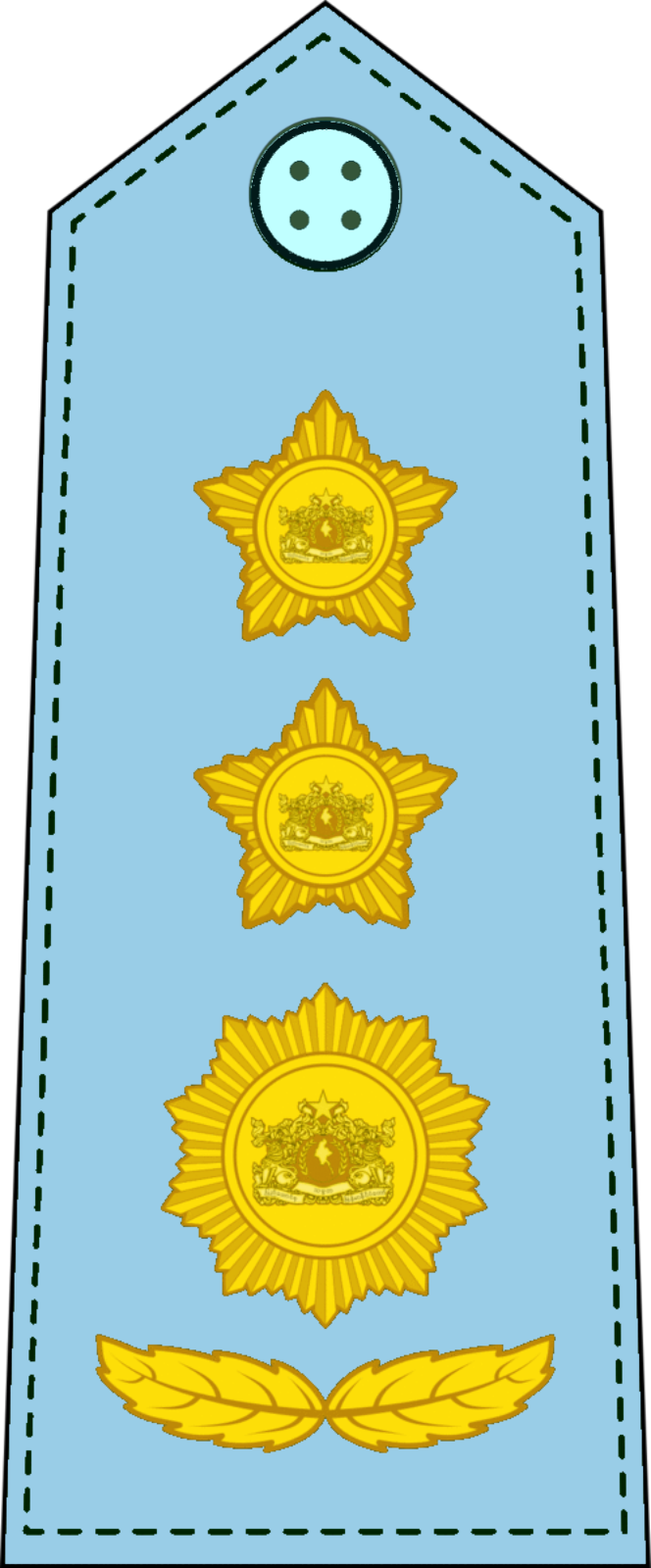
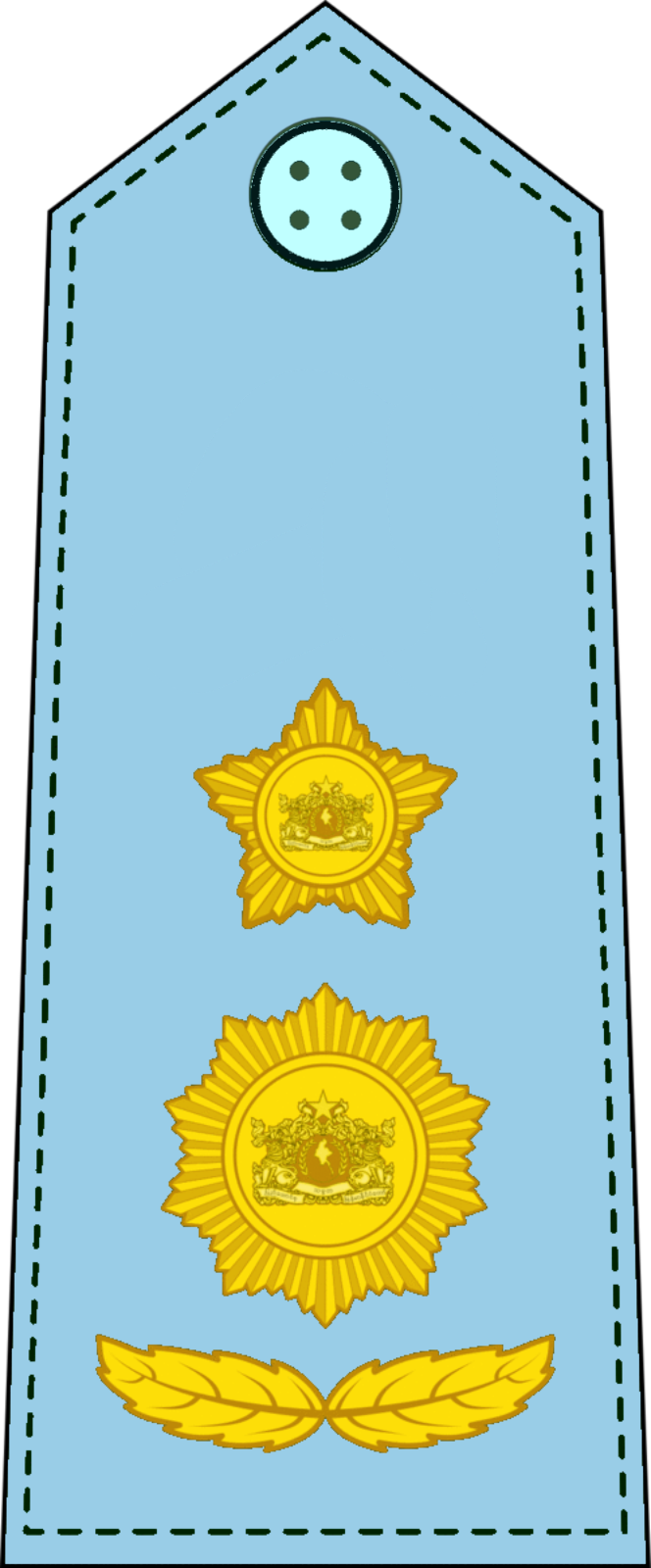
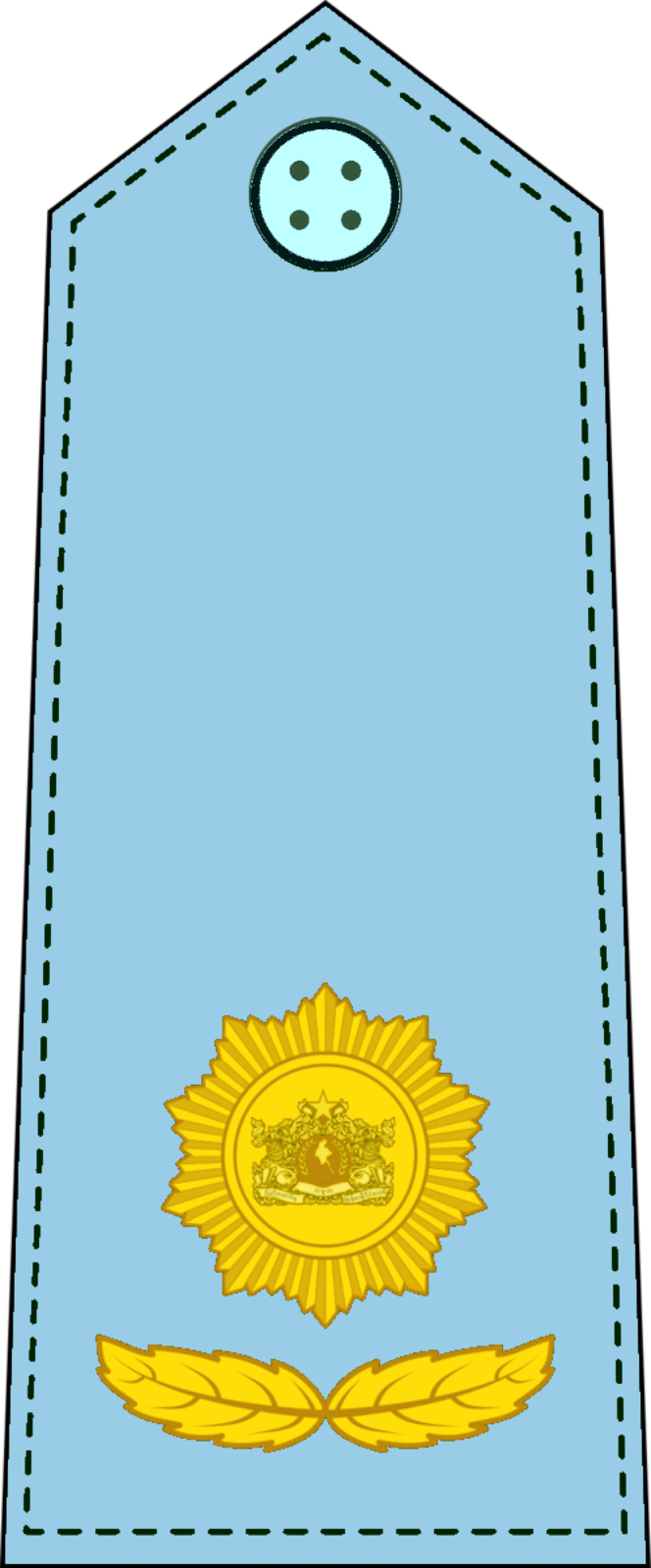
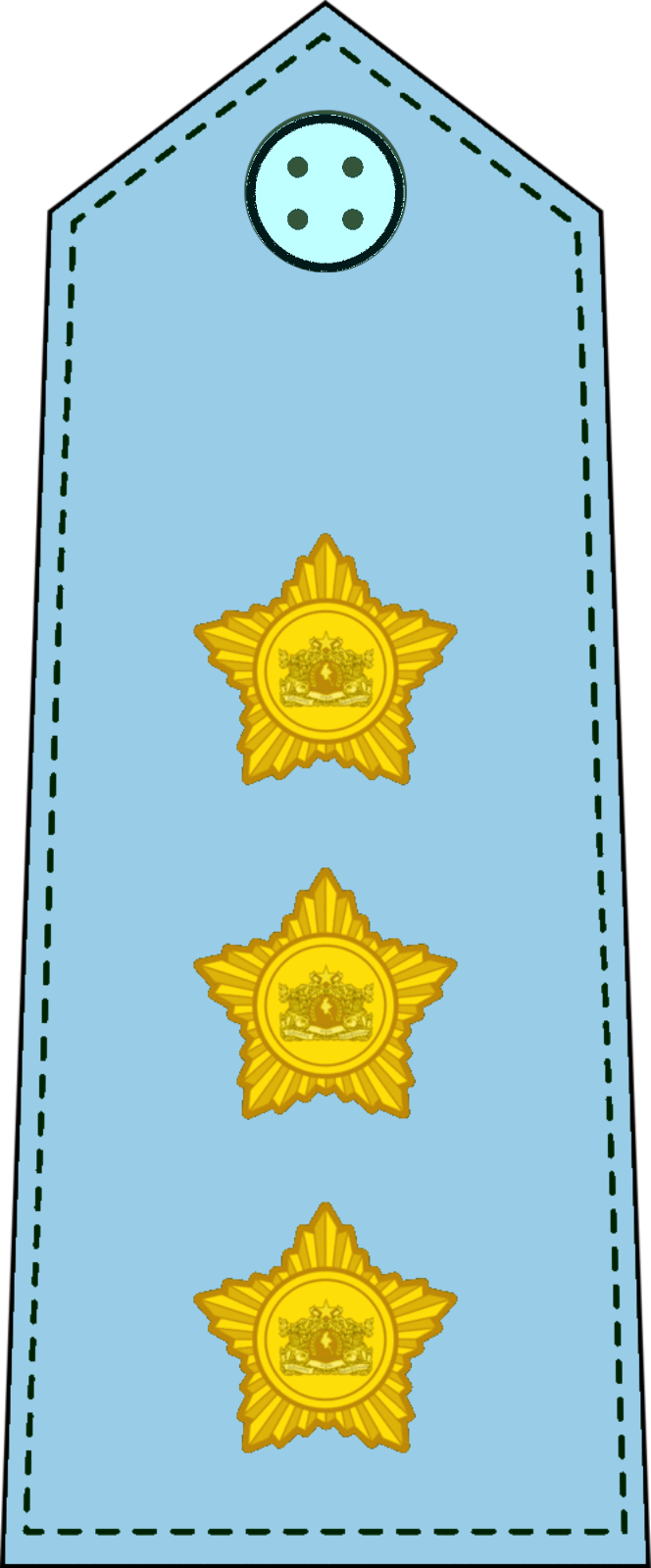
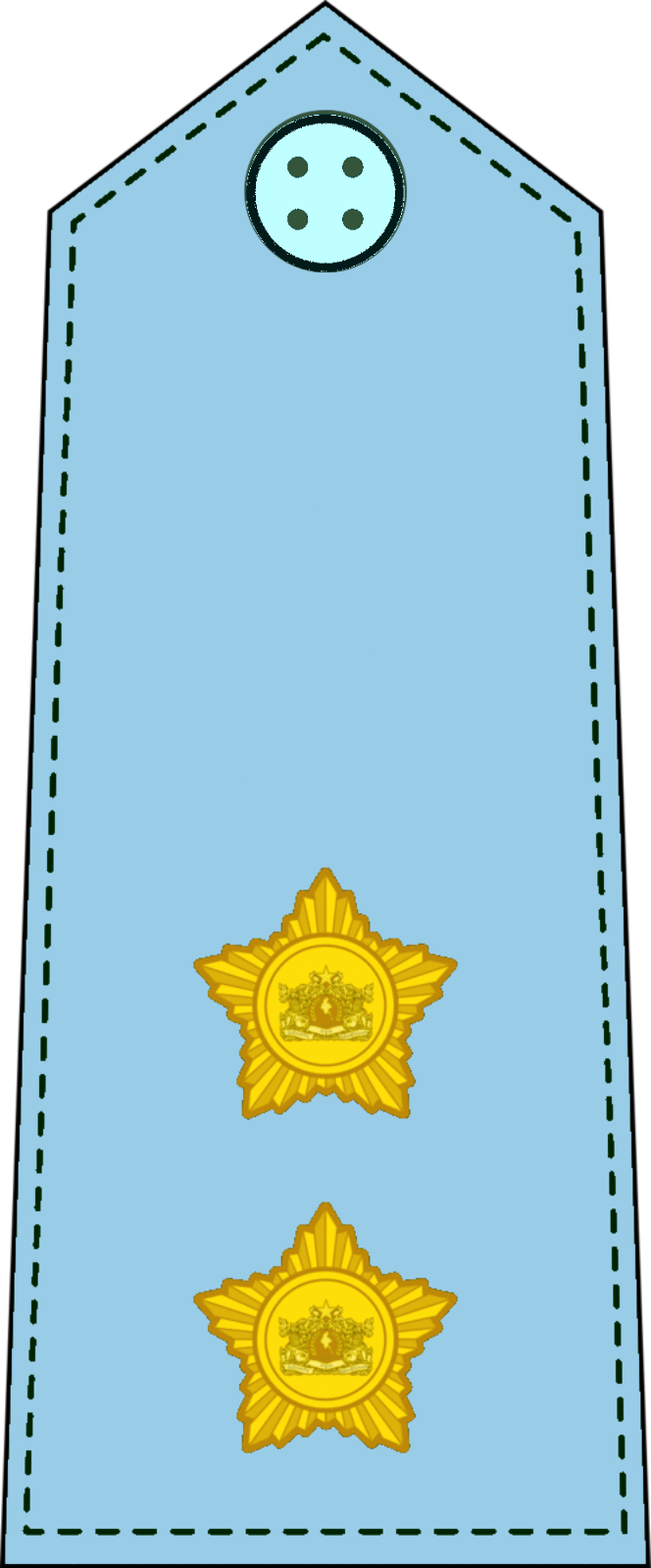
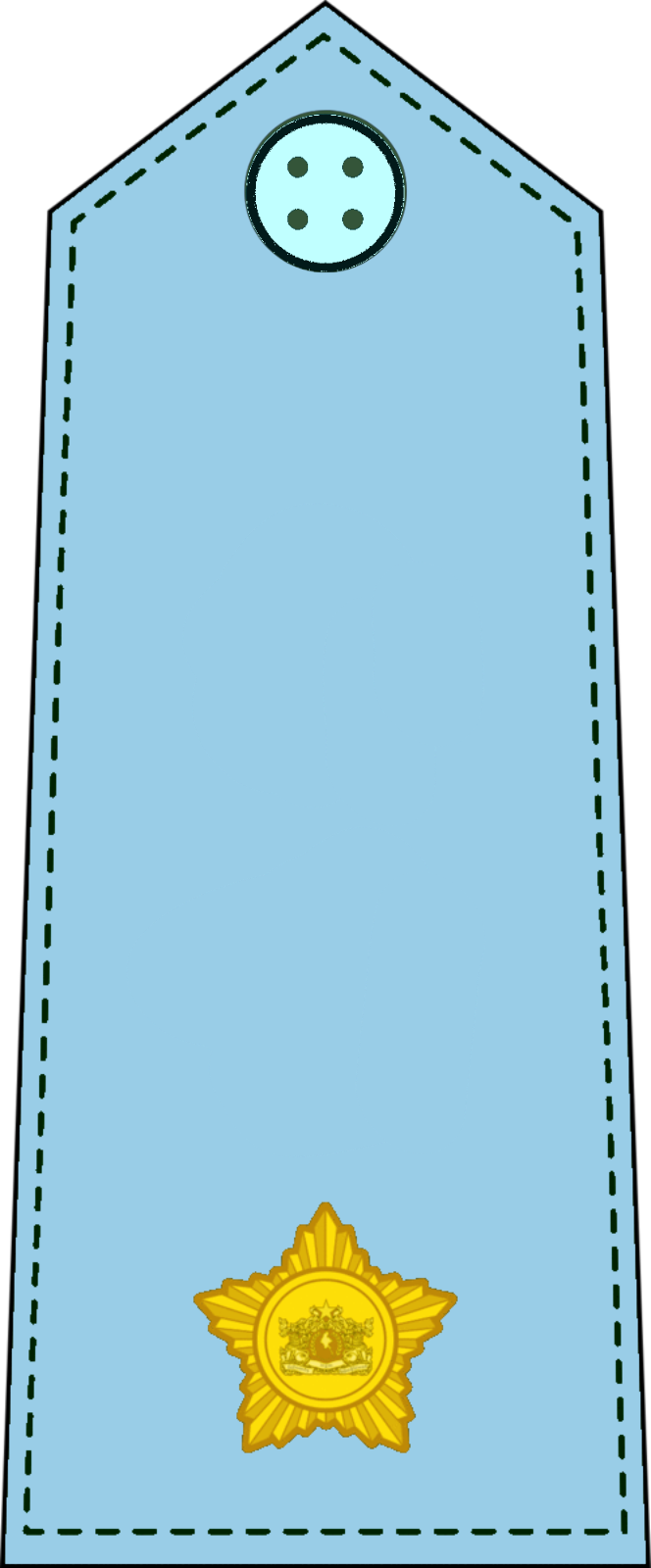
Rank group	General / flag officers						Senior officers			Junior officers
Myanmar Air Force
Myanmar Air Force	ဗိုလ်ချုပ်မှူးကြီး bauilaʻ khayupaʻ mahūʺkarīʺ	ဒုတိယ ဗိုလ်ချုပ်မှူးကြီး dautaiya bauilaʻ khayupaʻ mahūʺkarīʺ	ဗိုလ်ချုပ်ကြီး bauilaʻ khayupaʻ karīʺ	ဒုတိယ ဗိုလ်ချုပ်ကြီး dautaiya bauilaʻ khayupaʻ karīʺ	ဗိုလ်ချုပ် bauilaʻ khayupaʻ	ဗိုလ်မှူးချုပ် bauilaʻ mahūʺkhayupaʻ	ဗိုလ်မှူးကြီး bauilaʻ mahūʺkrīʺ	ဒုတိယ ဗိုလ်မှူးကြီး dautaiya bauilaʻ mahūʺ krīʺ	ဗိုလ်မှူး bauilaʻ mahūʺ	ဗိုလ်ကြီး bauilaʻ krīʺ	ဗိုလ် bauilaʻ	ဒုတိယ ဗိုလ် dautaiya bauilaʻ

=== Other ranks ===
The rank insignia of non-commissioned officers and enlisted personnel.

Rank group	Senior NCOs				Junior NCOs		Enlisted
Myanmar Air Force							No insignia	No insignia
Myanmar Air Force	အရာခံဗိုလ် ’araākhaṃ bauilaʻ	ဒုတိယအရာခံဗိုလ် dautaiya ’araākhaṃ bauilaʻ	အုပ်ခွဲတပ်ကြပ်ကြီး aupaʻ khavai tapaʻ karpaʻ karīʺ	တပ်ကြပ်ကြီး tapaʻ karpaʻ karīʺ	တပ်ကြပ် tapaʻ karpaʻ	ဒုတိယတပ်ကြပ် dautaiya tapaʻ karpaʻ	တပ်သား tapaʻ saāʺ	တပ်သားသစ် tapaʻ saāʺ sacaʻ

== Organisations ==
- Office of the Commander in Chief (Air), Ministry of Defence (Naypyitaw)
- Aircraft Production and Repair Base Headquarters (Meiktila)
- Air Force - Ground Training Base Command (Meiktila)
- Air Force - Fly Training Base Command (Shante)
- No.71 Radar Squadron (Namsam)
- No.72 Radar Squadron (Myeik)
- No.73 Radar Squadron (Myitkyina)
- No.74 Radar Squadron (Hmawbi)
- Eastern Air Command (Namsam)
- Western Air Command (Magway)
- Southern Air Command (Hmawbi)
- Mingalardon Air Force Base Command (Mingalardon)
- Myitkyina Air Force Base Command (Myitkyina)
- Namsam Air Force Base Command (Namsam)
- Taungoo Air Force Base Command (Taungoo)
- Myeik Air Force Base Command (Myeik)
- Magway Air Force Base Command (Magway)
- Homalin Air Force Base Command (Homalin)
- Pathein Air Force Base Command (Pathein)
- Naypyitaw Air Force Base (A lar)
- Hmawbi Air Force Base (Hmawbi)
- Tadaoo Air Force Base (Tadaoo)
- Coco Island Air Force Base (Coco Island)
- Air Force Military Affair Security Unit (Mingalardon)
- No.1 Military Provost Company (Air) (Mingalardon)
- No.2 Military Provost Company (Air) (A lar)
- Air Force Recruitment Unit (Mingalardon)
- Air Force Museum (Mingalardon)

== Air bases ==
- Pathein Air Base HQ
- Hmawbi Air Base HQ (former 501 Air Base)
- Mingaladon Air Base HQ (former 502 Air Base)
- Magway Air Base HQ
- Myitkyina Air Base HQ (former 503 Air Base)
- Myeik Air Base HQ
- Namsang Air Base HQ
- Taungoo Air Base HQ
- Shante Air Base HQ is close to Meikhtila in neighbouring Pyitharyar
- Meiktila Air Base - helicopter training and operations base
- Homemalin Air Base HQ

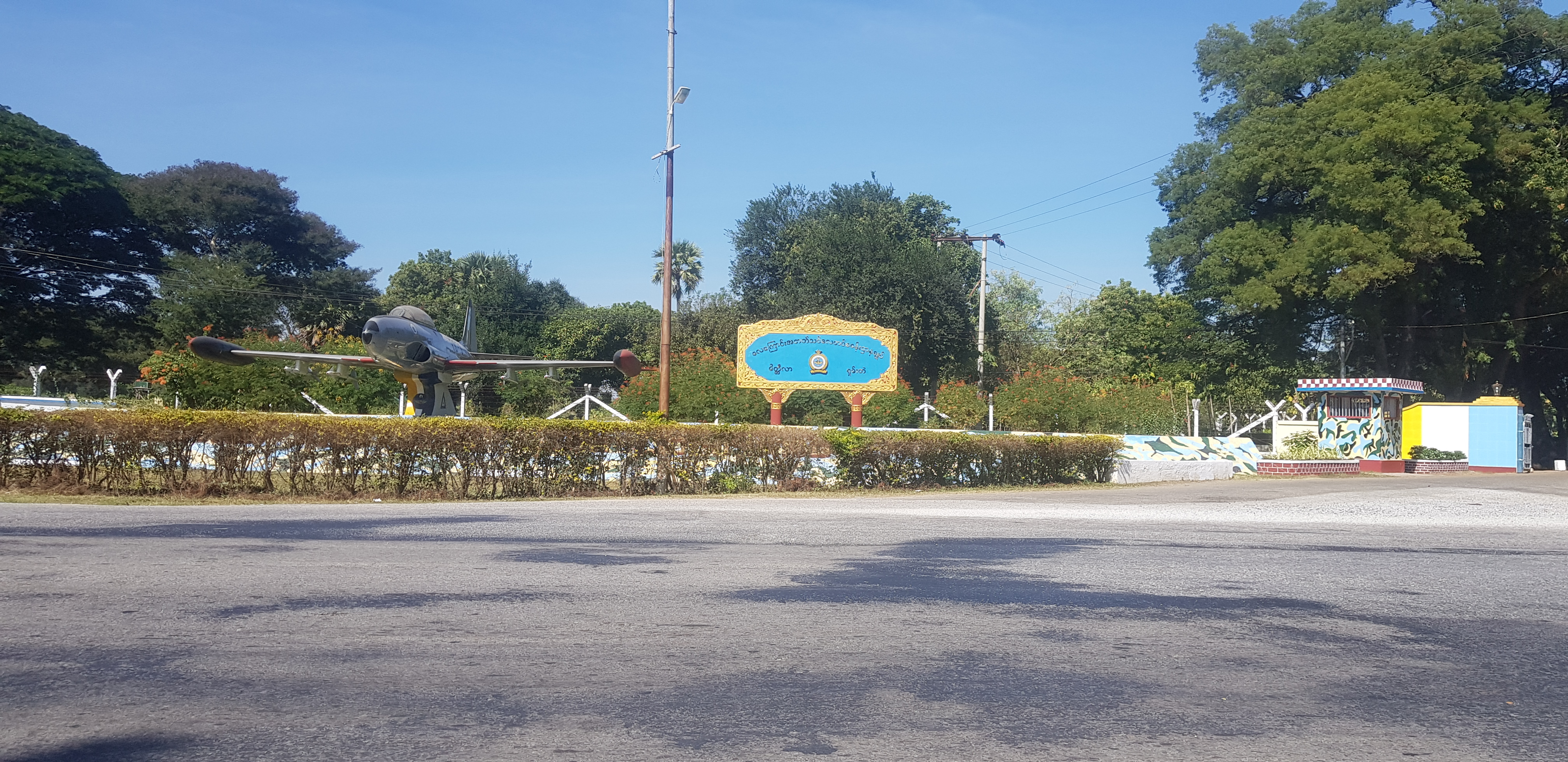
Meiktila Shante Air Base

Myanmar Air Force also utilised civilian airfields as front-line air fields in case of foreign invasion.

=== Air defence ===
The Office of the chief of Air Defence is one of the major branches of the Tatmadaw. It was established as the Air Defence Command in 1997 but was not fully operational until late 1999. It was renamed the Bureau of Air Defence in the early 2000s. In the early 2000s, the Tatmadaw established the Myanmar Integrated Air Defence System (MIADS) with help from Russia, Ukraine and China. It is a tri-service bureau with units from all three branches of Myanmar Armed Forces. All Air Defence assets except Anti-Aircraft Artillery are integrated into MIADS.

== Equipment ==
=== Aircraft ===
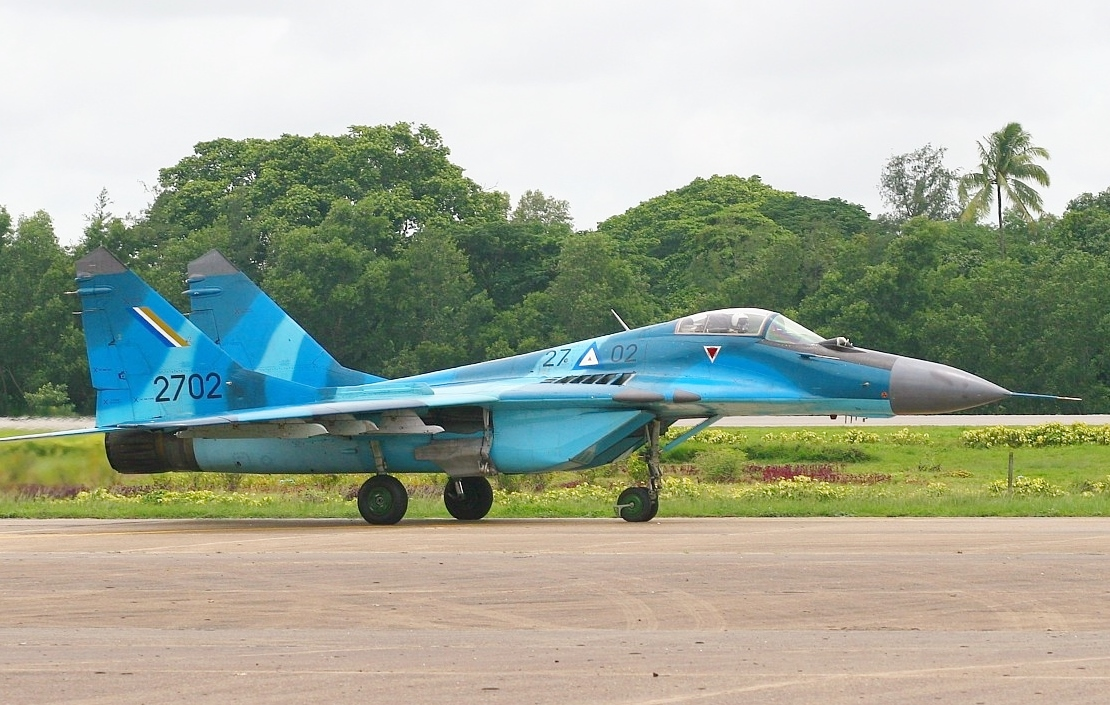
A MiG-29 sits on the tarmac

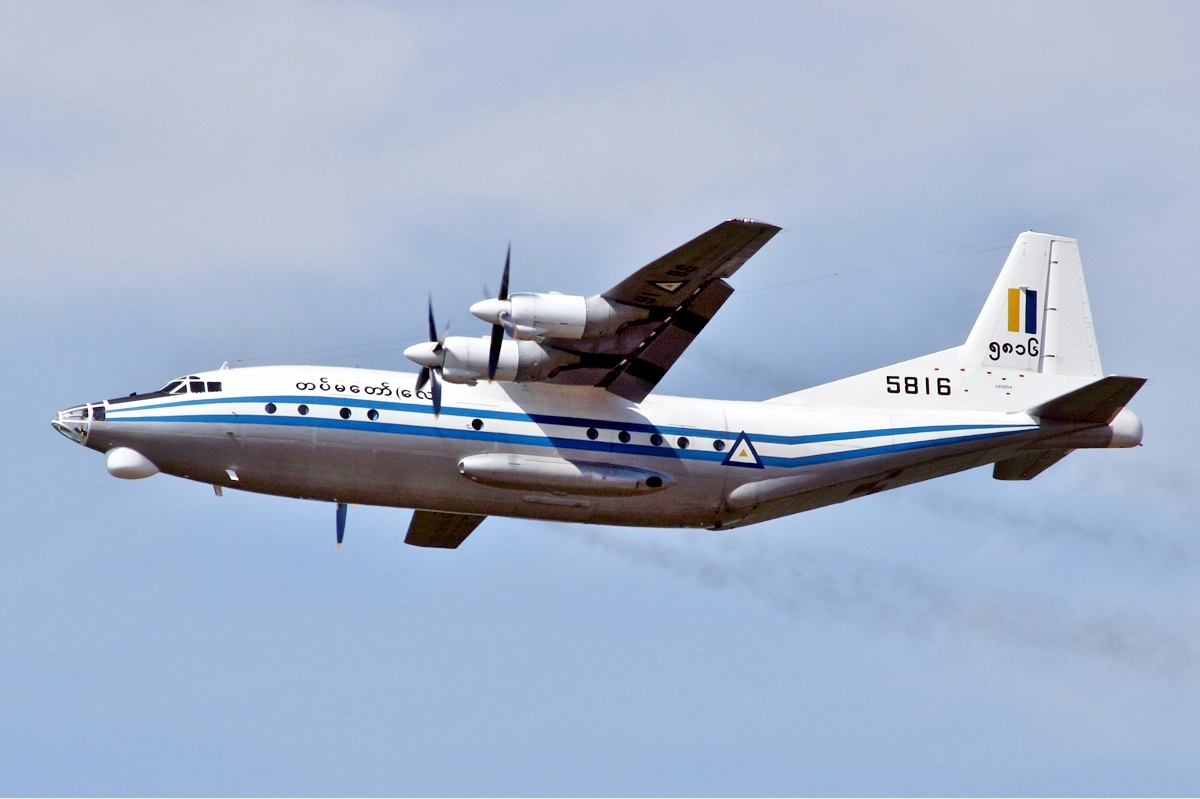
A Shaanxi Y-8 lifts off from Yangon International Airport

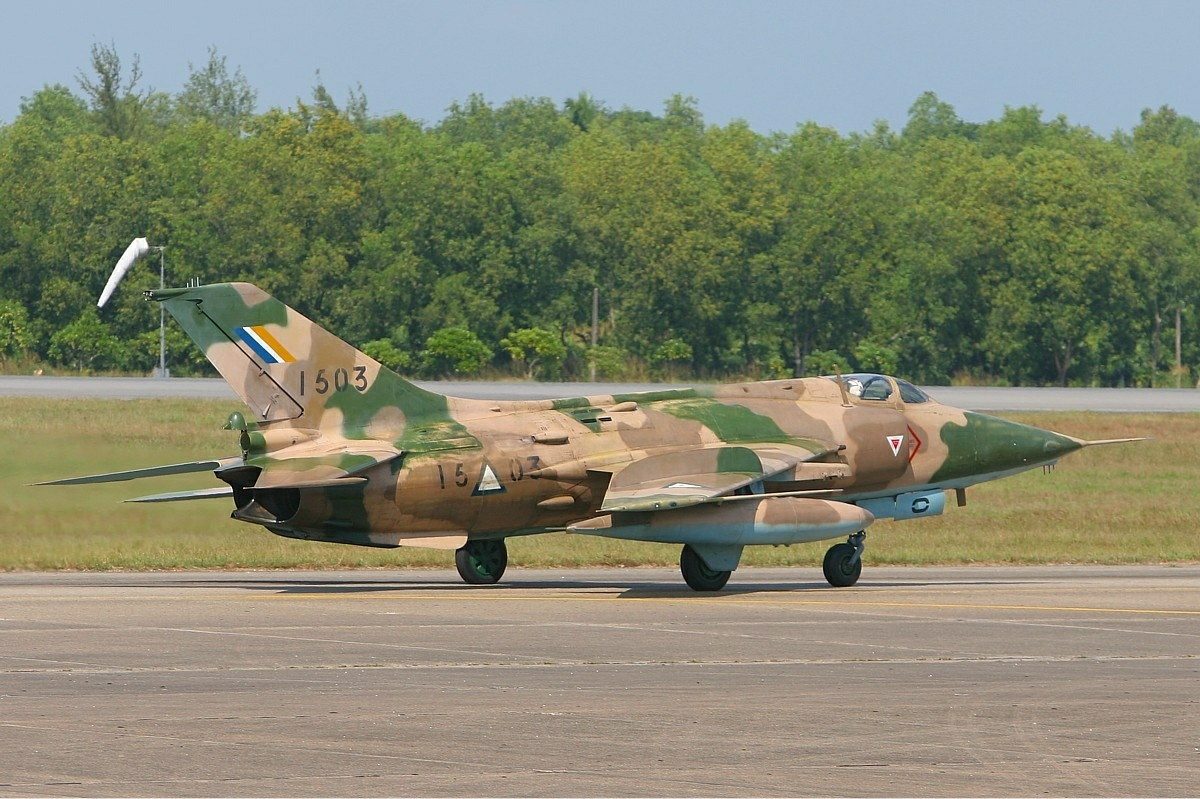
A Nanchang A-5C Fantan

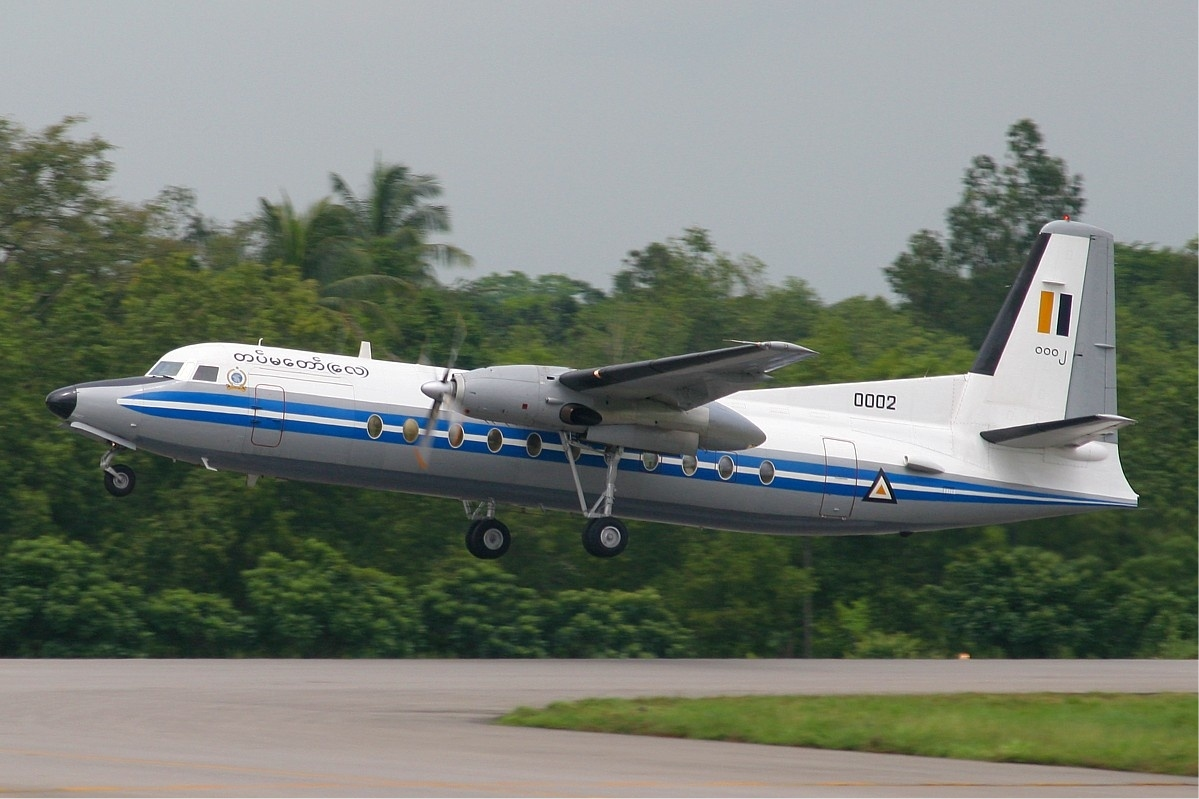
A retired Myanmar Air Force Fokker F27

Aircraft	Origin	Type	Variant	In service	Notes
Combat aircraft
Sukhoi Su-30	Russia	multirole	Su-30SME	6	
JF-17 Thunder	China / Pakistan	multirole	• JF-17 Block II • JF-17B Block II	11+	5 on order JF-17B is a Dual-seat variant.
Mikoyan MiG-29	Russia	multirole	SM/SMT	38	5 used for conversion training The breakdown is 11 MiG-29B, 6 MiG-29SE, 10 MiG-29SM and 5 MiG-29UB.In 2018, a $420 million contract was signed with India for the upgrade of a total of 26 MiG-29 aircraft to the SMT standard, constituting the first batch.
Chengdu J-7	China	fighter	F-7M/FT-7	36+	6 used for conversion training
Nanchang Q-5	China	attack	A-5C	24	
Transports
ATR 42 / ATR 72	France / Italy	VIP transport		10	of which 3 are ATR-72s
Beechcraft 1900	United States	utility / transport		7	
Britten-Norman BN-2	United Kingdom	maritime patrol		5	
Fokker 70	Netherlands	VIP transport		2	
Harbin Y-12	China	transport		15	
Let L-410	Czech Republic	utility / transport		3	
Shaanxi Y-8	China	transport		8	
Helicopters
Bell 206	United States	utility		3	
Bell UH-1	United States	utility		2	
Kamov Ka-27	Russia	utility / CSAR	Ka-28	2	
Mil Mi-2	Poland	utility / liaison		22	
Mil Mi-38	Russia	transport/VIP transport		3	
Mil Mi-8/17	Russia	utility		25+ .	
Mil Mi-24	Russia	attack	Mi-35P	24	
Trainer aircraft
Eurocopter EC120	France	rotorcraft trainer		3	
Eurocopter AS350 Écureuil	France	Light Utility Helicopter	Airbus Helicopters H125	2	
Nanchang CJ-6	China	Basic Trainer	PT-6	Unknown	
AMD Zodiac	Canada	Kit Aircraft	CH-601	6+	
Diamond DART	Austria	Trainer	DART-450	12+	
Grob G 120TP	Germany	basic trainer		24	
Guizhou JL-9	China	advanced trainer/Light multirole	FTC 2000G	12 (60 on order)	One was destroyed after a bird disabled the engine during a training flight.
Hongdu JL-8	China	jet trainer	K-8W	60+	Unknown number on order
Pilatus PC-7	Switzerland	light trainer		16	
Pilatus PC-9	Switzerland	trainer		10	
Soko G-4	Yugoslavia	trainer / light attack		3	
Yakovlev Yak-130	Russia	advanced trainer		24	
MTX-1A	Myanmar	Patrol and Basic Trainer		12	
MTX-1B	Myanmar	Patrol and Basic Trainer		8	
HAL HJT-16 Kiran	India	Intermediate/Advanced Jet Trainer		6	6 Delivered from ex- Indian stocks
UAV
CASC Rainbow	China	UCAV	CH-3A	unknown	
CASC Rainbow	China	UCAV	CH-4		produced under licence
Sky 02	China	surveillance		11	
Yellow Cat A2	Myanmar	surveillance		22	domestic variant of the CH-3A

=== Armament ===
Name	Origin	Type	Notes
Air-to-air missile
PL-2	China	Air to air missile	340 missiles obtained
PL-5	China	Air to air missile	200 missiles obtained
PL-12	China	Air to air BVR missile	60 missiles obtained
R-27	Russia	Air to air BVR missile	100 missiles obtained
R-73	Russia	Air to air Short range IR Missile	285 missiles obtained
Anti-ship missile
YJ-83	China		30 missiles obtained
Aerial bomb
LY-502	China		unknown

=== Radars ===
The Air Force has several radar installations including the three-dimensional surveillance YLC-2 Radar, the P-37 Early-warning radar system, the JLP-40 defensive radar, and the Galaxy EWR system, which is linked with Integrated Air Defence office.

== Markings ==
Myanmar national insignia (white triangle with yellow field in the centre and borders in blue) is usually applied on six positions. The serialling system of Myanmar Air Force aircraft is suggested to serve as both – unit and individual aircraft identity, this could not be confirmed so far, however. Most of the older aeroplanes carried the serials with the prefix "UB" and the numbers in Burmese. Sometimes the serials were outlined in white. Combat aircraft generally carry serials in black.

== Accidents and incidents ==
On 24 January 1980, a Burma Air Force FH-227 crashed when an engine failed shortly after take-off, killing all but one of the 44 people on board. One person on the ground was injured.

On 11 June 2014, a MiG-29UB caught fire and crashed on to farmland near Myothit township of Magway at 8:30 a.m. (local time). The two pilots safely ejected.

On 10 February 2016, a Beech 1900 aircraft crashed after taking off from Naypidaw Airport, killing 5 military personnel.

On 14 June 2016, an Mil Mi-2 helicopter crashed near the Yangon–Mandalay Expressway at being refuelled at the Taungngu airbase, killing three military servicemen on board.

2017 Myanmar Air Force Shaanxi Y-8 crash: On 7 June 2017, a Shaanxi Y-8 was reported missing 30 nautical miles (56 km) west to Dawei. The aircraft was carrying 122 people. There were no survivors.

On 3 April 2018, an F-7 fighter aircraft of Taungoo Air Base crashed into a farm near KyunKone Village in Taungoo. The aircraft was on a training route during the crash while trying to land on the ground at around 11:30 am, killing its pilot.

On 16 October 2018, two F-7Ms crashed near Magway, Myanmar, killing both pilots and a civilian on the ground. Both aircraft struck a broadcast tower. One plummeted into a rice paddy, while the other nose-dived near a Buddhist pagoda in the Magway region of central Myanmar.

On 3 May 2021, one Mi-35 helicopter was shot down near the town of Moemauk in Kachin province by the Kachin Independence Army in response to the MAF's air raid. There was no confirmation from the MAF nor the KIA on which AA system was used by the KIA in the incident.

On 11 June 2021, a Beechcraft 1900 crashed on its landing approach to Pyin Oo Lwin's airport, killing 12 people including a senior Buddhist monk, the abbot of Zay Kone Monastery in Pyinmana.

On 16 February 2022, an A-5 ground-attack jet crashed near Ohn Taw village in Sagaing Region.

On 29 March 2022, an Mi-17 helicopter crashed and injured five people on board near Hakha, Chin State.

On 11 November 2023, a K-8W trainer aircraft of the Myanmar Air Force crashed in Hpruso Township, Karenni State. Local rebels claimed to have shot it down, while the Myanmar Air Force claimed that it was a mechanical failure, and the pilot was later captured.

On 3 January 2024, an Mi-17 was shot down by the Kachin Independence Army using FN-6 MANPADS in Waimaw Township, Kachin State, killing all seven people on board.

On 16 January 2024, the Kachin Independence Army successfully shot down an FTC-2000G trainer/fighter of the Myanmar Air Force in the Namhpatkar area of northern Shan State.

In January 2024, a Myanmar Air Force Y-8 on a mission to evacuate troops who had sought refuge in Mizoram, India, overshot its landing in Lengpui Airport. There were no deaths but the plane was badly damaged.

On 29 January 2024, the Karen National Liberation Army shot down a MAF helicopter above Myawaddy Township near the Thai border. During the incident, Brigadier General Aye Min Naung, the 44th LI Division commander, Colonel Soe Tun Lwin, LI Battalion 9's acting commander, pilot Colonel Toe Oo and two army captains were supposedly killed according to military sources.

On 29 February 2024, a MiG-29SMT fighter of Myanmar Air Force crashed in the southwest of Salin District, Magway Region. This aircraft crashed when it was on its way to a combat mission. The Myanmar military blamed the crash on a technical failure. One pilot ejected successfully and escaped the crash.

On 2 August 2024, a Myanmar Air Force Eurocopter AS365 Dauphin crashed after takeoff near Hmawbi Airport, Yangon. The aircraft was on a training flight and the cause of the crash was blamed on an engine failure. 2 were injured and 2 were killed. The deceased were identified as Maj-Gen Soe Tin Latt and Copilot Col Myo Thaung.

On 20 May 2025, a Myanmar Air Force Mil Mi-17 was shot down by an FPV drone of the Kachin Independence Army while transporting reinforcements to the city of Bhamo, and crashed 14 miles from Shwegu. Reportedly, all 18 passengers on board were killed, including the pilot.

On 10 June 2025, an F-7M fighter jet crashed into a house in Sabarsae village in Pearl township during an air operation to assist defending of battle against Myanmar pro-Democracy Alliance Forces. People's Liberation Army (PLA), one of the rebel militia group, participating in operation, claims that they shot down the jet. However, spoke person from other rebel group denied and said it crashed itself.

On 1 July 2025, a Guizhou FTC-2000G trainer/fighter jet lost contact due to severe weather or technical malfunction during night flying mission. On 3 Jul 2025, a video of the member of KNDF forces celebrating on the wreckage of crashed jet appear on social media. Both pilots were killed.

A Mil Mi-17 helicopter was struck by a suicide drone on 23 June 2026 by the insurgent forces. The aircraft was struck while preparing for takeoff.

Two unidentified aircraft were damaged beyond repair on 10 September 2026 following an FPV drone attack conducted by the People's Defense Forces (PDF) at Mandalay International Airport. Two others were damaged.

== See also ==
- Myanmar Army
- Myanmar Navy
- Military intelligence of Myanmar
- Myanmar Police Force

== Bibliography ==
- Aloni, Shlomo & Arnold, Peter R. (January–February 1999). "From Israel to Burma: Operation Orez, Supplying and Ferrying Spitfires, Part Two". Air Enthusiast (79): 2–11. ISSN 0143-5450.
- Gurdon, Philip (March–April 1999). "A Sudden & Dusty Arrival: Belly-landing a Spitfire During a Ferry Flight". Air Enthusiast (80): 60. ISSN 0143-5450.
- Hoyle, Craig. "World Air Forces Directory". Flight International, Vol. 182, No. 5370, 11–17 December 2012. pp. 40–64. ISSN 0015-3710.
- Hoyle, Craig (25 November 2022). "2023 World Air Forces". FlightGlobal.
- World Aircraft Information Files. Brightstar Publishing, London. File 333 Sheet 05
