= Basic Education High School No. 5 Taungoo =

School in Myanmar

Coordinates: 18°55′58″N 96°27′21″E

Taungoo 5 High School အ.ထ.က. (၅) တောင်ငူ
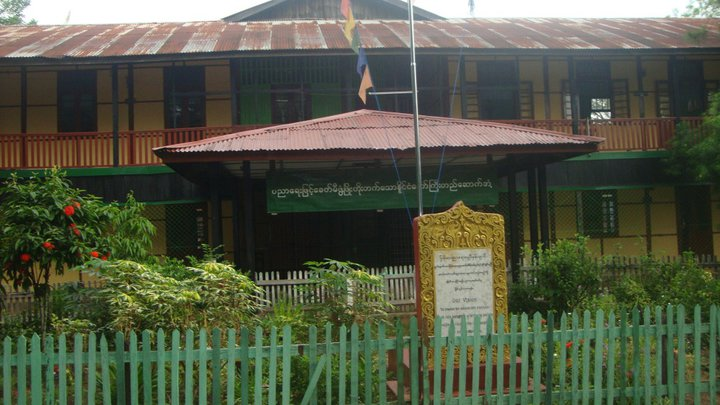
- Taungoo, Bago Region; Myanmar

Information
- Type: Public
- School number: 5
- Grades: 1-11

Basic Education High School No. 5 Taungoo ( (Burmese: အခြေခံ ပညာ အထက်တန်း ကျောင်း အမှတ် (၅) တောင်ငူ) is a public high school located in Taungoo, Bago Division, Myanmar. It used to be known Paku Karen High School runs by Paku Karen Baptist Association. In 1965, the school was nationalized and become No.5 State High School, Taungoo. The school is situated on Myogyi Road. The school has 80 full-time teachers and 1,000 students. The school offers a variety of sports for both girls and boys to compete in varsity and junior varsity levels.
