= Hmawbi Air Base =

Airbase of the Myanmar Air Force

Hmawbi Air Base
- မှော်ဘီ-လေတပ်
- Hmawbi in Myanmar

Site information
- Owner: Myanmar Armed Forces
- Operator: Myanmar Air Force
- Controlled by: Eastern SOC

Location
- Coordinates: 17°07′14″N 96°04′05″E

Site history
- Built: 1945
- In use: 1945 -

Airfield information
- Elevation: 22 metres (72 ft) AMSL
Runways
Direction	Length and surface
09/27	2,440 metres (8,005 ft) Asphalt

Hmawbi Air Base is an airbase of the Myanmar Air Force in Hmawbi Township, Yangon Region, Myanmar (Burma).

The base is home to 56 Squadron which flies the Mil Mi-17.

History

The base was formerly used by the British Royal Air Force as RAF Hmawbi, the following units were here at some point:

- No. 47 Squadron RAF between 15 August 1945 and 15 January 1946 with the de Havilland Mosquito VI
- No. 84 Squadron RAF between 10 and 12 September 1945 with the Mosquito VI
- No. 89 Squadron RAF between 6 and 25 September 1945 with the Mosquito XIX
- No. 96 Squadron RAF between 4 September 1945 and 16 April 1946 with the Douglas Dakota
- No. 110 Squadron RAF between 16 August 1945 and 11 September 1945 with the Mosquito VI
- No. 117 Squadron RAF between 19 August and 17 December 1945 with the Dakota
- No. 215 Squadron RAF between 19 August and 23 October 1945 with the Dakota
