= Pacu (disambiguation) =

Pacu is the common name of several South American fishes. Pacu may also refer to:

== People ==
- Jovan Paču (1847–1902), Serbian composer and pianist
- Lazar Paču (1855–1915), Serbian doctor and politician

== Sports ==
- Pacu races – traditional Native Indonesian (Minangkabau) races in Sumatra
  - Pacu Itiak – Minangkabau duck racing
  - Pacu Jalur – Minangkabau watercraft racing
  - Pacu Jawi – Minangkabau bull racing
  - Pacu Kudo/Pacu Bugih – Minangkabau horse racing

== Rivers ==
- Pacu River (Amajari River tributary), in northern Brazil
- Pacu River (Catrimani River tributary), in northern Brazil
- Pacu River (Pará), in north-central Brazil

== Other ==
- Post-anesthesia care unit (PACU), a recovery area found in many medical facilities

== See also ==
- Paku (disambiguation)
