= Technological University, Taungoo =

Higher education institute in Bago Region, Myanmar

Coordinates: 19°05′23″N 96°22′24″E

Technological University(Toungoo)
- နည်းပညာတက္ကသိုလ် (တောင်ငူ)
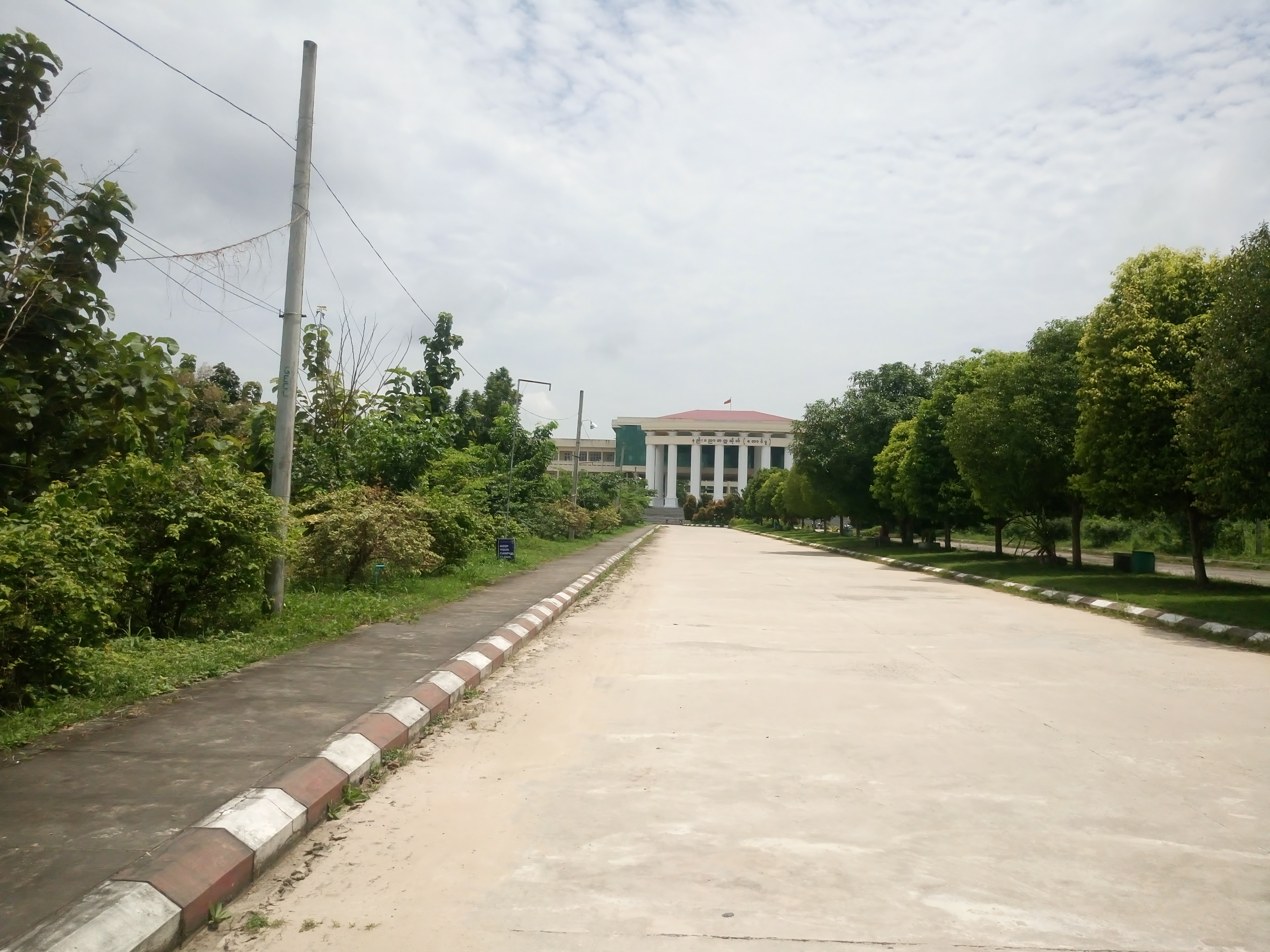
- Former names: Government Technical Institute; Government Technological College
- Type: Public
- Established: 2007; 19 years ago
- Principal: Dr. Mg Mg Latt
- Location: Toungoo, Bago Region, Myanmar

The Technological University (Toungoo) is located in Toungoo, Bago Region, Myanmar. It was founded as a Technical High School on 30 June 1982. It was known as Government Technical Institute and then changed to Government Technical College, and it was upgraded to the university Level in 2007.

== Departments ==
- Civil Engineering Department
- Electronic Engineering Department
- Electrical Power Engineering Department
- Mechanical Engineering Department
- Mechatronic Engineering Department
- Information Technology Department
- Myanmar Department
- Engineering English Department
- Engineering Mathematics Department
- Engineering Physics Department
- Engineering Chemistry Department

== Programs ==
Technological University (Taungoo) offers the following degree programs. These are

- Undergraduate Degree Program
- Graduate Degree Program

No	Graduate Progran	Degree	Duration
1	Bachelor of Engineering(Civil)	B.E	6 Years; Full; Time
2	Bachelor of Engineering(EC)	B.E	6 Years; Full; Time
3	Bachelor of Engineering(EP)	B.E	6 Years; Full; Time
4	Bachelor of Engineering(Mech)	B.E	6 Years; Full; Time
5	Bachelor of Engineering(MC)	B.E	6 Years; Full; Time
6	Bachelor of Engineering(Arch)	B.E	6 Years; Full; Time
7	Bachelor of Engineering(Chem)	B.E	6 Years; Full; Time
8	Bachelor of Engineering(IT)	B.E	6 Years; Full; Time
9	Bachelor of Engineering(Bio)	B.E	6 Years; Full; Time
