= Myazigon Pagoda =

Buddhist Pagoda in Taungoo, Myanmar

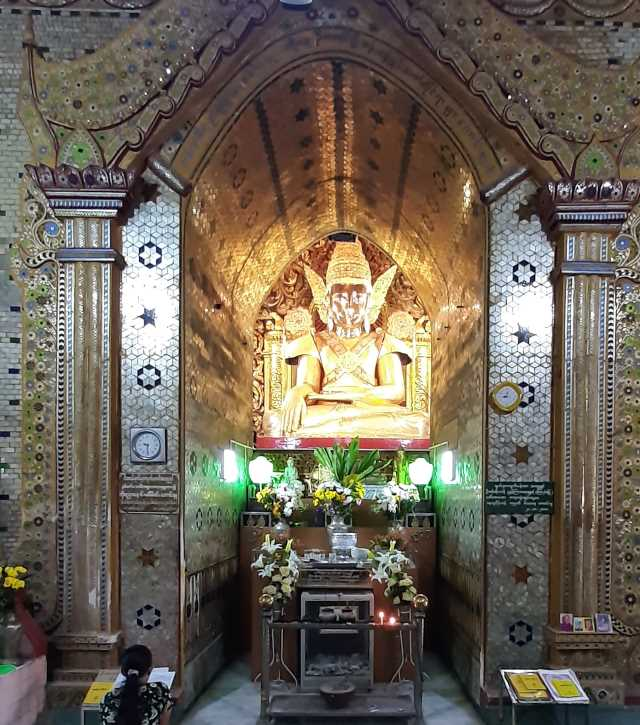
- The statue depicts the seated Buddha in a cross-legged position.

- Location within Myanmar

Religion
- Affiliation: Buddhism
- Sect: Theravada Buddhism
- Region: Bago Region
- Status: active

Location
- Location: Taungoo, Myanmar
- Country: Myanmar
- Coordinates: 18.936437°N 96.435266°E

The Myazigon Pagoda (sometimes known as the Myasigon Pagoda) is a Buddhist temple in Taungoo, Myanmar. Built in either the 16th or the 19th century, the temple contains several images of members of the Toungoo dynasty (which ruled Taungoo) and a large sitting bronze statue of the Buddha that was captured in a Toungoo war against the Ayutthaya Kingdom.
