= Soe Tin Latt =

Burmese air force officer and commander (died 2024)

His Excellency Major General Soe Tin Latt
- စိုးတင်လတ်

Commander of Southern Regional Air Command
- In office 2024 – 2 August 2024

Commander of Magway Air Base Command
- In office 2024 – 2 August 2024

Personal details
- Born: Myanmar (Burma)
- Died: 2 August 2024 Hmawbi Air Base, Yangon, Myanmar
- Cause of death: Helicopter crash

Military service
- Branch/service: Myanmar Air Force
- Rank: Major General

Major General Soe Tin Latt (Burmese: စိုးတင်လတ်; born Myanmar; died 2 August 2024) was a senior Burmese air force officer who served as the commander of the Southern Regional Air Command. He held various leadership positions throughout his military career and was involved in overseeing air operations in Myanmar’s southern region. Soe Tin Latt died in a helicopter accident on 2 August 2024.

== Early life and education ==
Soe Tin Latt was born in Myanmar. Publicly available information on his early life and education is limited. It is customary for Myanmar military officers of his rank to have received formal training at military academies such as the Defence Services Academy or the Myanmar Air Force Academy; however, specific details about his education have not been published.

== Military career ==
Soe Tin Latt advanced through the ranks of the Myanmar Air Force to reach the rank of Major General. Prior to commanding the Southern Regional Air Command, he served as the commander of air bases including Magway and Myitkyina, where he was responsible for operational management and unit readiness.

As commander of the Southern Regional Air Command, Soe Tin Latt was responsible for coordinating and supervising air force operations within the southern military region of Myanmar. His duties included overseeing operational planning, training, logistics, and support functions for air units assigned to that command.

== Death ==
On 2 August 2024, Major General Soe Tin Latt died in a helicopter crash near Hmawbi Air Base, Yangon. The accident also resulted in the death of the helicopter’s co-pilot, Colonel Mya Thaung. Additional personnel onboard sustained injuries. The Myanmar military reported that adverse weather conditions contributed to the crash, and an official investigation was conducted.
