= Pakupaku =

Pakupaku Temporal range: Tonian

Scientific classification
- Domain: Eukaryota
- Kingdom: incertae sedis
- Genus: †Pakupaku; Riedman, Porter & Calver, 2018

Type species
- †Pakupaku kabin Riedman, Porter & Calver, 2018

Pakupaku is an extinct genus of vase-shaped microfossil from the Tonian Black River Dolomite of Australia. The type species is Pakupaku kabin.
