= Taungoo Educational College =

Coordinates: 18.9466°N 96.4410°E

Taungoo Educational College is located at Taungoo, Bago Division, Myanmar. Formerly it was the Convent High School under the Taungoo, Roman Catholic Diocese. After nationalization, it became Teacher's Training College. In 2000, the name was changed to Taungoo Educational College and the government upgraded the level. Primarily a teacher training college, the college offers bachelor's and master's in education to the country's prospective primary, secondary and tertiary school teachers.

== Programs ==
- Diploma in Teacher Education (DTEd)
- Bachelor of Science in Education(BSc.Ed)
- Bachelor of Art in Education (BA.Ed)
- Postgraduate Preservice Primary Teacher Training (PPTT)

== Affiliated universities and colleges ==
Along with the Yangon Institute of Education, the Taungoo Educational College is affiliated with 21 educational colleges located throughout the country.

- Bogalay Education College
- Dawei Education College
- Hlegu Education College
- Hpa-An Education College
- Kyaukphyu Education College
- Lashio Education College
- Magway Education College
- Mandalay Education College
- Mawlamyaing Education College
- Monywa Education College
- Meiktila Education College
- Myaungmya Education College
- Myitkyina Education College
- Pakokku Education College
- Pathein Education College
- Pyay Education College
- Sagaing Education College
- Taunggoo Education College
- Taunggyi Education College
- Thingangyun Education College
- Yankin Education College
