= Taungoo =

Taungoo တောင်ငူမြို့
- Town
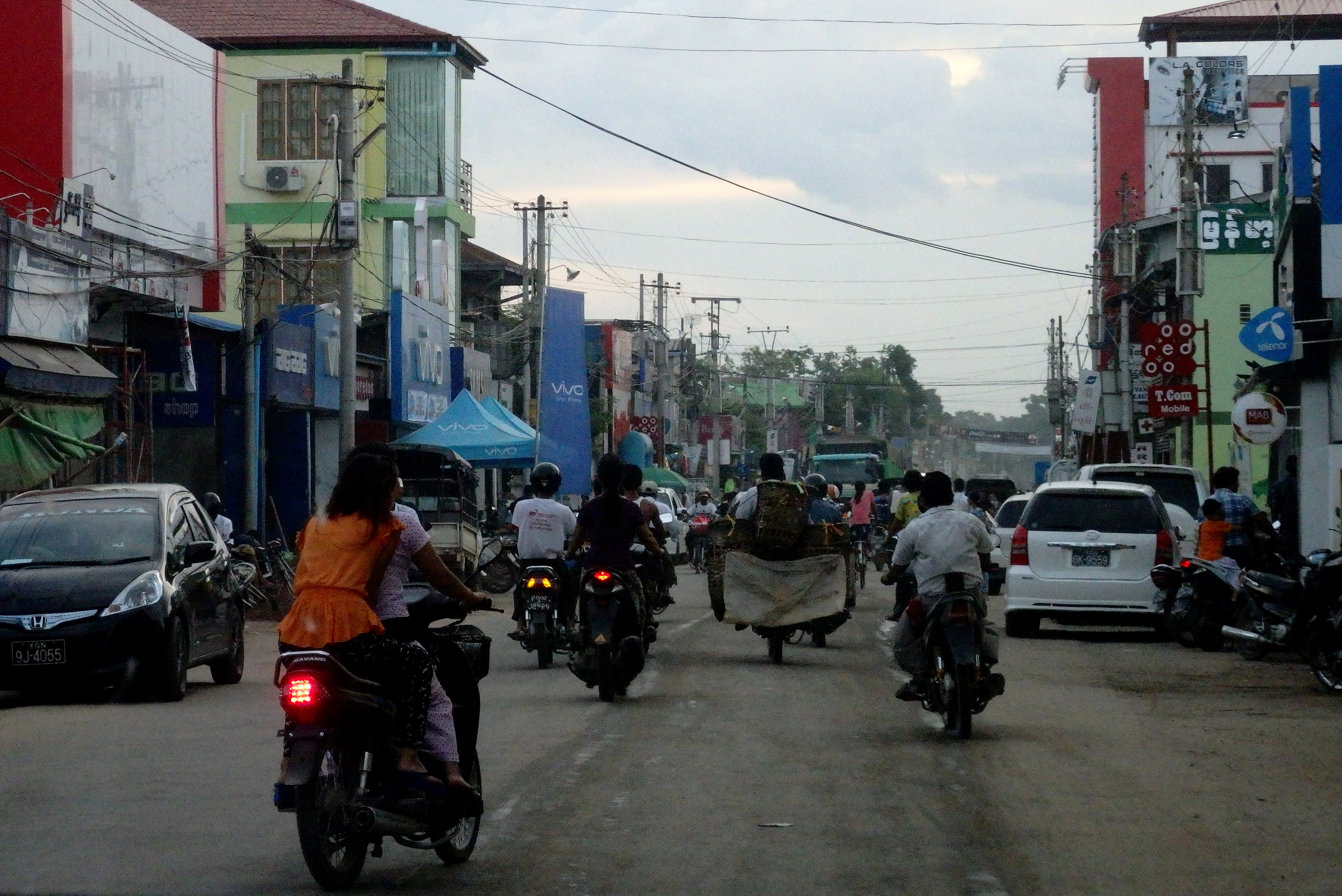

- Location in Burma
- Coordinates: 18°56′N 96°26′E
- Country: Myanmar
- Division: Bago Region
- District: Taungoo District
- Township: Taungoo Township
- Founded: 17 April 1279

Government
  - Type: District government and Township government

Population (2014)
  - Urban: 108,569
  - Ethnicities: Burman Karen
  - Religions: Theravada Buddhism Christianity
- Time zone: UTC+6:30 (MMT)

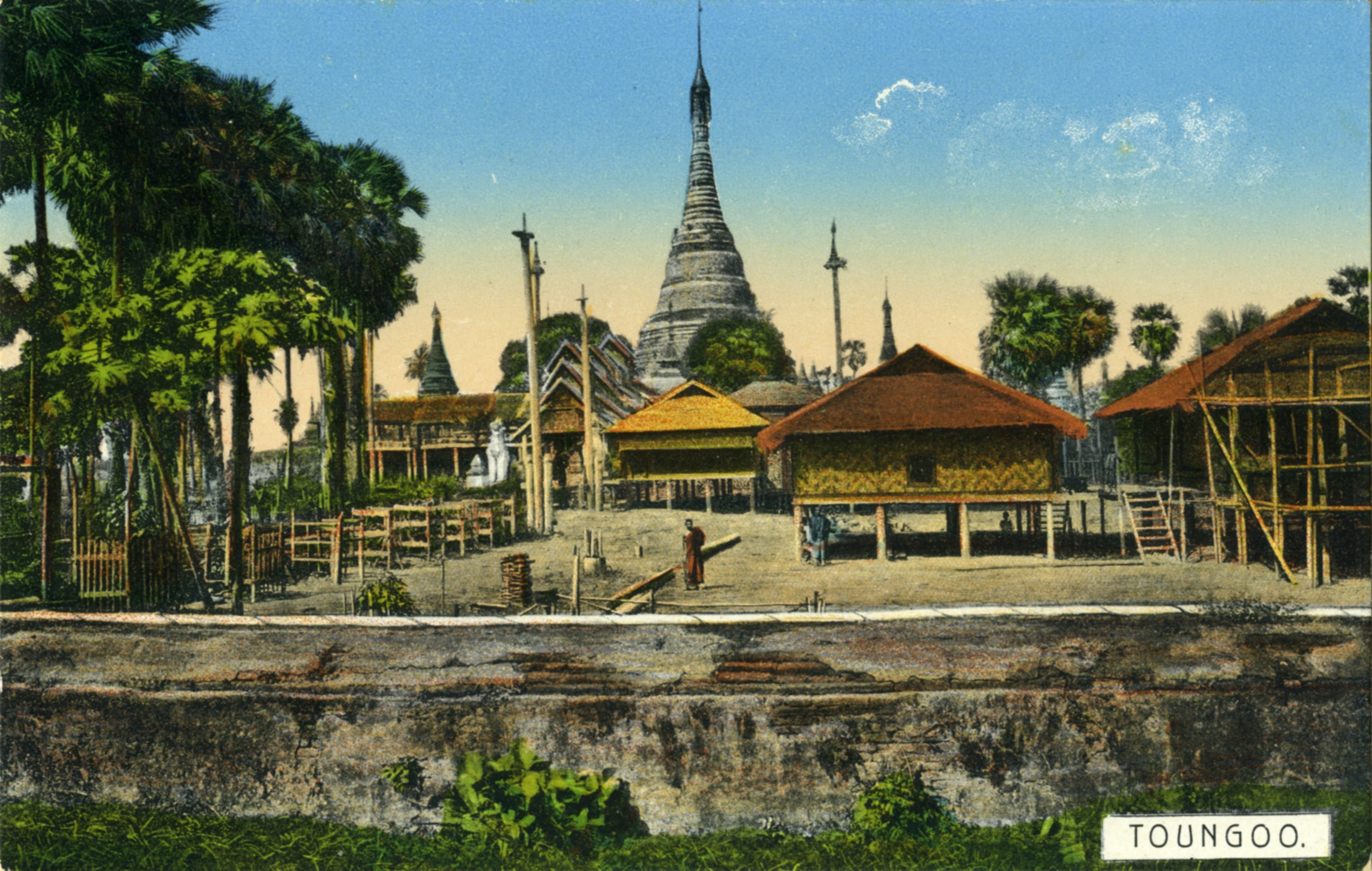
Old postcard

Taungoo (Burmese: တောင်ငူမြို့, MLCTS: taung ngu mrui., pronounced [tàʊɰ̃ŋù mjo̰] Tauñngu myoú; S'gaw Karen: တီအူ), also spelled Toungoo and formerly Toung-ngú, is a district-level city in the Bago Region of Myanmar, 220 km from Yangon, towards the north-eastern end of the division, with mountain ranges to the east and west. Hanthawaddy United Football Club is based in Taungoo.

In the 16th century it was the first capital of the Toungoo dynasty.

== Names ==
The classical Pali name of Taungoo is Ketumadi (ကေတုမဒီ;Pali: Ketumadi), which translates to "endowed with the royal standard."

== History ==
Taungoo was founded in 1279 in the waning days of Pagan as part of frontier expansion southwards. After the fall of Pagan Empire in 1287, Taungoo came under the rule of Myinsaing Kingdom and later Pinya Kingdom. In 1358, Taungoo successfully revolted and became independent until 1367 when it became a nominal part of the Ava Kingdom. Its rulers retained a large degree of autonomy, playing larger Ava and Hanthawaddy kingdoms against each other. In 1470, Ava put down another rebellion and made Sithu Kyawhtin, the general who defeated the rebellion, governor. Sithu Kyawhtin's grandson Mingyi Nyo became governor of Taungoo in 1485. Under Mingyi Nyo's leadership, the principality grew powerful. In October 1510, Mingyi Nyo formally broke away from Ava and founded the Taungoo Kingdom.

Mingyi Nyo's successors Tabinshwehti and Bayinnaung went on to found the largest empire in the history of south-east Asia. Taungoo's stint as capital was short-lived, however. Tabinshwehti moved the kingdom's capital to Pegu (Bago) in 1539. The city briefly again became capital of a rebellion in 1599 when viceroy Minye Thihathu II of Taungoo declared himself king. In December 1599, Taungoo's forces in collaboration with the Arakanese armies, aided by Portuguese mercenaries, sacked Pegu. The rebellious city-state remained independent for another 10 years when Natshinnaung ascended the Taungoo throne in 1609. In the following year, King Anaukpetlun captured Taungoo and ended the city's long line of rulers. Although few visible historic remains survive, all four sides of the brick city wall remain from the dynastic period, with the exception of the part of the southern wall. The 9.6 m wide moat has largely dried up, except for a section on the eastern side, which is still maintained.

By the mid-19th century, Taungoo was governed by a local governor appointed by the Konbaung kings. The Taungoo District consisted of 52 wards, including today's Pyinmana (and Naypyidaw) regions. The district was cut in half after the Second Anglo-Burmese War. The British annexed the southern half, including the city of Taungoo, while the northern portion, including Pyinmana and Ela, remained under Burmese control. British troops were withdrawn in 1893.

In 1940, the British Royal Air Force built an airfield north of the town, which from August 1941 through February 1942 served as a training and support base for the 1st American Volunteer Group, popularly known as the Flying Tigers.

In the Battle of the Yunnan-Burma Road in 1942, the Imperial Japanese Army attacked the Chinese Expeditionary Force in Burma in what is known as the Battle of Toungoo.

Taungoo celebrated its 500th birthday on 16 October 2010 by reconstructing and renovating many city attractions.

== Geography ==
Three mountain ranges traverse the district—the Pegu Yomas, the Karen Hills, and the Nat Ma Taung or "Great Watershed"—all of which have a north and south direction, and are covered for the most part with dense forest. The Pegu Yomas have a general elevation of from 800 to 1,200 feet (240 to 370 m), while the central range averages from 2,000 to 3,000 feet (610 to 910 m). The rest of Taungoo forms the upper portion of the valley of the Sittaung River.

== Climate ==
Taungoo has a tropical savanna climate (Köppen climate classification Aw) bordering on a tropical monsoon climate (Köppen climate classification Am). Temperatures are hot throughout the year, and the months before the monsoon (March–May) are especially hot with average maximum temperatures exceeding 35 °C (95 °F). There is a winter dry season (November–March) and a summer wet season (April–October).

Climate data for Taungoo (1991–2020, extremes 1942–1994)
| Month | Jan | Feb | Mar | Apr | May | Jun | Jul | Aug | Sep | Oct | Nov | Dec | Year |
|---|---|---|---|---|---|---|---|---|---|---|---|---|---|
| Record high °C (°F) | 35.6 (96.1) | 40.0 (104.0) | 42.8 (109.0) | 42.8 (109.0) | 42.2 (108.0) | 38.9 (102.0) | 37.2 (99.0) | 36.1 (97.0) | 37.2 (99.0) | 37.5 (99.5) | 35.0 (95.0) | 38.9 (102.0) | 42.8 (109.0) |
| Mean daily maximum °C (°F) | 31.3 (88.3) | 34.2 (93.6) | 37.0 (98.6) | 38.3 (100.9) | 35.4 (95.7) | 31.4 (88.5) | 30.3 (86.5) | 30.1 (86.2) | 31.7 (89.1) | 32.8 (91.0) | 32.1 (89.8) | 30.7 (87.3) | 32.9 (91.2) |
| Daily mean °C (°F) | 23.3 (73.9) | 25.3 (77.5) | 28.7 (83.7) | 31.3 (88.3) | 30.0 (86.0) | 27.7 (81.9) | 27.0 (80.6) | 26.9 (80.4) | 27.7 (81.9) | 28.0 (82.4) | 26.2 (79.2) | 23.7 (74.7) | 27.2 (81.0) |
| Mean daily minimum °C (°F) | 15.3 (59.5) | 16.5 (61.7) | 20.4 (68.7) | 24.3 (75.7) | 24.5 (76.1) | 23.9 (75.0) | 23.7 (74.7) | 23.8 (74.8) | 23.8 (74.8) | 23.2 (73.8) | 20.4 (68.7) | 16.8 (62.2) | 21.4 (70.5) |
| Record low °C (°F) | 8.3 (46.9) | 8.3 (46.9) | 12.2 (54.0) | 16.1 (61.0) | 13.9 (57.0) | 18.3 (64.9) | 21.1 (70.0) | 20.0 (68.0) | 17.8 (64.0) | 17.8 (64.0) | 12.2 (54.0) | 9.4 (48.9) | 8.3 (46.9) |
| Average precipitation mm (inches) | 5.5 (0.22) | 3.4 (0.13) | 8.0 (0.31) | 29.2 (1.15) | 197.3 (7.77) | 344.4 (13.56) | 436.7 (17.19) | 461.3 (18.16) | 288.0 (11.34) | 147.0 (5.79) | 40.7 (1.60) | 5.8 (0.23) | 1,967.4 (77.46) |
| Average precipitation days (≥ 1.0 mm) | 0.7 | 0.3 | 0.7 | 3.0 | 13.1 | 23.6 | 27.1 | 27.1 | 21.3 | 11.8 | 3.1 | 0.7 | 132.5 |
Source 1: World Meteorological Organization
Source 2: Sistema de Clasificación Bioclimática Mundial (records)

== Administration ==
- Taungoo District (The district combined has a 6 townships: Taungoo, Phyu, Yedashe, Tantabin, Kyaukkyi, and Oktwin).

== Demographics ==
The population of Taungoo in the 2014 census was 108,569; in the 1983 census it was 65,851.

== Education ==
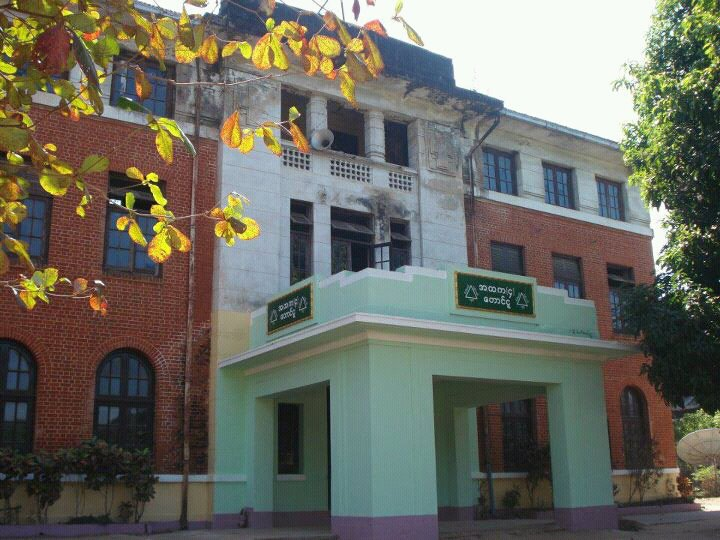
Basic Education High School 4

Public universities and colleges include Taungoo University, Taungoo Educational College, University of Computer Studies, and Technological University.

It is also the site of Paku Divinity School.

== Notable sites ==
- Myasigon Pagoda

== Notable residents ==
- Soe Pyae Thazin, actress

== Gallery ==
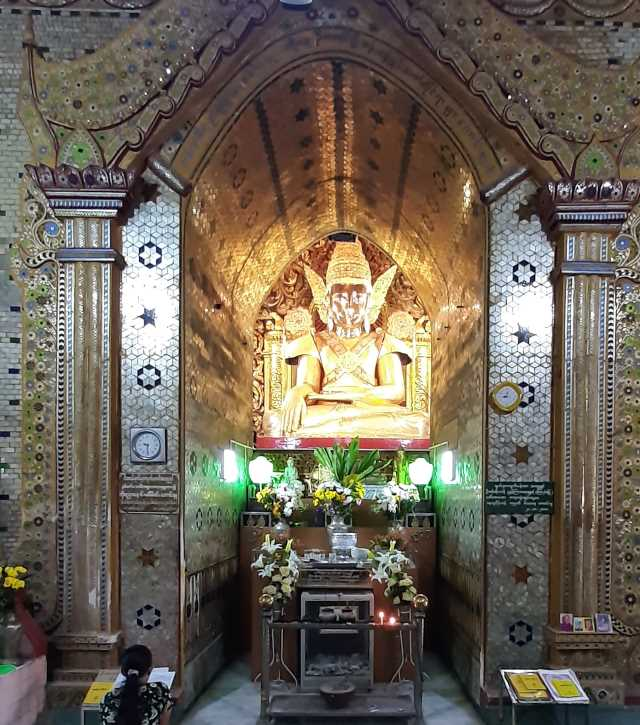
Myazigon Pagoda

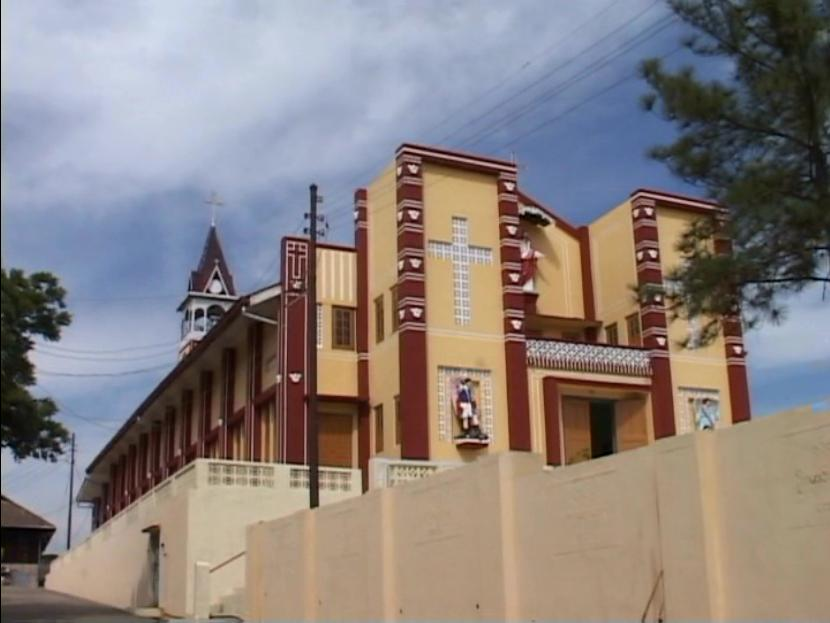
Sacred Heart Roman Catholic Cathedral

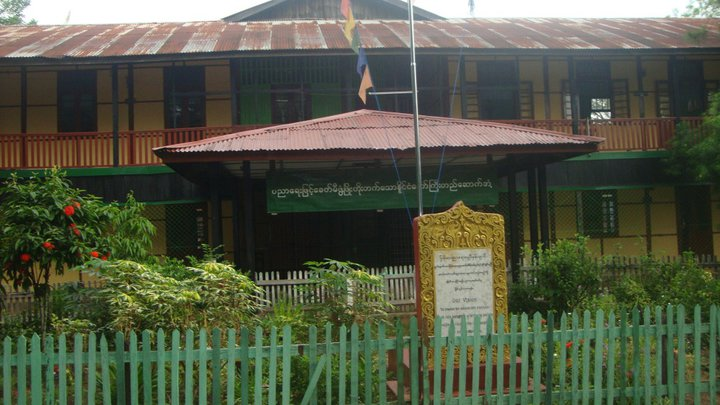
No.5 State High School, Taungoo

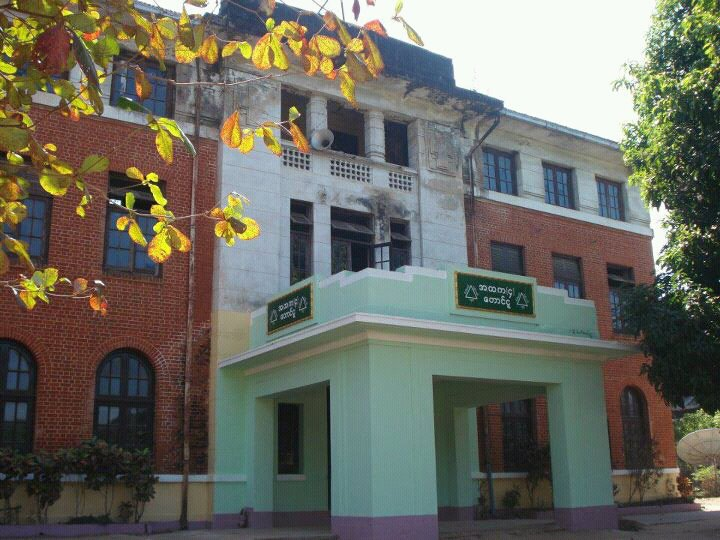
No.4 State High School, Taungoo

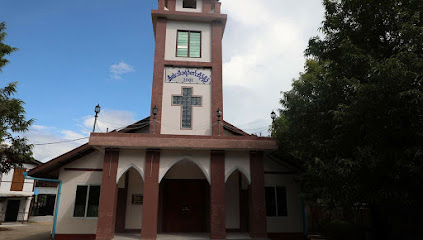
Hsaw Hti Thaw Karen Baptist Church

Paku Karen Baptist Association

Taungoo
| Preceded by Ava | Capital of Burma; 16 October 1510 – January 1539 | Succeeded by Bago |
| Preceded by Bago | Capital of Burma; 11 January 1551 – 12 March 1552 | Succeeded by Bago |
