= Paku Karen Baptist Association =

Baptist association in Taungoo, Myanmar

Coordinates: 18°56′00.3″N 96°27′26.1″E

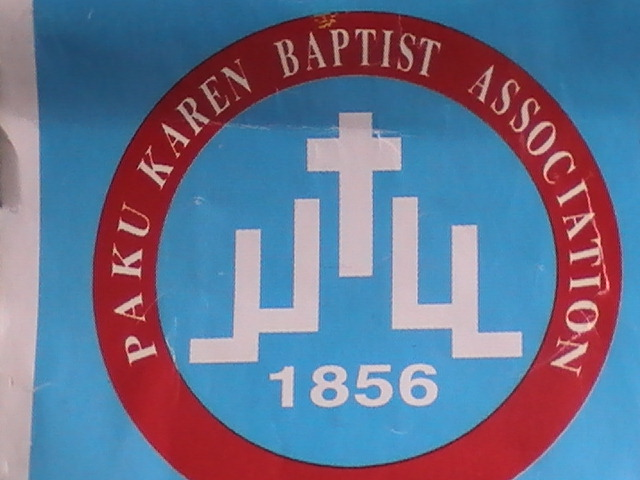
- Classification: Evangelical Christianity
- Theology: Baptist
- Associations: Karen Baptist Convention, Myanmar Baptist Convention, Myanmar Council of Churches
- Headquarters: Taungoo, Taungoo
- Origin: 1856; 170 years ago

Paku Karen Baptist Association, also known as Paku Kayin Baptist Association, is a Baptist Christian denomination in Myanmar. It is affiliated with the Karen Baptist Convention.

It is affiliated with the Paku Divinity School, a Baptist theological institute in Taungoo, Bago Region approved by Association for Theological Education in Myanmar.

== History ==
It was founded in 1856 by the American Baptist Mission.

With the departure of American Baptist missionaries from Myanmar, the association has been entirely staffed by nationals. After the PKBA was reconstituted, the first executive secretary was Rev Letta. Now, PKBA has 150 churches. PKBA headquarters are in Taungoo, Bago Division. There are four regions: Bago Division East, Bago Division West, Karen States and Kayah States.

It had Paku High School, and the first headmaster was Rev Cross (ABM). Today it's No.5 Basic Education High School.

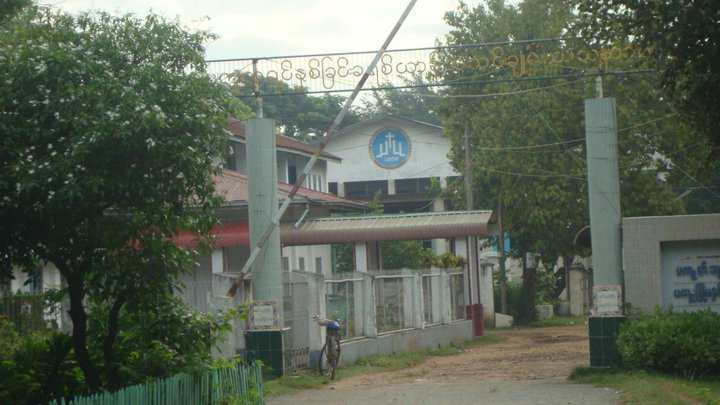
Paku Karen Baptist Association

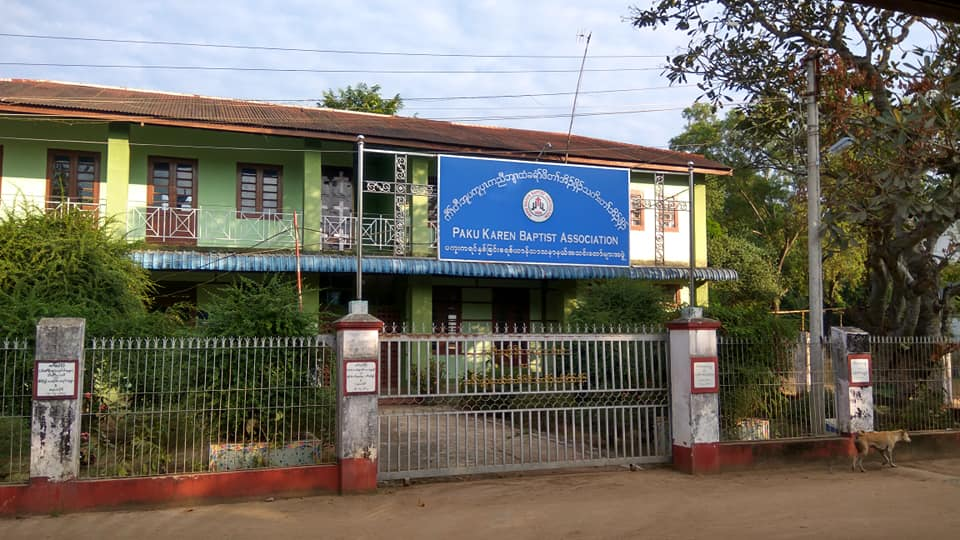
Paku Karen Baptist Association

== Executive secretaries ==
- Rev Letta (B.Th)
- Rev Kooler (B.RE)
- Rev. Dr Augustus Spurgeon (B.A (Hons) (UOT, Taungoo)), B.Th (MIT, Yangon), M.Min (TTC, Singapore), D.Min (CRCDS, USA), D.D (ULCM, USA)
- Rev Caleb Paw
- Rev Paul Htoo
- Rev Dr Nee Doh Htoo (current)

== Departments ==
- Christian Endeavour Dept (Youth Dept) (CE)
- Women Dept
- Religious Education Dept (RE)
- Evengelical and Mission Dept (E&M)
- Minsters Association Dept (MA)
- Treasury Dept
- Paku Divinity School
- Paku Christian Centre
- PCSSDD Dept (Development Dept)
- Urban Mission Dept (UM)
- PKBA Clinic (IDP Project)
- Security Department
- Facility Department

Paku Karen Baptist Association

== Compound ==
- Sesquicentennial Hall (Max Cap 1000)
- Offices
- Football field
- Staff Housing
- Paku Divinity School
- Library
- Paku Town Baptist Church
- Recreation Center
- Hall (Max Cap 400)
- Paku Christian Center
- 2 Boarders

== Fellowship ==
- Bwe Karen Baptist Association, Taungoo HQ
- Keh Ko Keh Ba Karen Baptist Association, Taungoo HQ
- "Central Myanmar Mission". Archived from the original on 2015-04-16.
- Anglican Communion: Diocese
- Diocese of Taungngu, Myanmar 🇲🇲
