= Hyattsville, Maryland =

City in Maryland, United States

- City
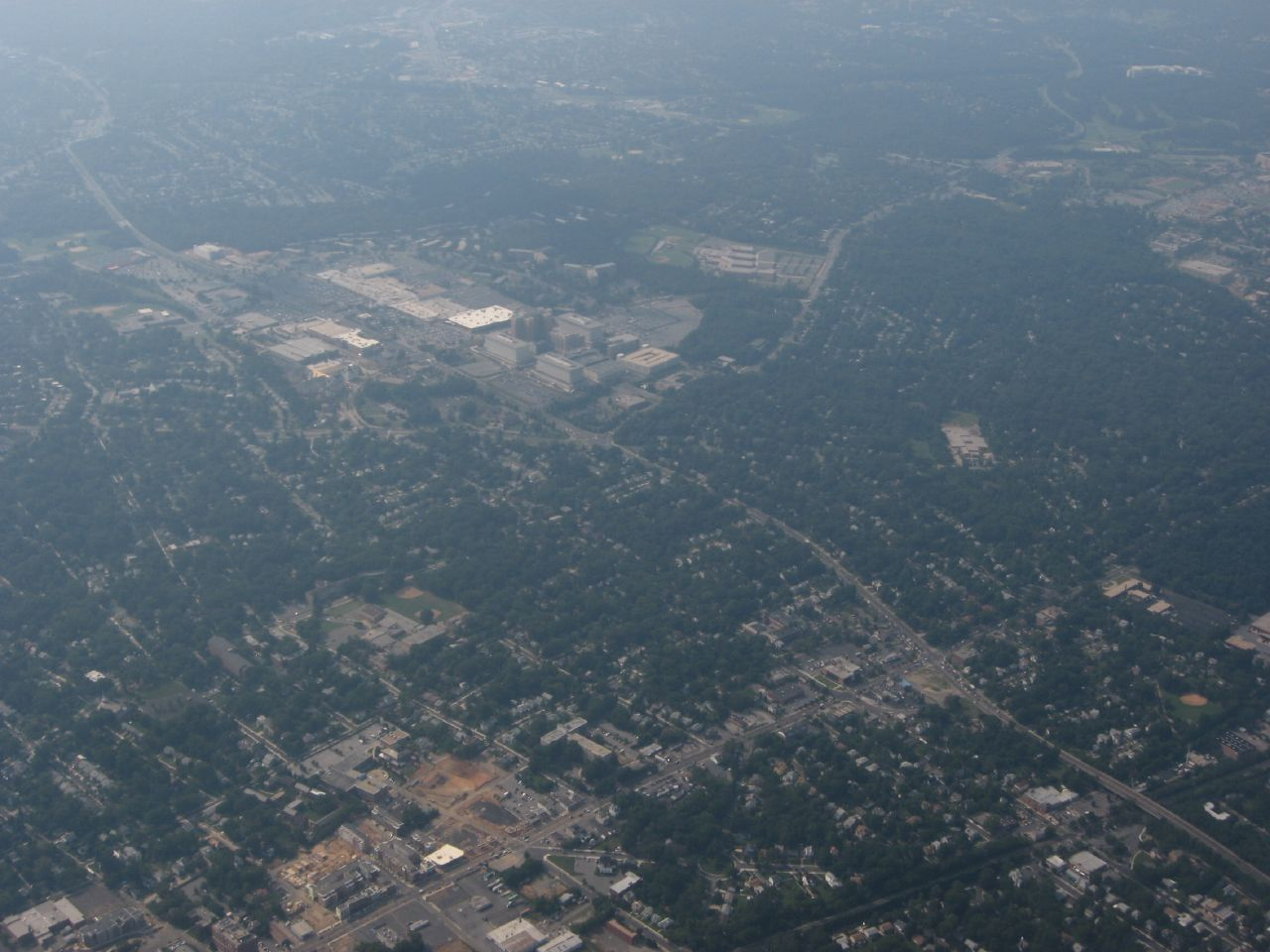
- Aerial view of Hyattsville

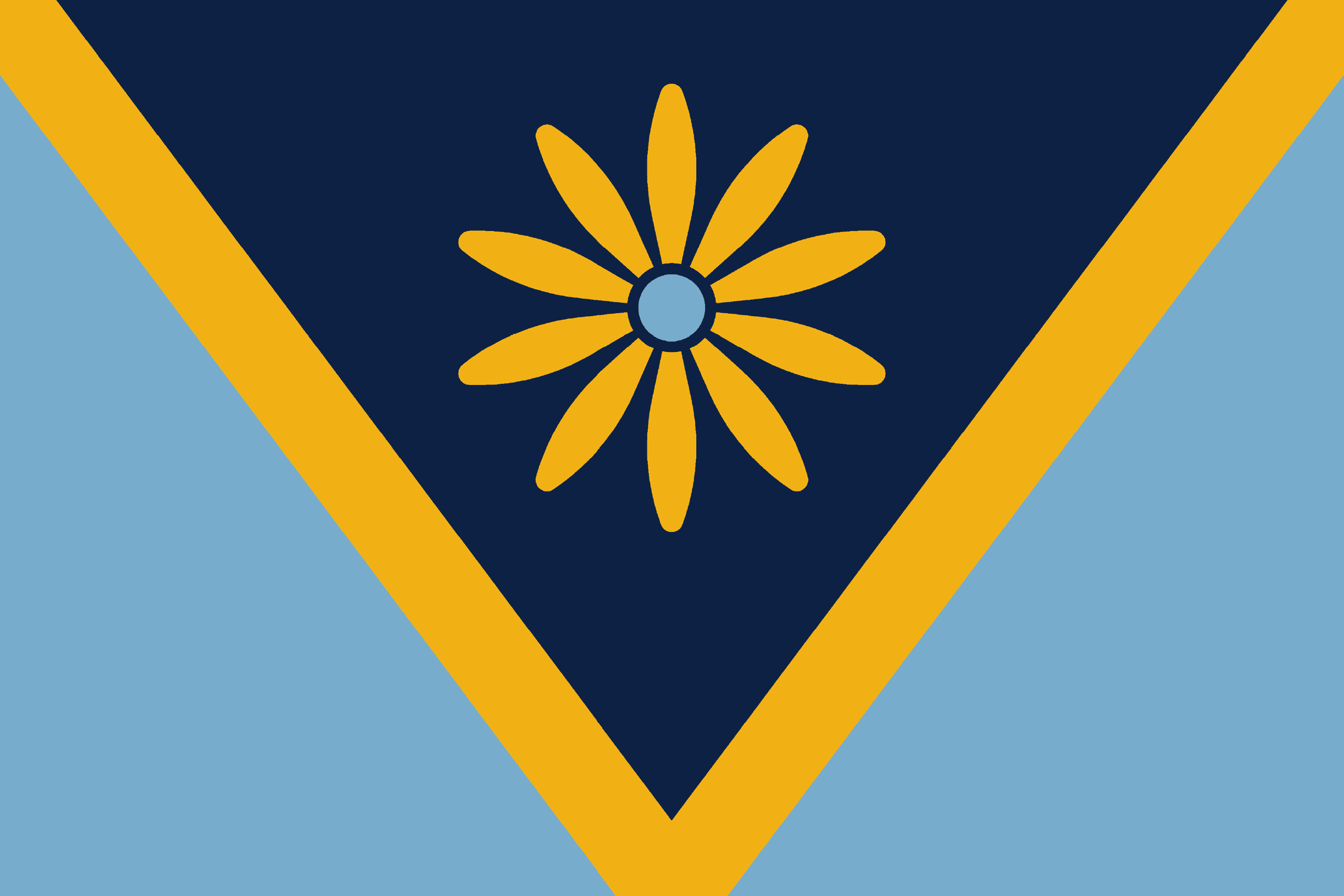
- Flag Seal
- Nickname: Hyattsville
- Motto: "A World Within Walking Distance"
- Location of Hyattsville in Maryland
- Coordinates: 38°57′25″N 76°57′5″W
- Country: United States of America
- State: Maryland
- County: Prince George's
- Incorporated: 1886

Government
  - Mayor: Robert Croslin

Area
  - Total: 2.73 sq mi (7.07 km^{2})
  - Land: 2.71 sq mi (7.01 km^{2})
  - Water: 0.027 sq mi (0.07 km^{2})
- Elevation: 105 ft (32 m)

Population (2020)
  - Total: 21,187
  - Density: 7,832.7/sq mi (3,024.22/km^{2})
- Time zone: UTC−5 (Eastern)
  - Summer (DST): UTC−4 (Eastern)
- Area codes: 301, 240
- FIPS code: 24-41250
- GNIS feature ID: 0597595
- Website: www.hyattsville.org

Hyattsville is a city in Prince George's County, Maryland, United States. It is an urban suburb of Washington, D.C. The population was 21,187 at the 2020 United States census.

== History ==
In the 1720s, John Beall acquired land in the area and established Beall Town. The opening of the Washington–Baltimore Turnpike (modern day US 1) in 1812 and the B&O Railroad Washington Branch line in 1835 brought more settlers to the area.

The city's founder, Christopher Clark Hyatt (1799–1884), purchased his first parcel of land in the area in 1845. Hyatt opened a store and began mail delivery, officially naming the nascent community "Hyattsville" in his 1859 application to become postmaster. In the years following the Civil War, Hyatt and other local landowners subdivided their properties and sold lots, and the population of Hyattsville grew. Hyattsville was incorporated as a city on April 7, 1886.

In 1893, the Hyattsville Board of Commissioners changed their property tax to only apply to the value of land, and not improvements. Opponents of this brought the action to court, and, after an appeal, the Maryland Court of Appeals found it to violate the Maryland constitution and struck it down.

=== Revitalization projects ===
Since 2000, the city has undergone a major redevelopment, including significant residential and retail development in the Arts District Hyattsville (located in the Gateway Arts District), and the area surrounding the Hyattsville Crossing station and The Mall at Prince George's. In the latter area, University Town Center contains residential condos, student housing, office buildings, a public plaza, and retail space, including a 14-screen movie theater and several restaurants, as well as a campus of Prince George's Community College.

As of 2020, additional residential and retail development is underway near the West Hyattsville Metro station. Along Route 1, craft brewers and distillers have played a notable role in revitalizing old commercial properties.

== Geography ==
The city has a total area of 2.70 square miles (6.99 km^{2}), of which 2.67 square miles (6.92 km^{2}) is land and 0.03 square miles (0.08 km^{2}) is water.

=== Climate ===
Typical of central Maryland, Hyattsville lies within the humid subtropical climate zone (Köppen: Cfa), characterized by hot humid summers and generally cool to mild winters, with high annual precipitation. Hyattsville lies within USDA plant hardiness zone 7a.

== Demographics ==
Historical population
Census	Pop.	Note	%±
1880	288		—
1890	1,509		424.0%
1900	1,222		−19.0%
1910	1,917		56.9%
1920	2,675		39.5%
1930	4,264		59.4%
1940	6,575		54.2%
1950	12,308		87.2%
1960	15,168		23.2%
1970	14,998		−1.1%
1980	12,709		−15.3%
1990	13,864		9.1%
2000	14,733		6.3%
2010	17,557		19.2%
2020	21,187		20.7%
U.S. Decennial Census

Hyattsville has attracted a significant gay and lesbian population. In 2000, same-sex couples accounted for 1.3 percent of households, more than double the national average.

=== Racial and ethnic composition ===
Hyattsville city, Maryland – Racial and ethnic composition Note: the US Census treats Hispanic/Latino as an ethnic category. This table excludes Latinos from the racial categories and assigns them to a separate category. Hispanics/Latinos may be of any race.
Race / Ethnicity (NH = Non-Hispanic)	Pop 2000	Pop 2010	Pop 2020	% 2000	% 2010	% 2020
White alone (NH)	5,095	4,206	4,657	34.58%	23.96%	21.98%
Black or African American alone (NH)	5,918	6,076	6,546	40.17%	34.61%	30.90%
Native American or Alaska Native alone (NH)	49	57	56	0.33%	0.32%	0.26%
Asian alone (NH)	582	757	769	3.95%	4.31%	3.63%
Native Hawaiian or Pacific Islander alone (NH)	5	7	6	0.03%	0.04%	0.03%
Other race alone (NH)	38	83	180	0.26%	0.47%	0.85%
Mixed race or Multiracial (NH)	373	399	787	2.53%	2.27%	3.71%
Hispanic or Latino (any race)	2,673	5,972	8,186	18.14%	34.01%	38.64%
Total	14,733	17,557	21,187	100.00%	100.00%	100.00%

=== 2020 census ===
As of the 2020 census, Hyattsville had a population of 21,187 living in 7,942 households and 8,673 housing units at an average density of 3,212.2/sq mi (1,240.2/km^{2}). The homeowner vacancy rate was 0.5% and the rental vacancy rate was 11.3%, with 8.4% of all housing units vacant.

Of all households, 31.3% had children under the age of 18 living in them; 34.3% were married-couple households, 23.7% were households with a male householder and no spouse or partner present, and 33.9% were households with a female householder and no spouse or partner present. About 31.3% of all households were made up of individuals, and 7.0% had someone living alone who was 65 years of age or older.

The median age was 33.6 years; 21.3% of residents were under 18 and 10.3% were 65 years of age or older. For every 100 females there were 94.4 males, and for every 100 females age 18 and over there were 91.9 males.

100.0% of residents lived in urban areas, while none lived in rural areas.

Racial composition as of the 2020 census
Race	Number	Percent
White	5,247	24.8%
Black or African American	6,709	31.7%
American Indian and Alaska Native	343	1.6%
Asian	787	3.7%
Native Hawaiian and Other Pacific Islander	16	0.1%
Some other race	5,701	26.9%
Two or more races	2,384	11.3%

=== 2010 census ===
As of the 2010 U.S. census, there were 17,557 people, 6,324 households, and 3,724 families residing in the city. The population density was 6,575.7 inhabitants per square mile (2,538.9/km^{2}). There were 6,837 housing units at an average density of 2,560.7/sq mi (988.7/km^{2}). The racial makeup of the city was 33.2% White, 35.6% African American, 0.8% Native American, 4.4% Asian, 0.1% Pacific Islander, 21.4% from other races, and 4.6% from two or more races. Hispanic or Latino of any race were 34.0% of the population (16.4% Salvadorean, 4.1% Mexican, 3.1% Guatemalan, 1.2% Honduran, 1.1% Dominican, 0.8% Puerto Rican).

There were 6,324 households, of which 33.2% had children under the age of 18 living with them, 36.4% were married couples living together, 15.7% had a female householder with no husband present, 6.8% had a male householder with no wife present, and 41.1% were non-families. 31.0% of all households were made up of individuals, and 6.7% had someone living alone who was 65 years of age or older. The average household size was 2.73 and the average family size was 3.39.

The median age in the city was 32.1 years. 22.2% of residents were under the age of 18; 12.6% were between the ages of 18 and 24; 34.7% were from 25 to 44; 23.2% were from 45 to 64; and 7.2% were 65 years of age or older. The gender makeup of the city was 50.8% male and 49.2% female.

=== Crime ===
According to FBI crime statistics, the violent crime rate per 1,000 residents has significantly decreased in Hyattsville, from 11.42 in 2007 to 4.64 in 2019.

== Economy ==
The National Center for Health Statistics, part of the Department of Health and Human Services, is headquartered in Hyattsville.

== Arts and culture ==
=== Historic sites ===
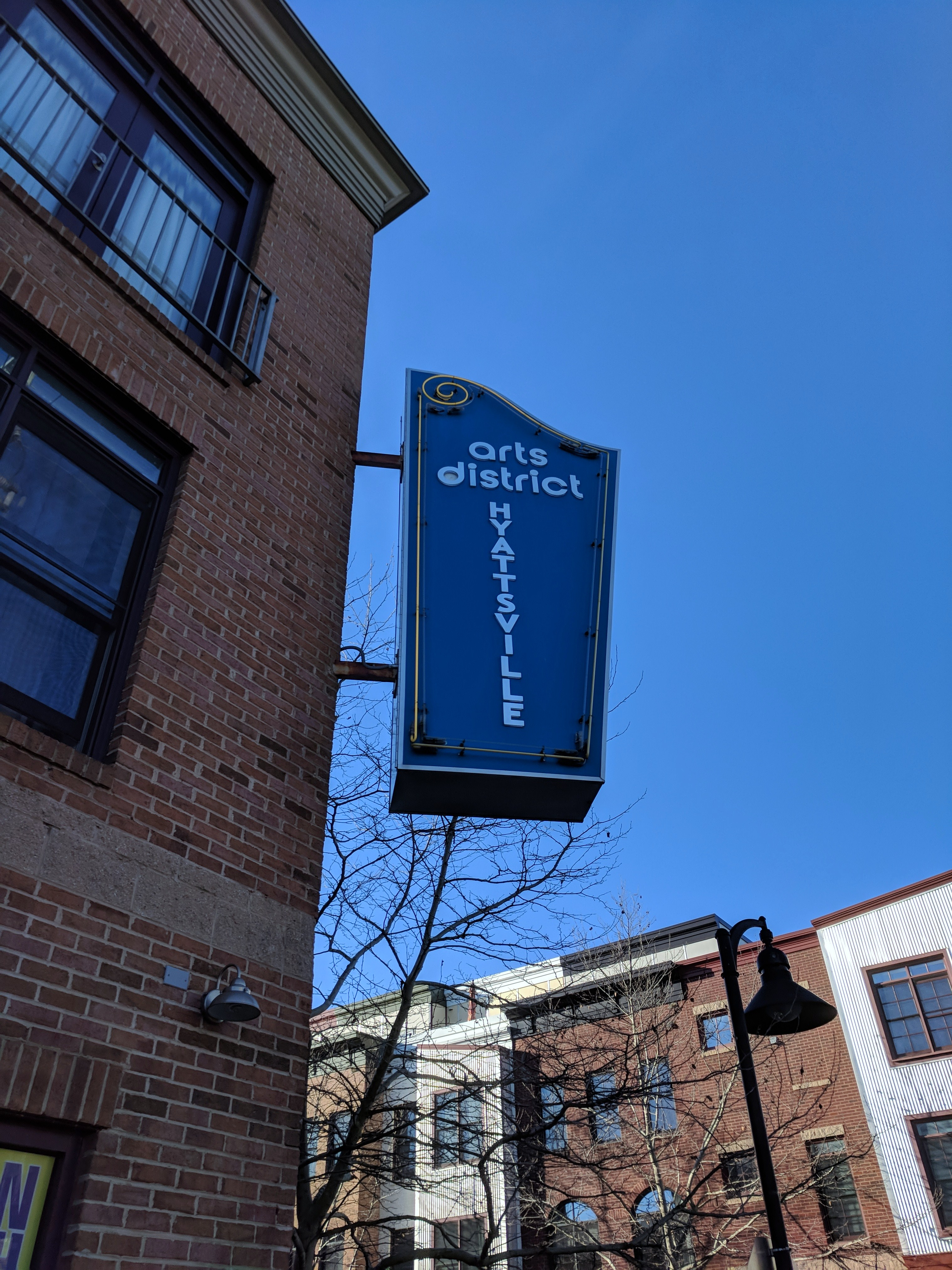
A sign marks the Hyattsville Arts District, which includes newly built townhomes.

Some historic sites in Hyattsville are listed on the Maryland-National Capital Park and Planning Commission and the National Register of Historic Places. In 1982, a portion of the city was placed on the National Register of Historic Places as the Hyattsville Historic District, which was extended in late 2004.

The Hyattsville Historic District is home to Victorian houses built in the late 1880s and Sears bungalows and Arts & Crafts houses built between the wars (late 1910s and early 1940s).

Notable historic sites include Hyattsville Armory and the Hyattsville Main Post Office.

=== Arts District ===
Downtown Hyattsville underwent revitalization in the early 2000s with the development of the Arts District Hyattsville, part of the Gateway Arts District, a private project which includes townhomes, live-work units, and retail space.

Pyramid Atlantic Art Center, a nonprofit arts center, is located in the historic arcade building in Hyattsville.

=== Public libraries ===
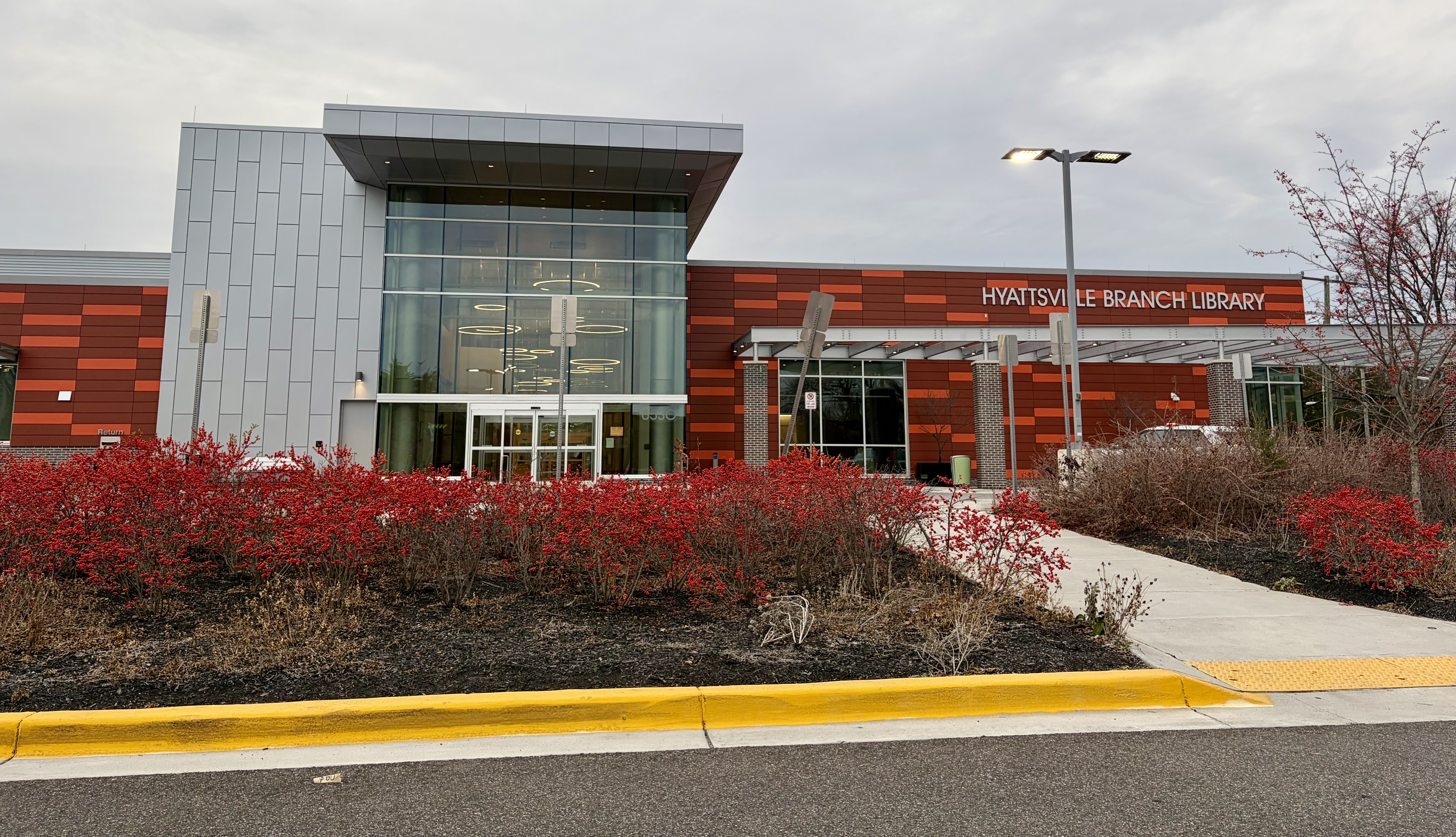
Hyattsville Branch Library

Prince George's County Memorial Library System (PGCMLS) operates the Hyattsville Branch Library, which in 1964 was the first county-built library building for PGCMLS. The original mid-century modern building featured a googie-style flying saucer entryway.

== Government ==
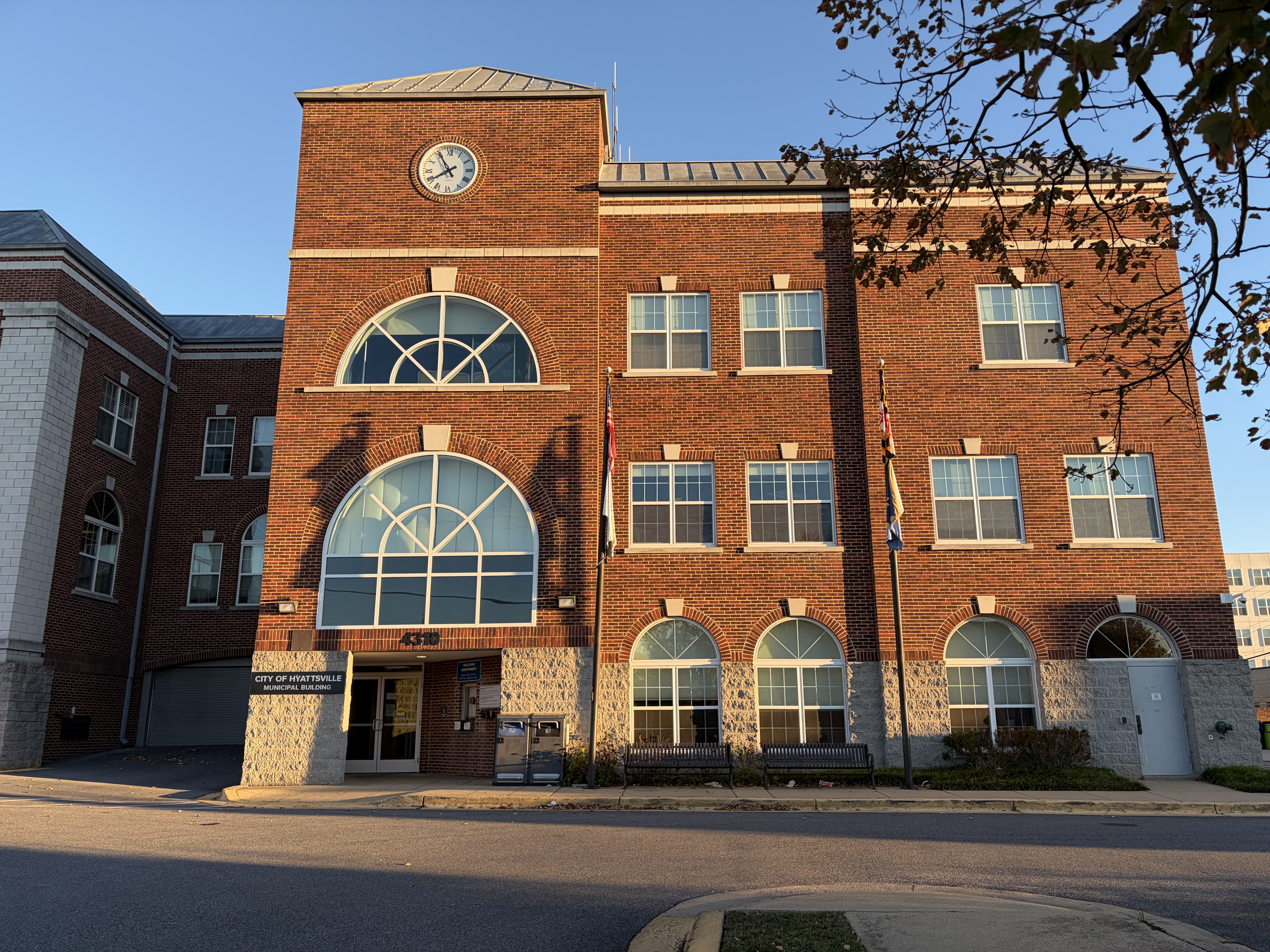
The Hyattsville Municipal Building, the home of the city’s administrative offices and police headquarters.

In January 2015, the Hyattsville Council passed a charter amendment to reduce the voting age to 16 for city elections, making Hyattsville one of the few jurisdictions in the United States that has done so. In December 2016, the city expanded voting rights again, granting non-citizen residents the right to vote in municipal elections.

== Education ==
=== Public schools ===
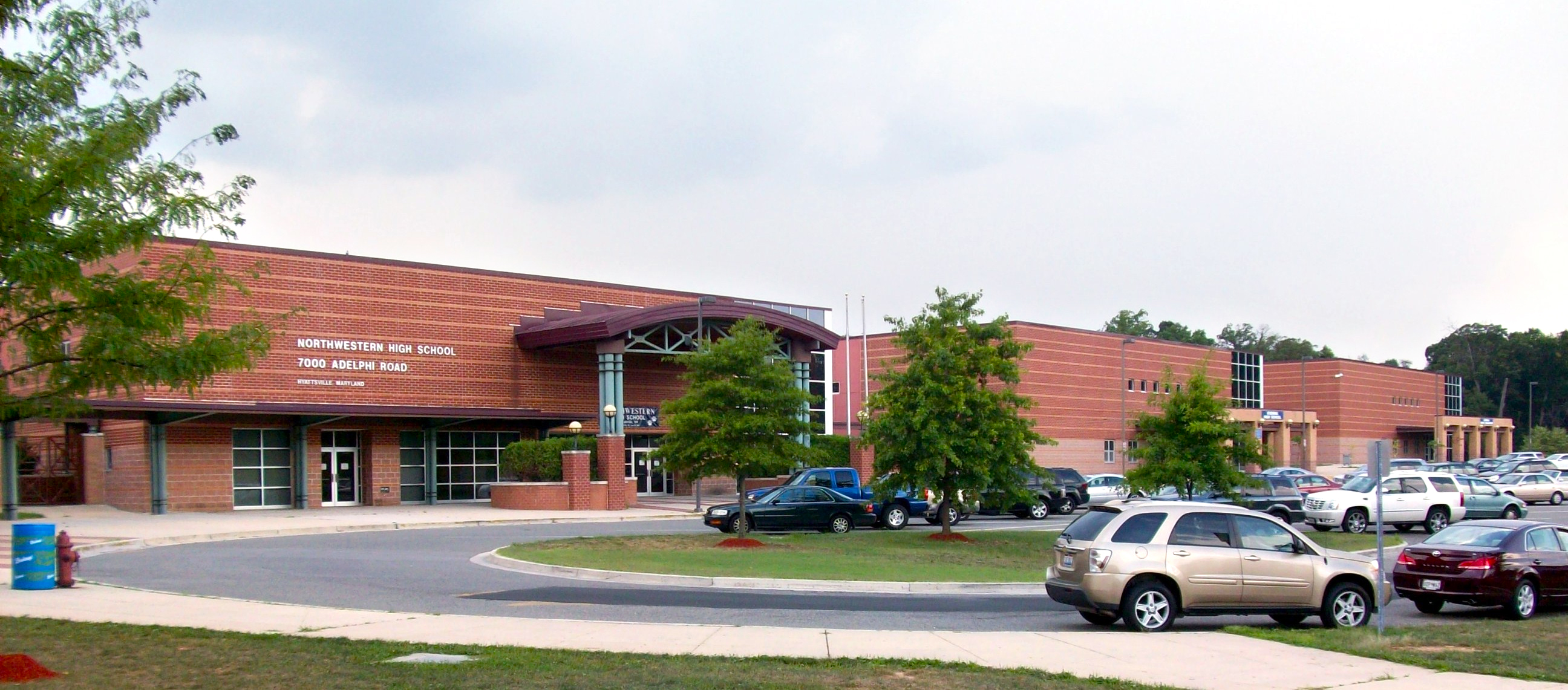
Northwestern High School.

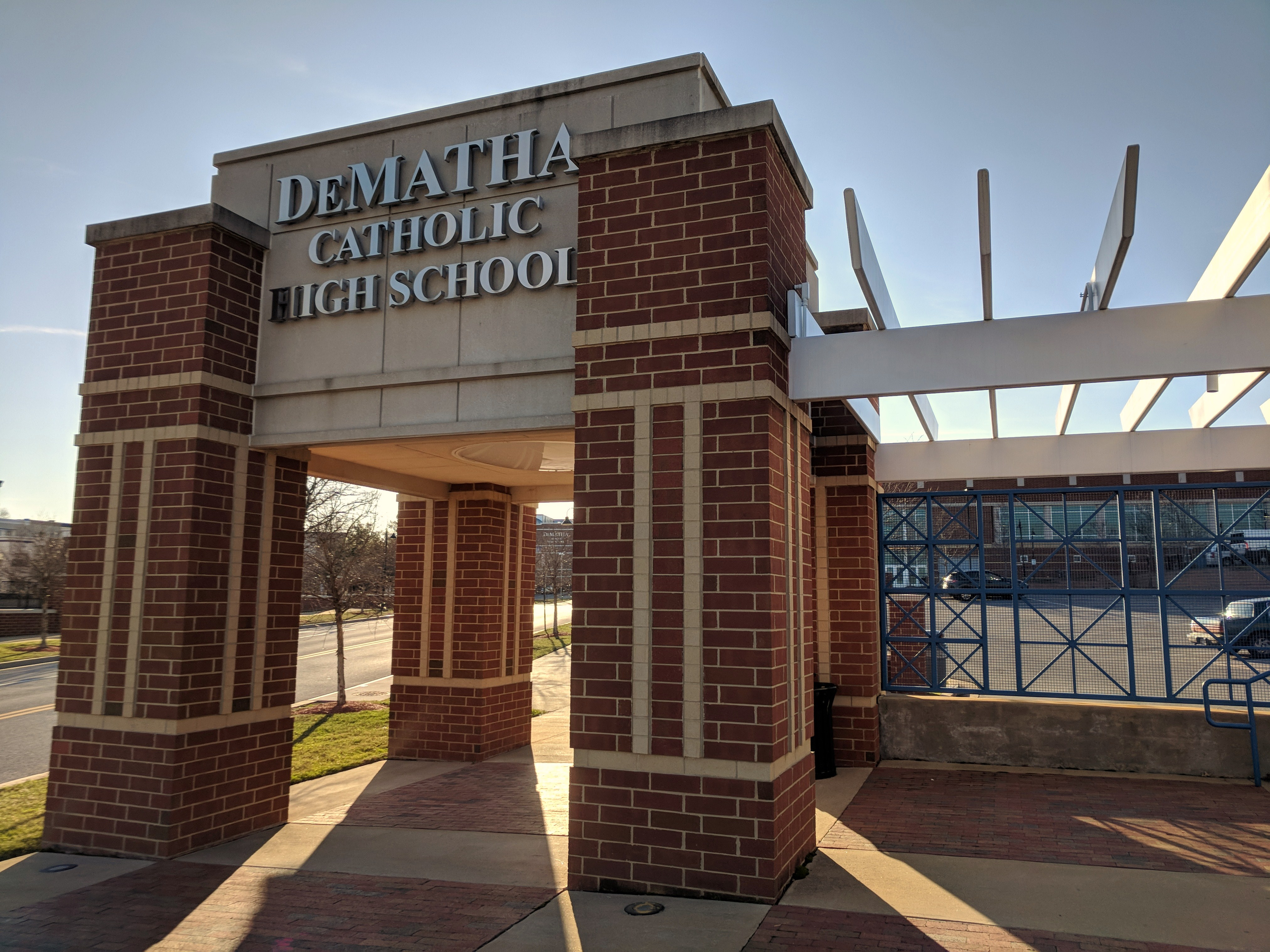
DeMatha Catholic High School.

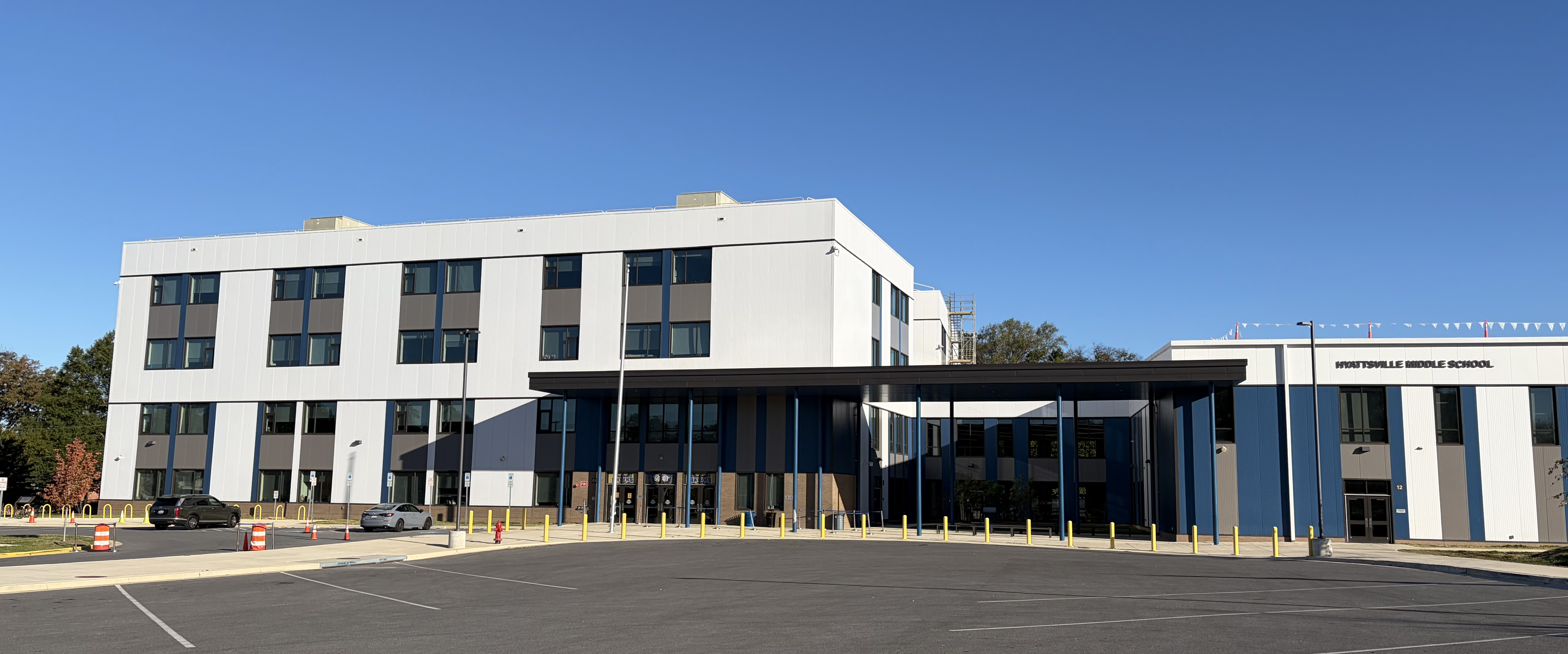
Hyattsville Middle School.

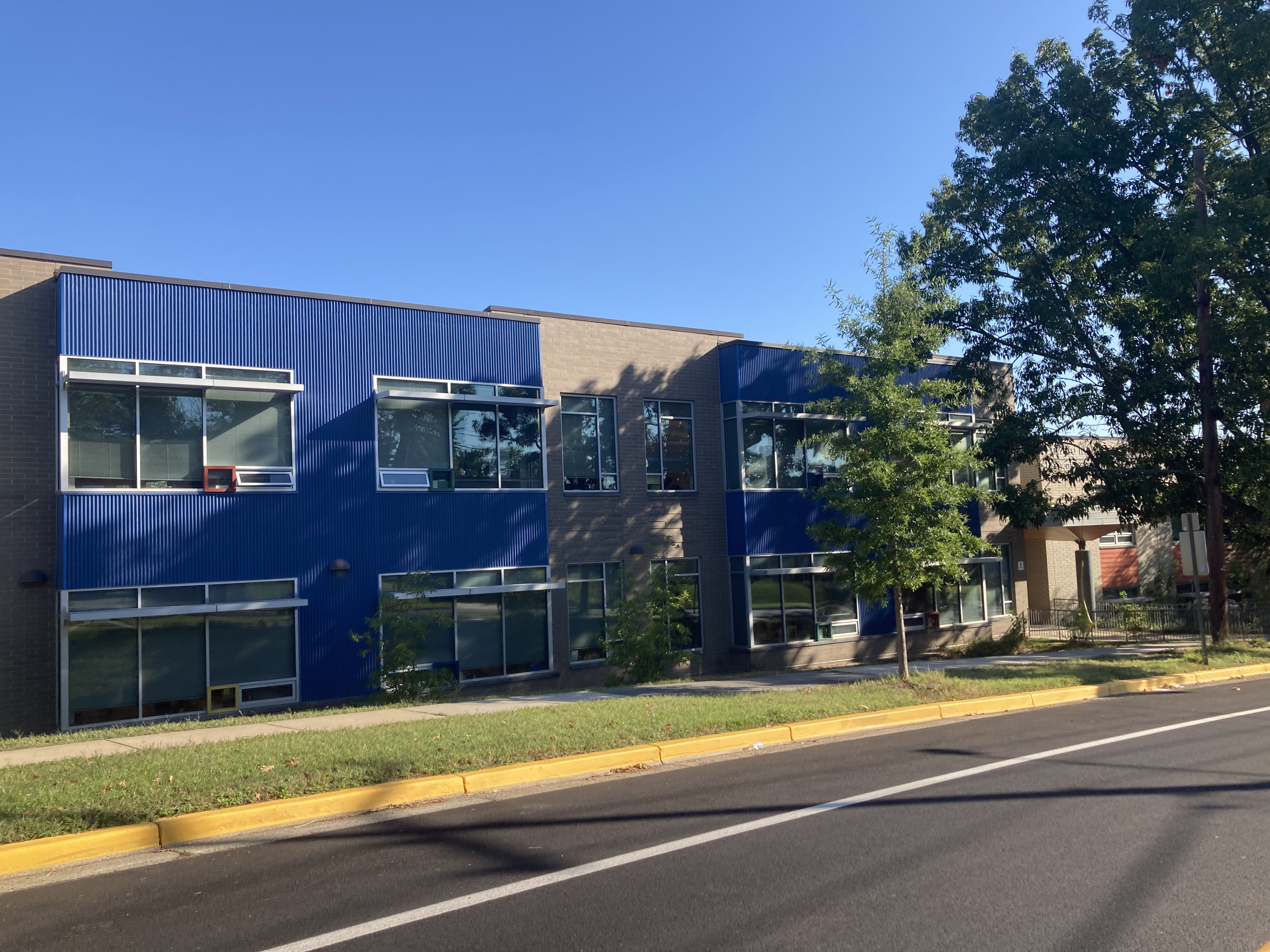
Edward M. Felegy Elementary School in Hyattsville.

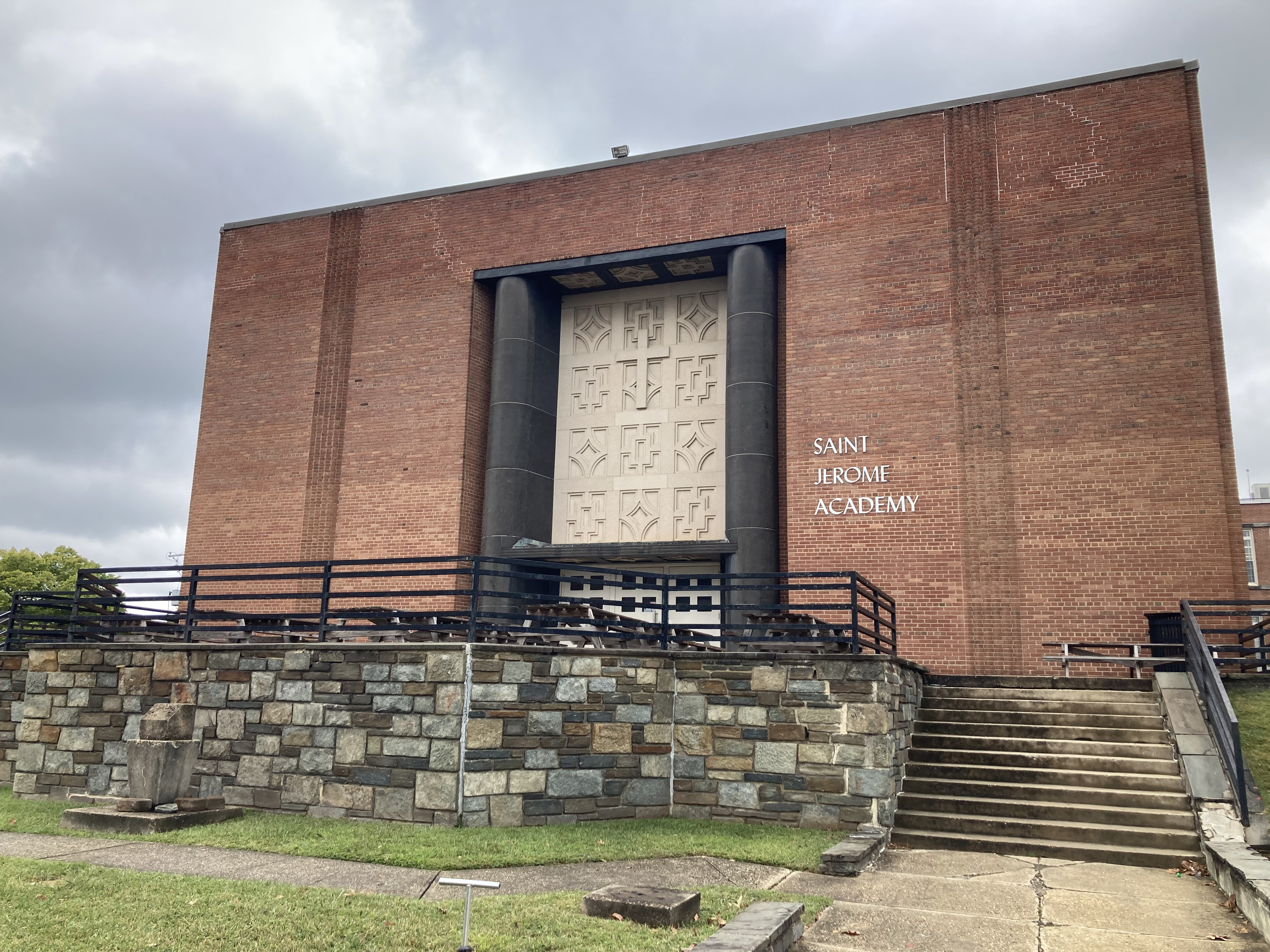
Saint Jerome Academy, a K-8 classical, Catholic parochial school in Hyattsville.

Hyattsville Elementary, Felegy Elementary, Hyattsville Middle, and Northwestern High School, along with the Chelsea School, St. Matthews, DeMatha, and St. Jerome Academy are located within the city limits.

The city is served by Prince George's County Public Schools, and its borders overlap with the enrollment areas for the following public schools:

- Hyattsville Elementary School
- Edward M. Felegy Elementary School
- Rosa Parks Elementary School
- University Park Elementary School
- Rogers Heights Elementary School
- Hyattsville Middle School
- Nicholas Orem Middle School
- William Wirt Middle School
- Northwestern High School
- Bladensburg High School

During the era of legally-required racial segregation of schools, black students from Hyattsville attended Lakeland High School in College Park in the period 1928–1950. Fairmont Heights High School, then near Fairmount Heights, replaced Lakeland High and served black students only from 1950 to 1964. During 1964, legally-required racial segregation of schools ended.

==== Private schools ====
- Chelsea School (5–12) for students with language-based learning disabilities and ADD/ADHD
- DeMatha Catholic High School (9–12)
- St. Francis International School (Catholic) (K–8) (St. Mark the Evangelist Campus)—As of 2013 it is primarily used for summer programs and athletics, with classes held in the Silver Spring campus.
  - Formerly St. Mark the Evangelist School, closed and merged into Saint Francis International, which opened in 2010. Beginning in 2013 College Park Academy (CPA) leased the St. Francis building; in 2017 CPA moved to its permanent Riverdale Park campus.
- St. Jerome Academy (Catholic) (Pre-K–8)
- St. Matthew's Parish Day School (Episcopal) (Pre-K–K)

=== Colleges and universities ===
Prince George's Community College has an extension center in University Town Center.

== Infrastructure ==
=== Transportation ===
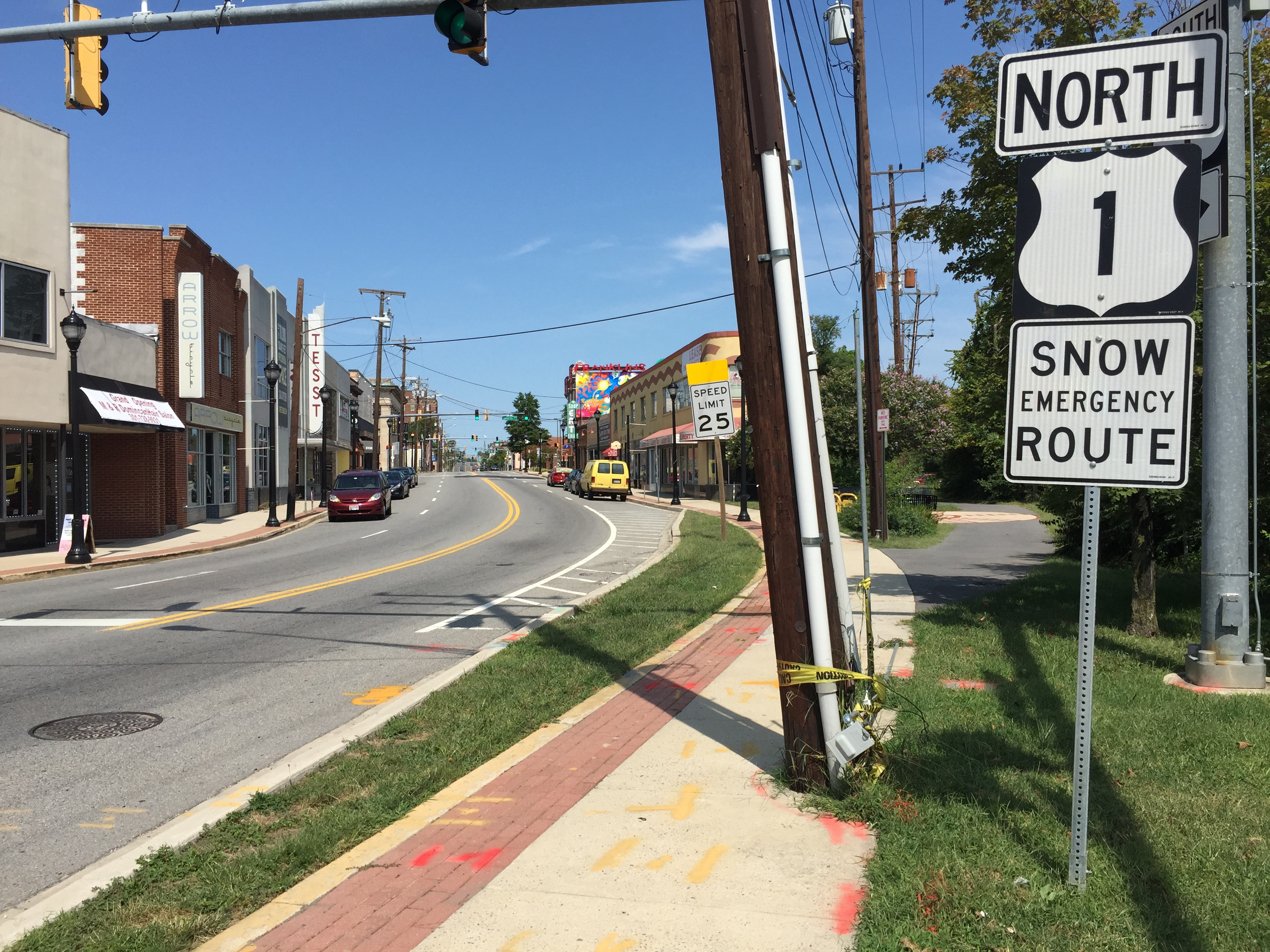
US 1 northbound in Hyattsville. The Trolley Trail trailhead can be seen at the right.

==== Public transportation ====
The Hyattsville Crossing and West Hyattsville Metro station both serve Hyattsville. Hyattsville is also served by the Riverdale MARC commuter train station, as well as a few Metrobus and TheBus routes. Students and staff at the University of Maryland have access to the free Shuttle–UM bus that goes from historic Hyattsville to the University of Maryland campus in College Park.

==== Bikeways ====
Hyattsville is well connected to the regional Anacostia Tributary Trail System network of hiker–biker trails, including the Northwest Branch Trail, which runs along the southern and western sides of the city, and the Rhode Island Avenue Trolley Trail. Numerous city streets include bicycle sharrows, along with a few unprotected bike lanes. Capital Bikeshare has eight bikeshare stations within the city.

=== Law enforcement ===
Prince George's County Police Department District 1 Station in Hyattsville serves areas outside of the city that are not located in an incorporated municipality that maintains its own police department.

In 2017, the Hyattsville City Police Department became the first law enforcement agency in the United States to put a Chevrolet Bolt (all-electric) fully marked police patrol vehicle into service. It has since added an all-electric police motorcycle, and six public electric vehicle charging stations, which are free to use by the public.

== Notable people ==
- Emilie Ballard, World War II Army nurse, missionary to Myanmar and Thailand, and S'gaw Karen language expert
- David Driskell, artist, curator and professor of art at the University of Maryland, was a resident of Hyattsville
- Parris Glendening, Maryland governor (1995-2003), began his political career as a member of Hyattsville City Council
- Arthur Frederick Goode III, murderer who killed two children in the mid 1970s, born in Hyattsville
- Anne Healey, Maryland House of Delegates (District 22), former Hyattsville City Council member
- Robert B. Luckey, Marine Corps lieutenant general, born in Hyattsville
- John C. Mather, Nobel laureate in physics, Hyattsville resident
- Jamie McGonnigal, voice actor and activist
- Paul Rabil, Major League Lacrosse player, attended high school in Hyattsville
- Kameron Taylor (born 1994), basketball player for Maccabi Tel Aviv in the Israeli Basketball Premier League and the EuroLeague
- Frances Tiafoe (born 1998), professional tennis player
- Chase Young, American football player, graduate of DeMatha

== In popular culture ==
The city was involved in a minor controversy in April 2006. In the episode airing April 27, the Geena Davis television series Commander in Chief depicted Hyattsville as having twelve murders in six months, and was accused of depicting Hyattsville as an urban ghetto dominated by poor minorities. On May 1, ABC formally apologized to both the city and county.
