= Emilie Ballard =

American Baptist missionary (1919–2024)

Emilie Margaret Ballard (July 21, 1919 – September 22, 2024) was an American Baptist missionary to the Karen who served in Burma and Thailand.

== Early life and education ==
Emilie Margaret Ballard was born in Hyattsville, Maryland on July 21, 1919. She pursued a Bachelor of Science in Nursing at the University of Maryland, responding to the needs of World War II by serving in the United States Army Nurse Corps. Following her service, she enrolled at Eastern Baptist Theological Seminary, where she earned a Master of Religious Education with a focus on missions.

== Mission to the Karen ==
Ballard then began over 40 years of service with the American Baptist Foreign Mission Societies (now International Ministries), working primarily with the Karen people in the Bassein-Myaungmya Sgaw Karen Baptist Association, Burma, and later in Thailand. In 1950, she joined the mission staff at Yedwinyegan, a village in the Irrawaddy Delta region of Burma. There she trained nurses and did evangelism and literacy work, gaining fluency in three languages in order to serve the local people. During a furlough after leaving Burma in 1966, she furthered her theological education with a term at Fuller Theological Seminary.

After retiring in 1989 and completing a year of deputation, she returned to Thailand for three more years at the Mission's request, to the Sangkla Christian Mission (later called the Kwai River Christian Mission) in Kanchanaburi Province. During this time, she developed language lessons to assist new missionaries in learning the S'gaw Karen language, including the three-volume textbook series "Say it in Karen" (books I–III) and "Introduction to Say it in Karen: How to read and write Sgaw Karen".

In 2003, when Ko Tha Byu Theological Seminary in Pathein, Myanmar (formerly Bassein, Burma), was first authorized to confer Doctor of Divinity degrees, Emilie Ballard was one of three honorees recognized for their contributions.

== Later life and death ==
Later, she moved to the Pilgrim Place Retirement Community in Claremont, California, where she remained active in service through her church and local community. In 2014, she published her memoir, God's Hand upon Me, which was named AuthorHouse's Book of the Year. Her second book, titled Learning to Be a Missionary in the Land of the Golden Pagodas, was published in 2018. Ballard died in Claremont on September 22, 2024, at the age of 105.

Her papers are deposited in the American Baptist Historical Society Collection at Mercer University.

== See also ==
- List of Protestant Missionaries to Southeast Asia
