= Hyattsville Historic District =

Historic district in Maryland, United States

- U.S. National Register of Historic Places
- U.S. Historic district
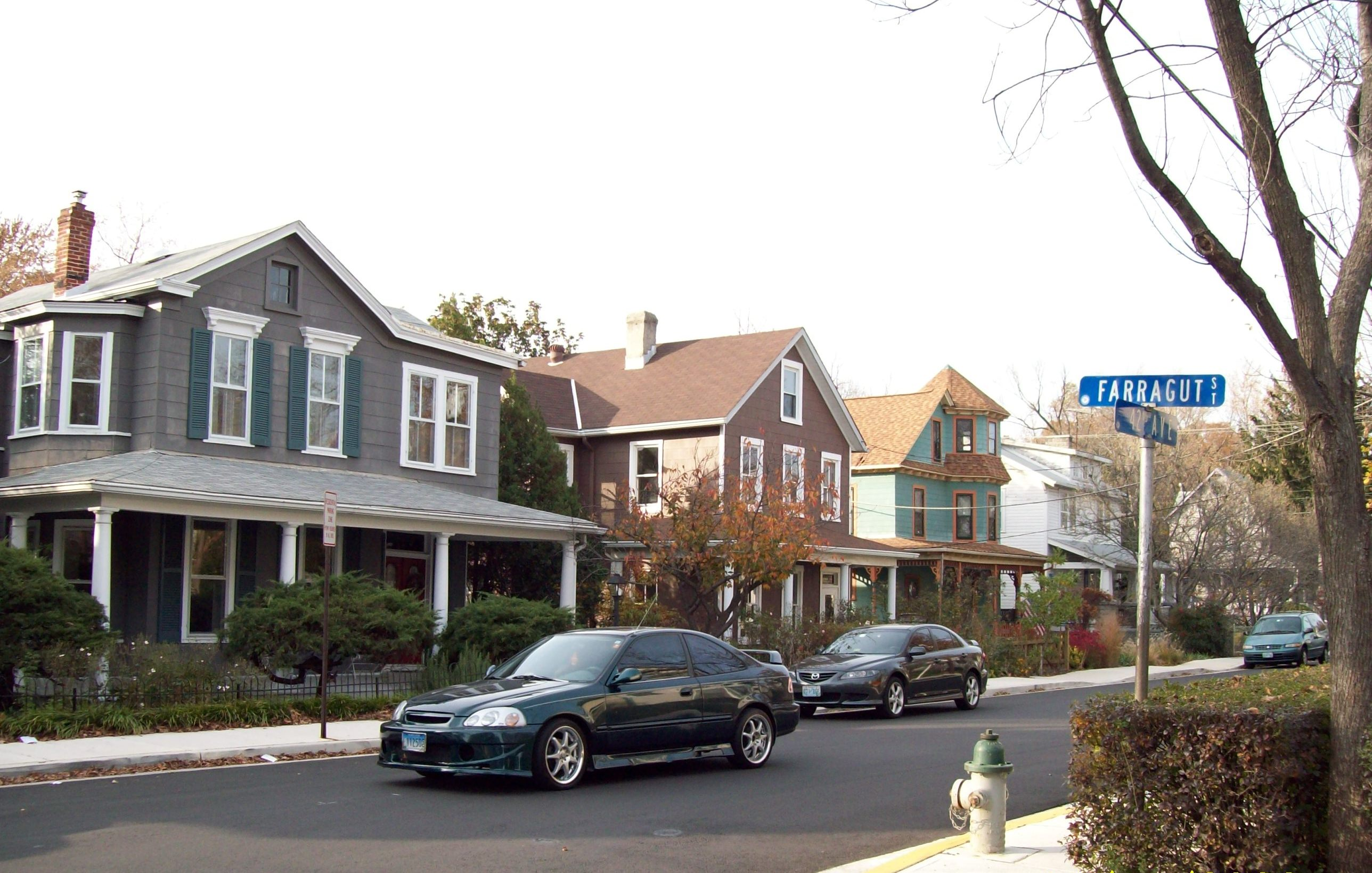
- A Typical Street in the Hyattsville Historic District November 2008

- Location within Maryland Location within the United States
- Location: Roughly bounded by B&O RR Tracks, East-West Hwy, 42nd Pl., Madison,37th,38th Ave, Hamilton, and 37th Pl., Hyattsville, Maryland
- Coordinates: 38°57′20″N 76°56′51″W
- Area: 627.6 acres (254.0 ha)
- Built: 1873
- Architect: Kea, Paul H. & Cutler, Howard; et al.
- Architectural style: Bungalow/Craftsman, Late Victorian, Queen Anne, Late 19th And 20th Century Revivals
- NRHP reference No.: 82004682 (original); 04001356 (increase)
- Added to NRHP: March 25, 1982 (original), December 15, 2004 (increase)

The Hyattsville Historic District is a residential neighborhood comprising a national historic district located in the city of Hyattsville, Prince George's County, Maryland. The district comprises approximately 600 structures, primarily houses, that exhibit late-19th- and early-20th-century design characteristics. The majority of residential buildings are of frame construction, the older ones with foundations of brick or (rarely) fieldstone, the newer of concrete. The architectural styles represented: grand "mansions," summer cottages, duplexes, Second Empire, Queen Anne, Italianate, Victorian, Bungalow, and Spanish. The area also includes numerous vernacular buildings. The finest concentration of late-19th-century structures occur in the area of Farragut, Gallatin, and Hamilton streets and 42nd Avenue. The early-20th century hipped-roof style and bungalows are found throughout the district.

It was listed on the National Register of Historic Places in 1982. The district was expanded in 2004.
