= Hyattsville Armory =

- U.S. National Register of Historic Places
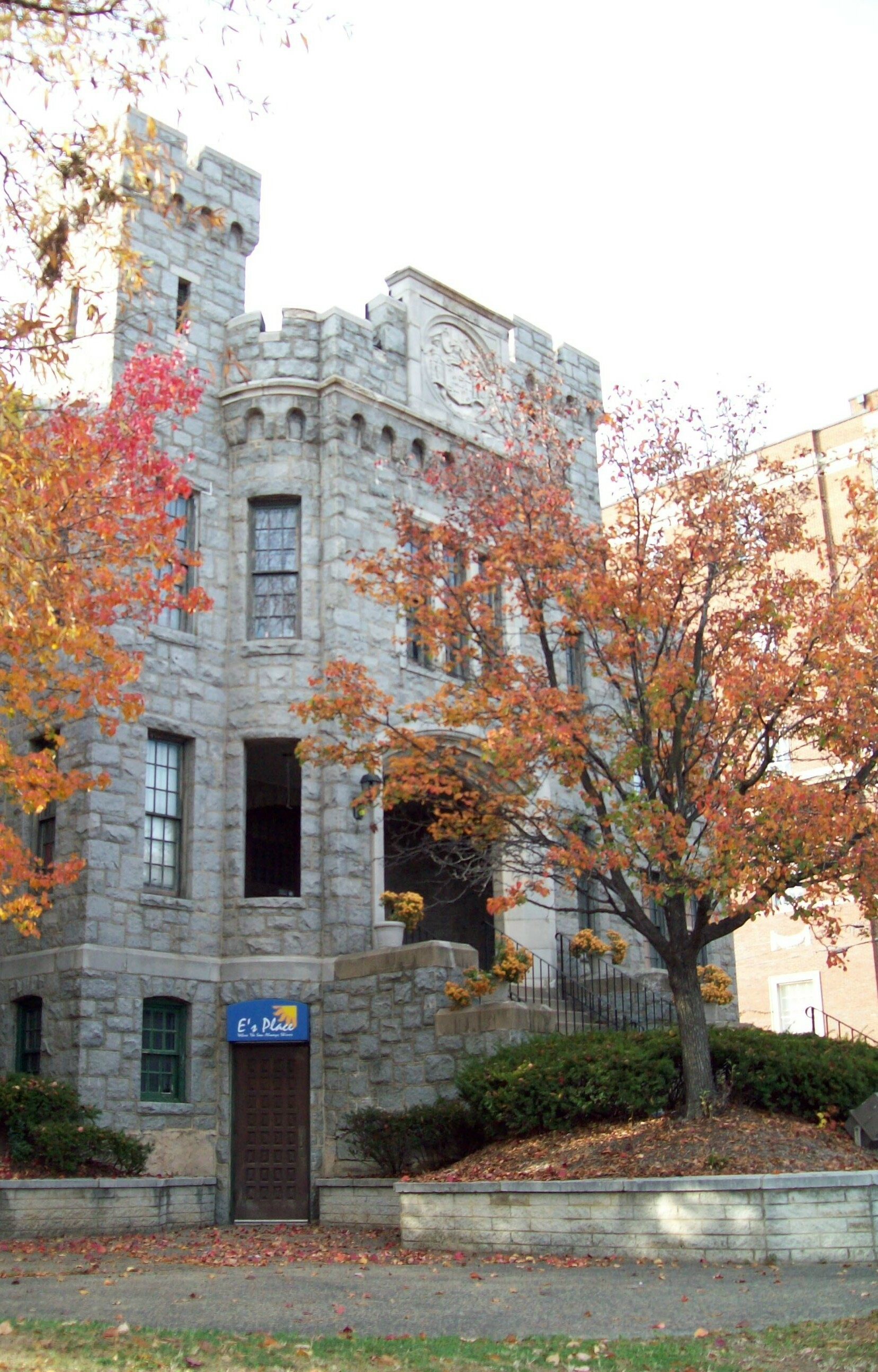
- Side View of Hyattsville Armory November 2008

- Location within Maryland Location within the United States
- Location: 5340 Baltimore Ave., Hyattsville, Maryland
- Coordinates: 38°57′17″N 76°56′28″W
- Built: 1918
- Architect: Robert Lawrence Harris
- NRHP reference No.: 80004332
- Added to NRHP: March 27, 1980

The Hyattsville Armory is a historic National Guard armory built in 1918 and located in Hyattsville, Prince George's County, Maryland, United States. It was the first Armory built in Prince George's County and the fifth in Maryland. Its architect, Robert Lawrence Harris, served as State Architect under Governor Albert C. Ritchie. In this capacity, Harris supervised the design of similar armories in Salisbury, Kensington, Silver Spring, Hagerstown, Laurel, Easton, Crisfield, Pocomoke City, Centreville, and Cumberland. The structure is distinctly fortresslike and offers a commanding view of the surrounding area. The building is patterned after a medieval English castle and built of native stone, with rectangular turrets flanking the arched limestone entranceway. Carved above the entry is the State Seal of Maryland.

The Hyattsville Armory was listed on the National Register of Historic Places in 1980.

== Gallery ==
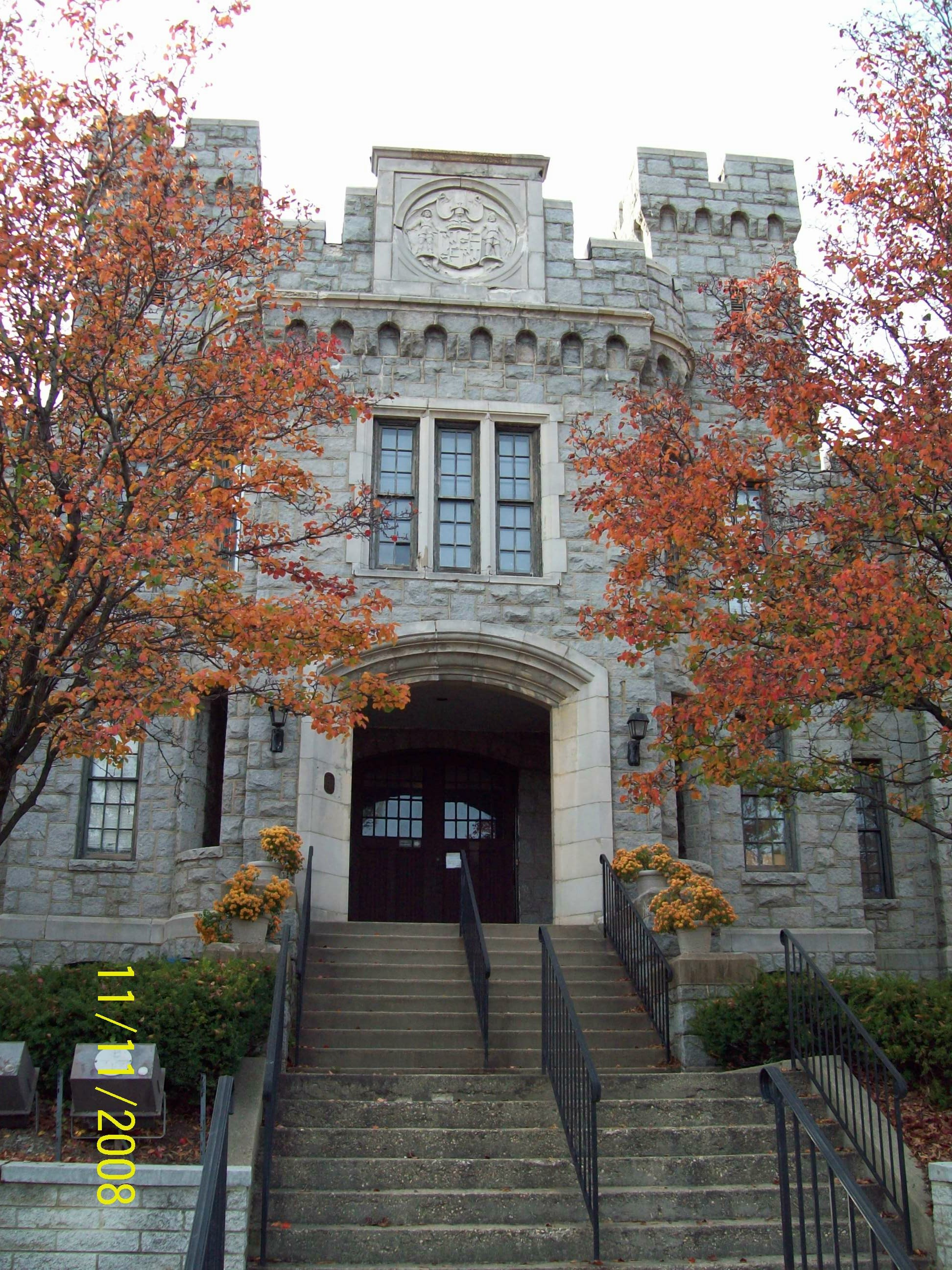
Entrance to the Hyattsville Armory November 2008
