= S'gaw Karen language =

Sino-Tibetan language of Myanmar and Thailand

S'gaw Karen
- ကညီကျိာ်, K'nyaw
- Pronunciation: [sɣɔʔ]
- Native to: Myanmar, Thailand
- Region: Kayin State, Myanmar; Thailand; Andaman and Nicobar Islands, India; Malaysia
- Ethnicity: Karen
- Native speakers: 2.2 million (2010–2017)
- Language family: Sino-Tibetan: Tibeto-Burman; Karenic; S'gaw Karen
- Writing system: Mon–Burmese (S'gaw Karen alphabet); Latin script Karen Braille

Official status
- Official language in: Myanmar (Kayin State)
- Recognised minority language in: Thailand

Language codes
- ISO 639-2: kar
- ISO 639-3: ksw – inclusive code Individual codes: ksw – S'gaw jkp – Paku jkm – Mopwa wea – Wewaw
- Glottolog: sout1554
- Karen languages

S'gaw Karen or S'gaw K'nyaw, commonly known simply as Karen, is a Sino-Tibetan language spoken by the S'gaw Karen people of Myanmar and Thailand. A Karenic branch of the Sino-Tibetan language family, S'gaw Karen is spoken by over 2 million people in Tanintharyi Region, Ayeyarwady Region, Yangon Region, and Bago Region in Myanmar, and about 200,000 in northern and western Thailand along the border near Kayin State. It is written using the S'gaw Karen alphabet, derived from the Burmese script, although a Latin-based script is also in use among the S'gaw Karen in northwestern Thailand. Additionally, the Kwekor script is used in Hlaingbwe Township.

Various divergent dialects are sometimes seen as separate languages: Paku in the northeast, Mopwa (Mobwa) in the northwest, Wewew, and Monnepwa.

== History ==
S'gaw belongs to the Karenic branch of the Sino-Tibetan language family. The S'gaw language has been used as the official language in the Kayin State of Myanmar and of the Karen National Union (KNU) organization who have waged a war against the Burmese government since early 1949. A Bible translation was published in 1853. The first issue of the Karen-language monthly periodical, The Morning Star (Hsa Too Ghaw), was published in 1842.

Christian missionaries, from the 19th century onward, have had a profound and lasting impact on the S'gaw Karen language, especially in the areas of literacy, orthography, and education. Jonathan Wade, an American Baptist missionary, is credited with developing the first written script for the S'gaw Karen language in 1831–1832, adapting the Mon–Burmese script to fit S'gaw Karen phonology. Another American Baptist missionary, Francis Mason, led the work of producing the first translation of the Bible into S'gaw Karen. The full S'gaw Karen Bible was completed in 1853, becoming one of the earliest and most widely read texts in the language. The Bible and other texts helped standardize vocabulary and orthography and provided a basis for literacy instruction. With a newly-devised script and a growing body of texts, missionaries established schools and seminaries that taught reading and writing in S'gaw Karen, often alongside English and Burmese. As a result, literacy rates among Christian Karen rose, and S'gaw Karen gained prestige as a language of education and religion. Additionally, they compiled grammars, dictionaries, and textbooks, documenting the S'gaw Karen language in ways that were previously nonexistent. These linguistic resources continue to be used today in both academic research and community-based education. Missionaries working particularly on the S'gaw Karen language include Jonathan Wade, Francis Mason, and Emilie Ballard.

== Distribution and varieties ==
S'gaw is spoken in the Ayeyarwady delta area, in the Ayeyarwady, Bago, Kayin, and Rangon Regions. S'gaw speakers are frequently interspersed with Pwo Karen speakers.

S'gaw dialects are:

- Eastern dialect of S'gaw (Pa'an)
- Southern dialect of Western Kayah (Dawei)
- Delta dialect of S'gaw

Paku is spoken in:

- northern Kayin State: hills southeast of Taungoo in eastern Bago Region, bordering Kayin State
- southern Kayah State (also known as Karenni State).

Paku dialects are Shwe Kyin, Mawchi, Kyauk Gyi, Bawgali, the names of which are based on villages.

- Kyauk Gyi and Shwe Kyin are spoken in Taungoo District, eastern Bago Region, near the Kayin State border.
- Mawchi is spoken in Kayah State.
- Bawgali is spoken in north Kayin State.

Mobwa is spoken in 9 villages at the western foot of the Thandaung Mountains in Thandaung township, Kayin State. There are also some in Taungoo township, Bago Region.

Mobwa dialects are Palaychi (Southern Mobwa) and Dermuha (Southern Mobwa).

Karen people in the Andaman Islands: S'gaw Karen is also spoken in the Andaman and Nicobar Islands, Union Territory of India. The total population in the Andamans is about 2000 people, living in eight villages in the Mayabunder and Diglipur tehsils of the North and Middle Andaman district:

- Mayabunder tehsil – Webi, Deopur, Lataw, Lucknow (Burmadera), Karmatang-9 and 10
- Diglipur tehsil – Borang, Chipon

== Dialects ==
The S'gaw Karen language has at least 3 dialects. They are mutually intelligible to each other; however, there may be words that sound unfamiliar to one another.

- Northern dialect – also known as southern dialect of Kayah State is the S'gaw dialect that does not have the th sound in their language or dialect. They replace the southern and eastern dialects th with s. For example: while the southern and eastern would say moe tha boe, the northern dialect would say moe sa boe. This dialect used the Roman alphabet for their writing system.
- Southern dialect and Eastern (Pa'an) dialect – these two dialects are very similar but there may be words that each may not understand due to regional location which allowed the dialects to grow apart. These two dialects use the Myanmar script as their writing system.
- There are also different accents in the Karen language.

== Phonology ==
The following displays the phonological features of present S'gaw Karen:

=== Consonants ===
S'gaw Karen consonants
		Labial	Dental	Alveolar	Palatal- (alveolar)	Velar	Glottal
Nasal		m		n	ɲ	ŋ	
Plosive/ Affricate	voiceless	p		t	tʃ	k	ʔ
Plosive/ Affricate	aspirated	pʰ		tʰ	tʃʰ	kʰ	
Plosive/ Affricate	voiced	b		d			
Fricative	voiceless		θ	s	ʃ	x	h
Fricative	voiced					ɣ	ɦ
Approximant	central	w		ɹ	j		
Approximant	lateral			l			

- An aspirated fricative [sʰ] may be present among different accents and dialects.
- /θ/ (သ) is pronounced [θ] in most Myanmar varieties and [s] in northern Thailand.

=== Vowels ===
S'gaw Karen vowels
	Front	Central	Back
High	i	ɨ	u
High-mid	e		o
Mid		ə	
Low-mid	ɛ		ɔ
Low		a	

- /ɨ/ varies between central [ɨ] and [ɯ], depending on the dialect.

=== Tones ===
Ken Manson (2009) proposed a Karen tone box to help understand Karenic tonal diversity and classify Karenic languages. It is similar to William Gedney's Tai tone box (see Proto-Tai language#Tones). The tone box contains diagnostic words for use during field elicitation.

Karen tone box (Manson 2009)
	*A	*B	*B′	*C
Proto-aspirated	1 (III) Water [*tʰi] Branch [*pʰaŋ] Flower [*pʰɔ] Chicken [*sʰan] Sleep [*m̥i] Die [*tʰi]	4 (VI) Star [*sʰa] Leaf [*l̥a] Fingernail [*m̥i] Fire [*m̥e] Give [*pʰe] Bitter [*kʰa]	7 (Va) Bone [*kʰri] Child [*pʰo] Right [*tʰwe] Spicy [*hɛ] Take [*pʰi] Pus [*pʰi/mi]	10 (VIII) Sky [*m̥oʔ] Iron [*tʰaʔ] Pig [*tʰɔʔ] Skin/bark [*pʰeʔ] Shoot [v] [*kʰaʔ] Dark [*kʰeʔ/kʰuʔ]
Proto-voiceless	2 (II) Silver [*rɔn] Ginger [*ʔeŋ] Rabbit [*tɛ] Navel [*te] Spear [*pan] White [*pwa]	5 (VIa) Egg [*ti] Cheek [*pu] Liver [*sɨn] Eat [*ʔam] Left [*se] Be at, exist [*ʔɔ]	8 (V) Paddy [*pɨ] Blow/howl [*ʔu] Head [*klo] Hand [*su] Breathe [*sa] Many [*ʔa]	11 (VIIIa) Alcohol [*siʔ] Wing [*teʔ] Heart [*saʔ] Call/shout [*kaʔ] Near [*pɔʔ]
Proto-voiced	3 (I) Nest [*bwe] Tongue [*ble] Person [*bra] Name [*min] Drunk [*mun] Red [*le]	6 (IV) Sun [*mɤ] Stone [*loŋ] Snake [*ru] Arrow [*bla] Old [humans] [*bra] Hot [*go]	6 (IV) Sun [*mɤ] Stone [*loŋ] Snake [*ru] Arrow [*bla] Old [humans] [*bra] Hot [*go]	12 (VII) Monkey [*zoʔ] Eye/face [*meʔ] Brain [*nɔʔ] Intestines [*breʔ] Rib [*rɤʔ] Deep [*jɔʔ]

== Alphabet (Burmese script) ==
The S'gaw Karen alphabet consists of 25 consonants, 9 vowels, 5 tones and 5 medials. The Karen alphabet was derived from the Burmese script as created by the help of the American Baptist missionary Jonathan Wade in the early 1830s. The Karen alphabet was created for the purpose of translating the Bible into the Karen language. S'gaw Karen script is written from left to right and requires no spaces between words, although modern writing usually contains spaces after each clause to enhance readability.

Grouped consonants
က k (k)	ခ kh (kʰ)	ဂ gh (ɣ)	ဃ x (x)	င ng (ŋ)
စ s (s)	ဆ hs (sʰ)		ၡ sh (ʃ)	ည ny (ɲ)
တ t (t)	ထ hṭ (tʰ)	ဒ d (d)		န n (n)
ပ p (p)	ဖ hp (pʰ)	ဘ b (b)		မ m (m)

Miscellaneous consonants
ယ y (ʝ)	ရ r (r)	လ l (l)	ဝ w (w)	သ th (θ)
ဟ h (h)	အ vowel holder (ʔ)	ဧ ahh (ɦ)		

- က has a sound intermediate between k and g; as in g for good
- ခ is the aspirate of က. It is pronounced like kh as heard in the word camp.
- ဂ has no analogue in English or German. See: voiced velar fricative
- ဃ is pronounced like ch in the German bach, or the Scottish loch.
- င is pronounced like ng as heard in sing
- စ has a sound intermediate between s and z.
- ဆ is the aspirate of စ. It has the sound of ssh, as heard in the phrase hiss him.
- ၡ is pronounced like sh as heard in shell
- ည is pronounced like ny as heard in canyon
- တ has a sound intermediate between t and d; say t without air coming out
- ထ is the aspirate of တ. It is pronounced like ht as heard in the word hot
- ဒ is pronounced like d as heard in day
- န is pronounced like n as heard in net
- ပ has a sound intermediate between b and p; say p without air coming out
- ဖ is pronounced like p as heard in pool
- ဘ is pronounced like b in ball
- မ is pronounced like m as heard in mall
- ယ is pronounced like y as heard in backyard
- ရ is pronounced like r as heard in room
- လ is pronounced like l as heard in school
- ဝ is pronounced like w as heard in wonderful
- သ is pronounced like th as heard in thin
- ဟ is pronounced like h as heard in house
- အ as a consonant, has no sound of its own; it is a mere stem to which vowel signs are attached. Vowel carrier
- ဧ is pronounced as a ɦ sound. See: breathy-voiced glottal approximant

=== Vowels ===
Vowels can never stand alone and if a word starts with a vowel syllable, use the vowel carrier "အ" which is silent in order to write words that start with vowel.

Vowels
ါ ah (a)	ံ ee (i)	ၢ uh (ə)	ု u (ɯ)	ူ oo (u)	့ ae or ay (e)	ဲ eh (ɛ)	ိ oh (o)	ီ aw (ɔ)

- အ – a in quota
- အါ – a in bad
- အံ – i in mean
- အၢ – German ö in Göthe
- အု – German ü in Glück and Korean Hangul character "ㅡ"
- အူ – u in rule, oo in moon
- အ့ – a in rate
- အဲ – e in met
- အိ – o in note
- အီ – aw in raw

=== Tones ===
In S'gaw Karen, every syllable consists of a vowel, either alone, or preceded by a single or double consonant. A syllable always ends in a vowel. Every syllable may be pronounced in six different tones, the meaning varying according to the tone in which it is pronounced.

The number of tones and their pronunciation varies depending on the dialect. Below are the pronunciations of the tones in S'gaw Karen according to Gilmore (1898).

Tones	Description
ၢ် (အၢသံ)	is pronounced with a heavy falling inflection
ာ် (အးသံ)	is pronounced abruptly, at a low pitch
း (ဖျၢၣ်ဆံး)	is pronounced abruptly at an ordinary pitch
ၣ် (ဟးသံ)	is pronounced with a falling circumflex inflection
ၤ (က့ၣ်ဖိ)	is pronounced with a prolonged even tone

- Where no tone is marked, the syllable is pronounced with a rising inflection.

=== Double consonants ===
When one consonant follows another with no vowel sound intervening, the second consonant is represented by a symbol, which is joined to the character representing the first consonant.

Medials	S'gaw Karen
ှ hg (ɣ)	ဂ
ၠ y (j)	ယ
ြ r (r~ɹ)	ရ
ျ l (l)	လ
ွ w (w)	ဝ

The examples of writing the Karen alphabet are:

- ခ + ံ → ခံ, pronounced /kʰi/
- လ + ံ + း → လံး, pronounced /li/
- က + ၠ +ိ → ကၠိ, pronounced /kʝo/
- က + ျ +ိ + ၣ် → ကျိၣ်, pronounced /klo/

== Alphabet (Latin script) ==
The Karen Latin alphabet has 24 consonants, 9 vowels and 5 tones. The tones are written with alphabetic letters.

=== Consonants ===
Letter	K k	Hk hk	G g	Q q	Ng ng	C c	Hs hs	Ny ny	T t	Ht ht	D d	N n
IPA	k	kʰ	ɣ	x	ŋ	tʃ	s, sʰ	ɲ	t	tʰ	d	n

Letter	P p	Hp hp	B b	M m	Y y	R r	L l	W w	S s	H h	Ee	
IPA	p	pʰ	b	m	j	ɹ	l	w	s	h, ɦ	ɛ	a

- K matches with the English word guard
- Hk matches with the English word car
- G does not have a sound similar to the European languages but matches with the other Karen alphabet of ဂ
- Q matches with the German word bach
- Ng matches with the English word young
- C matches with the English ch
- Hs has the same sound as S
- Ny matches with the Spanish letter ñ
- T have similar sound with English d but say it without air coming out
- Ht matches with the English word tool
- D have the same sound as English d
- N matches with English N
- P have similar sound to English p but say it without air coming out
- Hp matches with English p
- B matches with English b
- M matches with English m
- Y matches with English y
- R matches with English r
- L matches with English l
- W matches with English w
- S matches with English s; same sound as Hs
- H matches with English h
- EH has no analogue in the European languages
- AH has no analogue in the European languages

=== Vowels ===
Vowels	A a	E e	I i	O o	U u	AI ai	EI ei	AU au	OO oo
IPA	a	ə	i	o	ɨ/ɯ	ɛ	e	ɔ	u

- A matches with the Italian a
- E matches with the English word rust; uh
- I matches with the Italian i
- O matches with the Spanish o
- U matches with the Korean romanization eu
- AI matches with the English word sell
- EI matches with the name Jay
- AU matches with the English word fault
- OO matches with the English word cool

=== Tones ===
Tones	V v	J j	X x	F f	Z z

- av or ă – high mid tone
- aj or à – middle of the sound
- ax or â – low tone; low voice in a short time
- af or ä – high-pitched tone
- az or ā – even tone

== Grammar ==
In terms of linguistic typology, S'gaw Karen is an isolating language with scarce bound morphology and where most syllables can occur as independent words. The word order is subject–verb–object, which differs from other Tibeto-Burman languages, most of which are verb final.

=== Nouns and noun phrases ===
S'gaw Karen nouns are intrinsically neutral as to number, gender, and definiteness. Plural reference is achieved by using the plural marker တဖၣ် /təpʰà/.

Like many East and Southeast Asian languages, S'gaw Karen uses classifiers to count objects expressed by count nouns, and measure words to quantify substances expressed by mass nouns.

ဟံၣ် ခံ ဖျၢၣ်
hì kʰí pʰlə̀
house two CL
"two houses"

သကွံသၣ် တ- ကဒိၣ်
θəkwíθà tə- kədò
banana one CL
"a bunch of bananas"

S'gaw Karen has two demonstratives, အံၤ /ʔi/ 'this' and န့ၣ် /nè/ 'that', which follow the noun or the classifier phrase, if present.

=== Verbs and verb phrases ===
S'gaw Karen distinguishes between intransitive, transitive, and ditransitive verbs. Transitive and ditransitive verbs require one and two objects, respectively, while intransitive verbs do not take objects. As an isolating language, S'gaw Karen lacks case inflection in nouns. The function of a noun is determined by its position in the clause; generally, subjects precede the verb while objects follow it.

S'gaw Karen verbs do not inflect for tense or aspect; instead, these grammatical categories are expressed using separate words.

Perfect aspect is expressed by the particle လံ /lí/, which indicates a change in the situation.

ယဖး လံာ် တဘ့ၣ် အံၤ ဝံၤ လံ.
jə-pʰaˀ liˀ tə-bè ʔī wī lí
I-read book one-CL this finish lí.
"I have finished (reading) this book."

Prospective aspect is indicated by က /kə-/, which precedes the verb. Sentences with က are often translated using the future tense in English.

ယ က ဟး ဃု တၢ်မၤ.
jə- kə- haˀ xɨ́ tamā
I- kə- walk search job
"I will look for a job."

To negate a verb, the verb prefix တ /tə-/ and the final particle ဘၣ် /bà/ are used.

ယ တ သ့ၣ်ညါ ဘၣ်.
jə- tə- θèɲá bà
I- NEG- know NEG
"I don't know."

S'gaw Karen makes extensive use of verb serialization to express various grammatical meanings, such as causativity and benefaction.

Causative events, where a subject causes an object to perform an action or be in a state, are expressed using one of the verbs မၤ /mā/ 'make, cause' or ဒုး /dɨ/ 'let, have (someone do something)' before the main verb. Which verb to use depends on whether or not the causer has direct and full control over the action; if not, and the causee has some control, ဒုး is used (indirect causation), otherwise မၤ is used (direct causation).

အဝဲ မၤ ပျံၤ ယၤ.
ʔəwɛ́ mā plī jā
3SG CAUS be.afraid 1SG.OBJ
"He frightens me."

ဒုး က့ၤ အီၤ.
dɨ kē ʔɔ̄
CAUS return 3SG.OBJ
"Get him to go home./Let him go home."

Benefaction refers to the performance of actions for someone's sake. In S'gaw Karen, benefactive clauses contain the verb န့ၢ် /ne/ 'get', which follows the main verb or verb compound.

သီခါ စိာ် န့ၢ် နၤ နာ် တ ဖျၢၣ်.
θɔkʰá soˀ ne nā naˀ tə- pʰlə
monk carry BEN 2SG.OBJ basket one CL
"The monk carried the basket for you."

=== Pronouns ===
S'gaw Karen personal pronouns are distinguished according to person and number, except for the third person, which sometimes has the same form for the singular and the plural. Additionally, all pronouns are gender-neutral; for example, the third-person pronoun အ /ʔə-/ has the meanings 'he, his', 'she, her', 'it, its', 'they, their'. Below is a table showing the subject/possessive forms (ယ 'I; my', etcetera) and object forms (ယၤ 'me', etcetera) of the pronouns.

S'gaw Karen personal pronouns
Person	Singular		Plural	
Person	Subject/ possessive	Topic/object	Subject/ possessive	Topic/object
First person	ယ (jə-)	ယၤ (jā)	ပ (pə-)	ပှၤ (pɣā)
Second person	န (nə-)	နၤ (nā)	သု (θɨ́)	သု (θɨ́)
Third person	အ* (ʔə-)	အီၤ* (ʔɔ̄)	အ** (ʔə-)	အီၤ** (ʔɔ̄)

* The form အဝဲ /ʔəwɛ́/ is also used.
** The form အဝဲသ့ၣ် /ʔəwɛ́θè/ is also used.

=== Prepositions ===
S'gaw Karen uses prepositions to indicate things such as the location, source, goal, or instrument of an action or situation. The most common S'gaw Karen prepositions are လၢ /lə/ 'at, to, from', ဖဲ /pʰɛ́/ 'at', ဆူ /sʰú/ 'to', ဒ် /di/ 'like, as', and ဒီး /dɔ/ 'with'.

ယ လဲၤ ဆူ ဝ့ၢ်တကူၣ်.
jə- lɛ sʰú wetəkù
1SG go to Yangon
"I go to Yangon/Rangoon."

When the source or goal of an action is a person, the locational word အိၣ် /ʔò/ is used.

ဟဲ ဆူ ယ အိၣ်.
hɛ́ sʰú jə- ʔò
come to 1SG ʔò
"Come to me."
